= Holly Solomon Gallery =

Art gallery in New York City

Coordinates: 40.724138°N 74.002463°W

Holly Solomon Gallery opened in New York City in 1975 at 392 West Broadway in Soho, Manhattan. Started by Holly Solomon - aspiring actress, style-icon, and collector - and her husband Horace Solomon, the gallery was initially known for launching major art careers and nurturing the artistic movement known as Pattern and Decoration, which was a reaction to the austerities of Minimal art.

In 1969, Solomon opened the 98 Greene St. Loft. The south of Houston noncommercial exhibition space, rented for $158 per month, hosted poetry readings, performances, musical events and exhibitions by artists and writers such as Ted Barrigan, Laurie Anderson, Gordon Matta-Clark, Donna Dennis, Robert Kushner, George Schneeman, and others. The Loft operated for three years.

The Holly Solomon Gallery represented artists such as Judy Pfaff, Joan Mitchell, Cora Cohen, Gordon Matta-Clark, Laurie Anderson, Robert Kushner, Melissa Miller, Rob Wynne, Nam June Paik, and William Wegman. In 1983, the gallery moved uptown to 724 Fifth Ave at 57th, but then moved again in the early 1990s back downtown to SoHo at 172 Mercer Street following Holly's divorce from Horace. Solomon was also a proponent of the Pattern and Decoration art movement of the late 1970s and early 1980s and related tendencies that broke with the more austere aspects of Post-Minimalism and Conceptual Art. Many of the artists featured in her gallery were involved in what is also known as the P and D movement, including Miriam Schapiro, Izhar Patkin, Valerie Jaudon, Thomas Lanigan-Schmidt, Kim MacConnel and Ned Smyth.

After the Mercer Street gallery closed in 1999 due to a dispute with the building's landlord, Holly Solomon continued to deal in art from the Chelsea Hotel until her death in 2002.

In 2014, the Gallery was celebrated in an exhibition titled Hooray for Hollywood!, co-curated by Mixed Greens’ Heather Bhandari and Steven Sergiovanni (a former director of Holly Solomon Gallery), and Pavel Zoubok, whose program of contemporary collage and mixed-media was influenced by Solomon’s example.
