= Chris Tanner =

American artist and performer

Christopher Tanner (born December 1955) is an American contemporary artist and performer.

== Early life ==
Chris Tanner was born in a car near Pasadena, California, and grew up in Duarte. His father was a shoemaker and a clerk at the race track. His mother, Sally Tanner, was a commercial artist who was elected to the California State Assembly and authored the Lemon Law.

By age 10, Chris Tanner was taking art lessons from Argie Taylor, a trained artist and mother of one of his school friends who had died. Together they shared their grief through art and became great companions visiting museums and galleries. He credits her as the main influence on his work.

Tanner went to CalArts in San Francisco and majored in neon sculpture. Alongside his studies, he acted at Disney World. He graduated in 1979 and moved to New York.

== Career ==
Soon after arriving in New York, the artist became a part of the East Village art scene, which was beginning to boom with art galleries and studios. It became a community which incorporated painters, sculptors, photographers, musicians, poets, dancers, video and performance artists.

Coming to art from the off-Broadway scene, Tanner is an abstractionist whose work has been described as "ebullient, dizzy, and sumptuous" (Art and Antiques, 6/99). In 1985, he took a trip to Taiwan, where he saw all sorts of garishness. This experience became the major underlying inspiration of his style of art expression. He started making lavish gilded frames for his paintings, which became works of art in themselves.

Since the 1980s, the artist's work, known for its jewel encrusted assemblages and freestanding driftwood sculptures, has contained familiar parts that make his work recognizable. The difference between real and unreal, between decoration and art has been deleted in advance, to imply a culture that is glamorous, and transformative. Tanner's work pushes decoration to the foreground, and then into abstractions. His approach is in some way allied with the mid 70's Pattern and Decoration movement (P&D), that brought forth artists such as Miriam Schapiro, Valerie Jaudon, Joyce Kozloff and Robert Kushner; all artists who realized that most of the world's artistic production has grown out of the impulse to adornment. Robert Kushner, active in the pattern-painting movement, took an interest in Tanner's work, especially the experiments with unusual mediums such as large sequins and glitter. He also had a method of encasing his entire canvases in shiny clear epoxy.

Tanner is widely collected, especially by designers and architects who appreciate the strong statements of his work. Pavel Zoubok, Paul Bridgewater and Liebman Magnan Gallery have represented him in New York, and he has shown at LaMama Galleria in New York, USA, Galerie Oz in Paris, France and Flatland Gallery in Utrecht, Holland, to name but a few.

== Performance ==
Tanner has created his own company, the Frances Ethel Gumm Memorial Players, who have performed throughout the United States in theatres and in conjunction with his exhibitions. Tanner performed at La MaMa since 1979. His first show there was Night Club, directed by John Vacarro. Since then, he presented productions such as Ravaged by Romance, Up, Up and more Up, Jack of Tarts, One must do what one Must do, and Etiquette of Death. His most recent production Football Head showcased at La Mama, New York in June 2014 as well as at Pangea and Dixon Place.
