= Alfredo Arreguín =

Mexican-American painter (1935–2023)

Bitterns (1980), Smithsonian American Art Museum, on loan from the Whatcom Museum

Alfredo Arreguín (January 20, 1935 – April 24, 2023) was a Mexican-American painter, known for pattern-based paintings focused on animals, plants, and the natural world, as well as featuring Mexican cultural heritage.

For sixty years, he worked out of his adopted home of Seattle, Washington, producing his signature style of pattern paintings that sourced his Mexican culture and his experience in the Pacific Northwest. He was known as a leader in the Latin American art scene.

== Early life ==
Arreguín was born in Morelia, Michoacán, Mexico. He studied painting from the age of 9 and pursued architecture as a young student at Mexico City's prominent Escuela Nacional Preparatoria, where Frida Kahlo studied several decades earlier. Kahlo remained a lifelong muse for Arreguín, who painted her likeness into his work more than 100 times over the years.

Born to unwed parents, he was raised by his maternal grandparents, Carlos Mendoza Alvarez and Josefa Martínez. His grandfather started him on artistic pursuits by providing painting materials and pencils. He also took Arreguín along for a business trip into a small village, Las Canoas, that was filled with plants, trees, insects, and birds. These sights captured Arreguín's eye and imagination. While his grandfather encouraged his artistic pursuits, Arreguín claims his skills came from his mother, María Mendoza Martínez.

In December 1948, his grandparents died within three days of one another. Their deaths forced Arreguín to move back with his mother and step-father. He did not get along with his step-father, Jesus Robles, and soon moved in with his maternal aunt in Mexico City. He first met his biological father, Felix Arreguin Velez, in Mexico City when he was fourteen.

== Immigration and education in the United States ==
In 1955, Arreguín met a family from Seattle that were travelling through Mexico. After guiding the family to their tourist destination, the couple invited Arreguín to visit them in the US. After visiting in 1956, they offered to host him further, and encouraged him to apply to college in Seattle. Obtaining a visa, he immigrated to the United States intended to enroll at the University of Washington. He was admitted in 1958 but was also drafted by the United States Army.

After immigrating to the U.S. at 24 years old, Arreguín was drafted to serve in the Korean War. He returned to Seattle and earned bachelor's and master's degrees in painting from the University of Washington, where he was part of a 1960s generation of artists on the campus that included painters Chuck Close and Roger Shimomura and glass artist Dale Chihuly. It was at the University of Washington that Arreguín met the poet and writer Tess Gallagher. Gallagher's husband, the author Raymond Carver, would later describe Arreguín as a painter who worked "like a locomotive," a reference to the long days he spent painting.

== Honors and recognition ==
Arreguín's work has received wide recognition. As a representative for the United States, Arreguín won the 1979 "Palm of the People Award" at the International Festival of Painting in France. The following year, he received a National Endowment for the Arts Visual Arts fellowship. His success led him to serve on the Seattle Arts Commission from 1980-1982. In 1986, he was the recipient of the Governor’s Art Award from the state of Washington." In 1988, he was asked to design the official White House Easter egg.

Arreguín painted Mi Amigo Ray, as tribute to his friend and poet Raymond Carver. That image appeared as the cover art for Carver's final published book of poetry, A New Path to the Waterfall. Carver's wife, poet Tess Gallagher, wrote the foreword for professor Lauro Flores' book on Arreguín.

In 1992, Arreguín designed the poster marking the 20th anniversary of Seattle's El Centro de la Raza, a cultural center created by student and community activism in 1972. One of El Centro's founders, Roberto Maestas, described Arreguín's impact on regional art, saying “because of his political statements and his artistic talent, Alfredo has helped put Washington on the map. He has paved the way for appreciation for other Chicano artists. He is the dean of Latino art in the entire Northwest.”

Arreguín's work has been described as neo-Ornamentalism, Pattern Painting, or as a Pattern and Decoration style. His paintings have been compared to other artists such as Joyce Kozloff, Robert Kushner, Kim MacConnell, Miriam Schapiro. While at the University of Washington, he studied under Alden Mason. His techniques were also strongly guided by feedback given to him by Elmer Bischoff.

In 1995, the federal government of Mexico awarded him the Ohtli Award awarded to those "who have distinguished themselves for their work for many years for the benefit of the community of Mexican origin abroad, in any field of human endeavor." His work was described by the award as an example of a "prominent Mexican artist whose pictorial works have been widely recognized as expressions of the culture of Mexico." His style relied on small brush strokes that built up to cover large canvases, which meant that an individual painting could take weeks or months.

Arreguin's work is held in the permanent collection of museums around the world, including the Smithsonian American Art Museum, the National Portrait Gallery (United States) and the National Academy of Sciences. His influence on Latin American art has led to his work being acquired by the National Museum of Mexican Art in Chicago, The Mexican Museum in San Francisco and the National Hispanic Cultural Center in Albuquerque. The U.S. State Department holds his work in embassies in Ciudad Juárez, Mexico and Karachi, Pakistan.

Arreguín had his first solo show in 1977, at The Mexican Museum. He went on to have more than 40 solo exhibitions, including a number of retrospectives. His most recent retrospective was the 2022 show "Arreguín: Painter from the New World" at the Museum of Northwest Art.

Arreguín was commissioned by the Washington State Supreme Court to paint a portrait of Chief Justice Steven González. He painted the portrait of Charles Z. Smith (in 2014), the court's first African American justice. The Seattle Law School commissioned Arreguín for the portrait of Mary Yu, who was the first openly gay justice. She was also the first Latina and Chinese American justice for the state court. These portraits now hang in the state's Temple of Justice.

One of Arreguín's paintings ("Las Garzas") hangs in the office of University of Washington president Ana Mari Cauce. “Las Garzas” depicts herons flying across a starry mosaic sky and wading through seemingly bioluminescent water. Cauce noted that “Alfredo Arreguín filled the world with beauty,” and that “he made my spirit soar like the breaching orcas in his paintings.”

== Other facts ==
He is currently represented by Rob Schouten Gallery in Langley, Washington. website: https://www.robschoutengallery.com/alfredo-arreguin

He was represented by Linda Hodges Gallery in Seattle, Washington.

In 1984, Arreguín became a naturalized US citizen.

He shared his basement studio with the painter Susan R. Lytle, to whom he was married for 49 years.

His home and studio in Seattle are listed on the National Register of Historic Places.

His portrait of Frida Kahlo is sold as a 1000-piece puzzle by Pomegranate.

== Collections ==
- National Portrait Gallery, Washington DC
- Seattle Art Museum
- Smithsonian American Art Museum - see Sueno (Dream: Eve Before Adam) and Encantación, from the National Chicano Screenprint Taller, 1988-1989.
