= Amy Goldin =

American art critic (1926–1978)

Amy Goldin (February 20, 1926 – April 2, 1978) was an American art critic who worked from 1965 until 1978. In those thirteen years, she published almost 200 pieces, from single paragraph reviews of current exhibitions, catalog essays, and book reviews. She covered topics that were unconventional at the time: Folk art, African-American art, craft, decoration, graffiti and Islamic art. Her writing appeared regularly in Arts, ARTnews, Artforum, Art Journal, New American Review, International Journal for Aesthetics and Art Criticism, and most frequently in Art in America, where she was a contributing editor.

== Early life and education ==
Amy Genevieve Mendelson was born in Detroit on February 20, 1926. Her parents, Harry and Jeanette Mendelson, immigrated from Russia shortly before her birth. Following studies at Wayne State University, Detroit, (1943–45) and the University of Chicago (1945–47), Amy moved to New York City in 1948 and set up a painting studio on East 56th Street. She became a student at the Art Students' League in 1948–49, attended Black Mountain College near Asheville, North Carolina in the Summer and then studied with Hans Hofmann in New York from 1950 to 1952.

== Painting career ==
After studying philosophy at the University of Chicago, Goldin devoted herself to a career as a painter. One of the few dated examples of her work was a 1960 cover and series of drawings for Trobar, an independent poetry journal. During the early 1960s, her painting style evolved from expressionism to geometric, hard-edge abstraction. Matisse was a strong influence. In a review of a post-humous exhibition of her paintings in 1978, Peter Frank commented: "Goldin's spunky little Hard Edge works are her most original, but she was a skilled and-not surprisingly-highly intelligent painter before that." In 1965, an exhibition of her hard edge paintings was mounted at Brata Gallery, an artists' cooperative gallery located on 10th Street. This exhibition received a cursory review in Arts Magazine in the very same issue that Goldin first started publishing her reviews of other artists' exhibitions. After 1965, Goldin continued making work, but she was never satisfied with her studio practice. Hereafter she focused her energies-and became known for-her reviews and critical essays.

== Criticism and legacy ==
As she began writing criticism in 1965, her friendships in particular with the Deep Image group of poets, particularly Robert Kelly, Jerome Rothenberg, David Antin and George Economou, provided a sophisticated playing field and a ready audience for her early criticism. Many facets of her existing interests aligned: her fascination with historical and contemporary art, her study of philosophy and sociology, her argumentative nature, her empathy with paint and painters. Over the next year she completed more than 100 short reviews for Arts Magazine. Longer, thought provoking pieces soon became her forte. She loved to chew on an idea, particularly one that had not received much attention, read what others might have written, refute their positions, and then assert her own. She is known for her original, unorthodox criticism; her early career as a painter gave her a unique viewpoint that was strongly sympathetic to artists rather than the critical establishment. After writing about George Sugarman's work, they became devoted friends, correspondents and intellectual sparring partners. Of his work, Goldin wrote: "Sugarman believes that if a piece of sculpture feels like a thing, even a beautiful thing, it's a failure. He wants a more energetic relationship between the work and the space it creates, for the sake of vivid response. Consequently, he believes that the relationship between one part of the work and another should not seem overtly inevitable and logical, but open and full of possibilities."

In 1972, Goldin received a National Endowment Critic's Grant. She commuted to Harvard to take courses from noted Islamicist, Oleg Grabar. Here she found an intellectual basis and a world of information on an art form for which the term decoration is in no way a pejorative. Tunisian artist and writer Emna Zghal notes that Goldin was unusually forward-thinking in her treatment of Islamic art. According to Zghal, Goldin largely avoided the Orientalism common to her contemporary art critics and historians.

Los Angeles Times critic Christopher Knight describes Goldin's 1974 essay "The Esthetic Ghetto: Some Thoughts about Public Art" as "the single best consideration of its thorny subject that I have read." According to this essay, a piece would typically be considered "public art" if-because of its size and location-it reaches a large audience and it addresses a matter of social importance. Goldin, however, defines a third qualification: that the art demands a moral response from the public, thus rendering them participants in a public discourse. She claims that public art is today an impossibility because "in public parks and buildings, anything that clearly proclaims its Art-nature is identified with Management." Today's society is too cynical, too suspicious of power to be engaged by work that is presented in the context of public art.

She is also recognized for first providing a theoretical framework for the Pattern and Decoration Movement, which was largely dismissed by contemporary critics. In the 1975 essay "Patterns, Grids, and Painting" she describes the function and value of pattern. She writes, "the enjoyment of patterns and grids, so often linked to religion, magic, and states of being not-quite-here, requires an indifference to self-assertion uncongenial to most Westerners." She similarly affirms decoration in her 1975 exploration of Matisse's late cut-outs, asserting that they are the culmination of his life's work: "Matisse leaves your mind alone. The experience he provides is sensuous and emotional, and intelligence impinges only when you resolutely invoke it to discover the causes of such order and delight. The experience of decoration is typically celebrant and content-less." In their widely anthologized 1978 essay "Art Hysterical Notions of Progress and Culture," Pattern and Decoration artists Joyce Kozloff and Valerie Jaudon explained how they thought sexist and racist assumptions underlaid Western art history discourse. They reasserted the value of ornamentation and aesthetic beauty - qualities assigned to the feminine sphere. The end of this essay states, "To Amy Goldin whose ideas and encouragement made this piece possible."

She was the 1977 winner of the College Art Association's Frank Jewett Mather Award for art criticism. Other winners from that period include Rosalind Krauss, Lucy R. Lippard, and Linda Nochlin.

== Death and legacy ==
She died of cancer on April 2, 1978, after choosing not to pursue an aggressive treatment.

In 2011, a collection of her writings was published as "Amy Goldin: Art in a Hairshirt" edited by her friend and former student Robert Kushner.
