= Ed Friedman =

American poet and playwright (born 1950)

Ed Friedman (born January 12, 1950) is an American poet and playwright.

Friedman was born in Los Angeles, California, and studied literature at the University of California at San Diego. He moved to New York City in 1971 and soon after enrolled in one of Bernadette Mayer's workshops at the Poetry Project at St. Mark's Church-in-the-Bowery. From this came the magazine Unnatural Acts, with collaborative contents presented anonymously, which Mayer and Friedman put out from 1972 to 1973.

Friedman then "invented performance poetry" when he began to oversee the Project's Monday night readings series during the period 1974 to 1976. He became the Artistic Director of the Poetry Project in 1987 and served in that capacity until 2003, the longest term of any AD for the Project.

Friedman has given readings and performances at the Museum of Modern Art, The Kitchen, and The Public Theater, among other venues. He has collaborated with visual artist Robert Kushner – whose hat designs worn by models descending a spiral staircase were accompanied by Friedman's poetry, published in The New York Hat Line (1979), and who designed the settings for Friedman's 1982 play The White Snake – and Kim MacConnel – on several projects about learning a new language (Lingomats, 1980) and an illustrated phrasebook (La Frontera, 1983). – He also collaborated with composer Peter Gordon on the play with music Chinoiserie, presented at The Kitchen in 1978.

Two of Friedman's projects from 1979 are significant to his work. The Telephone Book consists of transcripts of Friedman's phone calls throughout a number of weeks, and Space Stations – which has not been published in its entirety, follows up on William S. Burroughs by dividing a journal's pages into three columns and recording Firedman's attention shifts while he is writing. Space Stations provided the material for much of Friedman's published poetry from 1982 to 2001.

Jerome Rothenberg has said of Friedman that he is "a powerful & never disappointing poet/chronicler, at the top of his form & ready to take his place among the makers & movers of our time," and Ed Sanders has said, "You can count on Ed Friedman ... to take you on a fine ride."

== Works ==
- The New Space (1973) Unnatural Acts Press. ISBN 0916382206;
  - repub. (1979) New York: Bozeaux of London Press
  - repub. (1992) Guilford Press. ISBN 0898621453
- The Black Star Pilgrimage (1977) New York: Frontward Books. ISBN 0916382206
- Chinoiserie (play, music by Peter Gordon, 1977)
- The New York Hat Line (with Robert Kushner and Katherine Landman, 1979) New York: Bozeaux of London Press.
- The Telephone Book (1979) Power Mad Press/Telephone Books. ISBN 0916382206
- Lingomats (with Kim MacConnel, 1980)
- The White Snake (play, 1982)
- La Frontera (with Kim MacConnel, 1983) Helpful Books.
- Humans Work: Poems 1982–86 (1988) Helpful Books
- Mao & Matisse (1995) Brooklyn, New York: Hanging Loose Press. ISBN 1882413202
- The World: 54 (1998) Poetry Project
- The World: 56 57 (2000) Poetry Project
- Away (with Robert Kushner, 2001)
- The World: 58 (2002) Poetry Project
- Space Stations: The Funeral Journal (2001) Jensen/Daniels. ISBN 1893032264
- Drive Through the Blue Cylinders (2001) Brooklyn, New York: Hanging Loose Press. ISBN 1882413962
- Two Towns (2015) Brooklyn, New York: Hanging Loose Press. ISBN 978-1934909-94-2
