= Holly Solomon =

American actress

Coordinates: 40.72427°N 74.00265°W

Holly Solomon (1934–2002) was an American collector of contemporary art and founder of the Holly Solomon Gallery in New York City in 1975. Her SoHo, Manhattan gallery was initially known for nurturing the artistic movement known as Pattern and Decoration, which was a reaction to the austerities of Minimal art. She was the subject of an early portrait by Andy Warhol that made her a Pop Art icon, of sorts, as well as the subject of portraits by Roy Lichtenstein and Robert Rauschenberg. Holly and Horace Solomon made a lasting contribution to the work of Gordon Matta-Clark when they provided the site for Matta-Clark's project Splitting, a suburban home in Englewood, New Jersey.

== History ==
Solomon was born Hollis Dworken in Bridgeport, Connecticut, United States, in 1934. Her father was an immigrant from Russia who operated a local grocery and liquor store. She initially enrolled at Vassar College but transferred to Sarah Lawrence College where she graduated in 1955. In 1953 she married Horace Solomon, who became her partner in The Holly Solomon Gallery. In 1989, Solomon established the Arts Video News Service, a subscription-based monthly video service that featured critical art reviews, interviews, and up-to-date information on work featured in galleries and museums primarily in the New York area.

Holly Solomon had been an aspiring stage actress and was enrolled at Lee Strasberg's Actors Studio shortly after moving to Manhattan. She and her husband began collecting Pop Art and in 1969 the couple opened an alternative work and performance art space for artists named 98 Greene Street Loft. The space provided a venue for poets, actors, and artists to work and perform.

Solomon wrote and produced a five-part documentary film from the performances given at 98 Greene Street, and in 1972 it was shown at the Edinburgh International Film Festival. 98 Greene Street Loft closed in 1973.

The gallery represented artists such as Judy Pfaff, Joan Mitchell, Cora Cohen, Gordon Matta-Clark, Laurie Anderson, Robert Kushner, Melissa Miller, Rob Wynne, Nam June Paik, and William Wegman, and in 1983, the gallery moved uptown to 724 Fifth Ave at 57th, but then moved again in the early 1990s back downtown to SoHo at 172 Mercer Street. Solomon was also a proponent of the Pattern and Decoration art movement of the late 1970s and early 1980s and related tendencies that broke with the more austere aspects of Post-Minimalism and Conceptualism. Many of the artists featured in her gallery were involved in the P and D movement including Miriam Schapiro, Izhar Patkin, Valerie Jaudon, Thomas Lanigan-Schmidt, Kim MacConnel and Ned Smyth.

After the gallery closed, Holly Solomon continued to deal in art from the Chelsea Hotel until her death in 2002.
