= Jennifer Cecere =

American artist

Jennifer Cecere (born 1950, Richmond, Indiana) is an American artist primarily known for her role as an early member of the Pattern and Decoration art movement in New York City during the mid-1970s and early 1980s.

== Early life ==
Jennifer Cecere was born to second-generation Italian-American parents in 1950. After growing up in Richmond, Indiana, Cecere moved to Andover, Massachusetts, at the age of 14 to attend Abbot Academy, later Phillips Academy, Andover. After graduating from the Academy in 1969, she attended Cornell University to study painting, earning her B.F.A in 1973.

== Career ==
She created the first of her many large-scale installation projects, In My Room, at MoMA PS1 in 1979. In My Room, which saw Cecere transform the entirety of one of the building's former classrooms into a living room resplendent with tables, floor tiles, curtains, sofa It was a pivotal moment in the artist's career. She would go on to become a long-standing member of the Pattern and Decoration movement with exhibitions and installation projects at MoMA, The Guggenheim Museum, Pratt Institute, Socrates Sculpture Park, Cooper Hewitt, Smithsonian Design Museum, The Addison Gallery of American Art, The Hudson River Museum, The Herbert F. Johnson Museum of Art, and The Burchfield Penney Art Center.

== Public art ==
Since creating her first public commission in 2009 at Socrates Sculpture Park in Long Island City, Queens, Cecere has developed site-specific sculptures for numerous institutions. These installations have included projects for The Staten Island Ferry Terminal, The New York City Department of Transportation, and Newport Beach's Civic Center Park

In 2014, Cecere was selected as the winner of a national competition to design a permanent sculpture for the brand new Greater Cleveland Regional Transit Authority light rail station in Cleveland, Ohio. Her sculpture, Chandelier, was permanently installed in the station in 2015.

== Later career ==
In 2019, when Pattern and Decoration saw a resurgence of scholarly attention, Cecere was one of the artists selected for the multi-country retrospective exhibition on the movement. Pattern, Crime & Decoration, which traveled to Le Consortium in Dijon, France, and to MAMCO in Geneva, Switzerland, featured several of Cecere's 1980 works including her Cat Throne and Chandelier.

Cecere is currently on the Board of Directors for Studio in a School.
