= Liz Whitney Quisgard =

- Born: Elizabeth Whitney; October 23, 1929; Philadelphia, Pennsylvania, U.S.
- Died: April 21, 2024 (aged 94)
- Known for: Painting, fiber art, collage, mixed media
- Movement: Pattern and Decoration

Elizabeth "Liz" Whitney Quisgard (October 23, 1929 – April 21, 2024) was an American visual artist known for her vibrant, ornamental paintings, textile art, and fiber-based installations. Her work was characterized by the use of rich color, precise intricate patterns, inspired by architectural elements and sculptures embellished with complex geometric patterns and a rejection of traditional narrative or symbolic interpretation. She was associated with the Pattern and Decoration movement and exhibited widely across the United States for more than six decades.

== Early life and education ==
Liz Whitney Quisgard was born on October 23, 1929, in Philadelphia, Pennsylvania. She studied at the Maryland Institute College of Art and earned her Master of Fine Arts degree from its Rinehart School of Sculpture.

== Career ==
Quisgard began her professional career in the 1950s and became recognized for a body of work that combined visual intensity with structural repetition. She worked across a variety of media, including acrylic painting, fiber, yarn, sculpture, and collage. Her late works include wall hangings made of yarn on buckram, abstract acrylic paintings resembling mosaics or tapestries, and brightly colored, patterned columns.

She often described her work as "visual, not intellectual", resisting efforts to imbue it with philosophical or political significance. She explained: "My goal is to surprise and engage the mind by seducing the eye. Toward that end I rely on pattern."

=== Exhibitions ===
Quisgard exhibited in over 45 solo and group shows in museums and galleries across the United States. Notable exhibitions include:

- *Dazzle, Pattern, Color, Bling: The Alluring Patterns of Liz Quisgard*, Fort Wayne Museum of Art (2021–2022).
- *Imaginary Architecture*, Martin Art Gallery, Muhlenberg College (2019).
- *Fiber Works*, New Arts Program, Kutztown, Pennsylvania (2020).
- *Kaleidoscope: A Vivid Selection of Paintings*, Berkshire Museum (2012).
- *Embellish*, Bradbury Art Museum, (2016)

Her work is in the collections of the Baltimore Museum of Art, the Chicago Art Institute, the Corcoran Gallery (Washington, D.C.), Fort Wayne Museum of Art, Kingsborough Art Museum, the Kemper Museum of Art, and the Bradbury Art Museum, among others.

=== Awards and residencies ===
Quisgard received a grant from the Pollock-Krasner Foundation in 2001. She was an artist-in-residence at the Yaddo and Millay colonies and received commissions from multiple arts institutions and private collectors.

== Style and influence ==
Quisgard's visual language drew on diverse sources, including Byzantine mosaics, Moorish architecture, Oriental carpets, and Navajo textiles. She often referred to her use of repeated shapes and small units as "pseudo-pointillism."

She was part of the larger Pattern and Decoration movement, which challenged the hierarchy that traditionally placed minimalist and conceptual art above ornamental or decorative aesthetics.

Her work is recognized for its bold embrace of ornament and color, and for challenging mid-century modernist values that dismissed the decorative as trivial or feminine. She was a vocal proponent of art that is "simply beautiful", aiming to seduce the viewer through aesthetics alone.

== Selected collections ==
- Baltimore Museum of Art
- Art Institute of Chicago
- Corcoran Gallery of Art, Washington, D.C.
- Fort Wayne Museum of Art
- Museum of Geometric and MADI Art, Dallas
