= Jean Lowe =

American painter and sculptor

Jean Lowe is a California-based painter and sculptor. She creates installations and sculptural works of enamel-painted papier-mâché.

== Education and career ==
Lowe earned a B.A. from UC Berkeley in 1983. She earned her MFA from UC San Diego in 1988.

She was a lecturer at UC San Diego from 1992 to 2008.

== Works ==
=== Installations ===
Lowe's installations are handmade, labor-intensive and visually playful installations with papier-mâché furnishings and objects juxtaposed to site specific wall painting. Lowe says of her installations, "Intellectually I am driven by an interest in challenging a status quo anthropocentric world view and formally interested in marrying that content to a 'domestic' decorative esthetic."

Many of Lowe's installations have quoted 18th and 19th century French decoration, rife with romanticized images of animals and nature and imbued with a sense of class and privilege. Into this fabric she substitutes or integrate corresponding contemporary attitudes—both about our treatment of the land and its other inhabitants and our attitudes regarding decoration: the wrestling match between high and low art.

Jean Lowe, Accomplishments of Man, The California Center for the Arts, Escondido, CA, 1995.

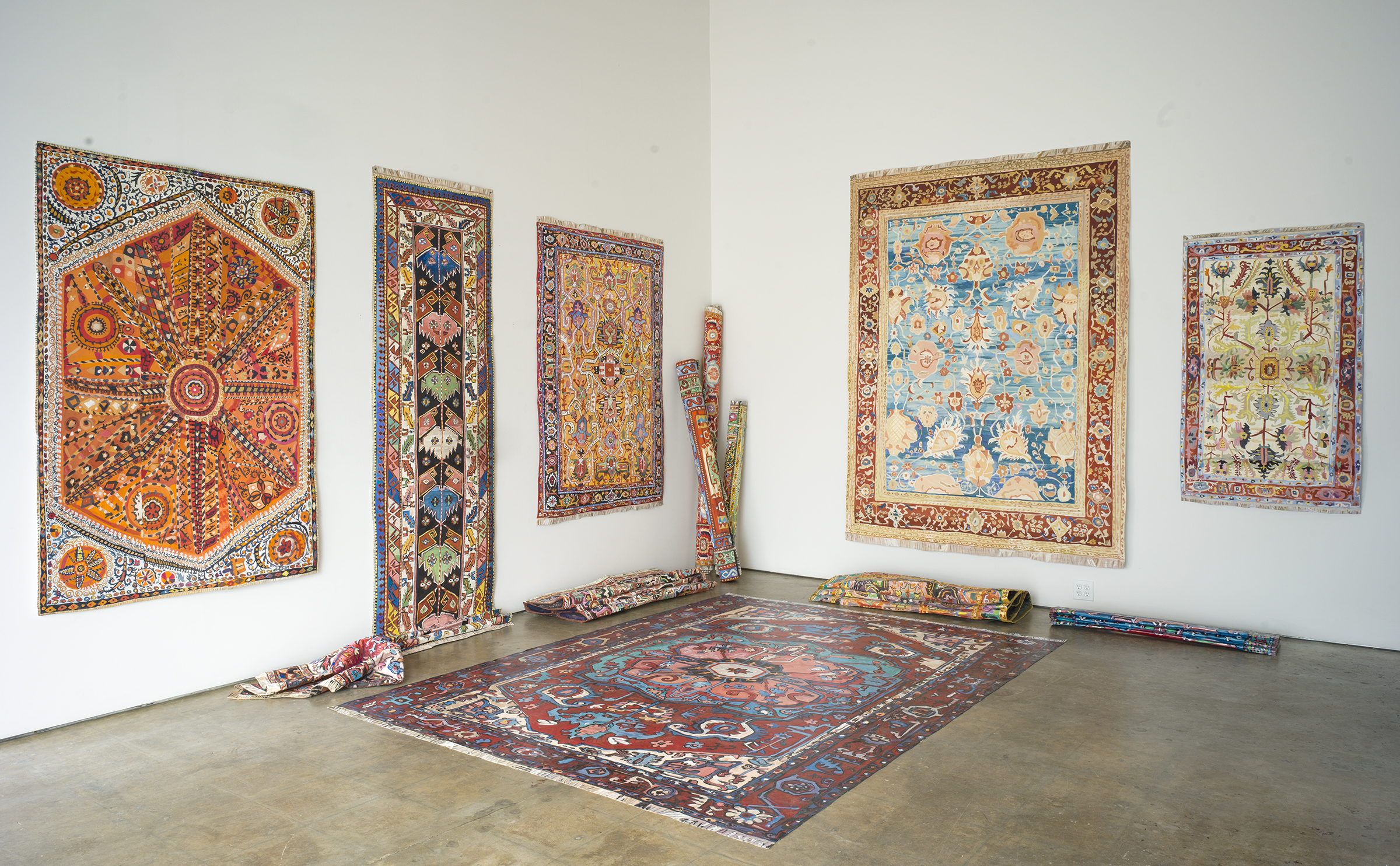
Jean Lowe, Carpet Showroom, Quint Gallery, 2019.

Jean Lowe, Carpet Showroom | Quint Gallery, 2019

=== Books ===
Lowe creates sculptural representations of everyday objects using papier-mâché and enamel paint. She is known for her papier-mâché books and has created a large collection of them with evocative and amusing titles. Her work Books and Ideas in an Age of Anxiety comprises a collection of them in display cases and is situated in Byers Hall at UCSF as part of the J. Michael Bishop Art Collection at Mission Bay.

Among the book titles are:

- Accelerated Zen Buddhism: How to Win at the Hereafter
- Achieve and Maintain a More Powerful Delusion
- Anxiety: The Unexploited Weight Loss Tool
- Artistic Mammography
- Back to Nature: The Notes of Marie Antoinette
- Biblical Family Values
- Cachet: What It Is & How to Get It
- Close But Not Close Enough: The Case for Primate Experimentation
- Craft Your Way to Mental Health
- The Death of Painting
- The Eco-Tourist's Guide to Las Vegas
- Foreclosure Etiquette
- Freedom from Rigor & Competence
- Great Biceps: In 20 to Life
- Great Golf Courses of the World
- A Guide to Box Wines
- Help Me Make Up My Mind, Lord
- The High Fiber Diet
- A History of Genital Warts
- Hormones and Behavior
- Hot Buttered Cop Porn
- How to Dominate Women
- If God Loves Me, Why Am I Living in My Van?
- If God Loves Me, Why Do I Need a Vibrator?
- The Jesus Workout
- Jet-Skiing Mother Ganges
- The Joy of Pickling
- Just Ask God: Washboard Abs for Life
- Kindle: The Missing Manual
- Leadership and You
- Liposuction of the Jowls
- Militant Feminist Veganism for All
- Narcissism and You
- Nutritainment
- Perfect Poultry: Best Recipes from the Audubon Silver Circle Club
- Premature Articulation
- A Quotidian Guide to the Basics
- Rekindling your Passion for What Might Have Been
- Rethinking the Koran
- Something Awesome Is Coming Your Way
- String Theory
- Torture Preparedness
- Tough Love and your Elderly Parents
- The Triumph of Minimalism
- Yosemite: Observations from Behind the Wheel
- The Way Things Work: Build Your Own Guillotine
- What Would Satan Eat?
- When to Tell Your Husband He's Adopted
- Who's Who in American Pre-Schools
- Who's Who in American Prisons
- Who's Who in the Multiverse
- Yes, Yes, Yes!
- Yoga and Stress Reduction
- Your Soul: Fixer Upper or Teardown?

=== Exhibitions ===
Lowe has exhibited in both New York and Los Angeles. She participated in the 1994 exhibition Bad Girls West. In 1995 she collaborated on the installation Bull Story with artist Kim MacConnel.

Lowe's 2012 exhibition Hey Sexy! blended foregrounds depicting imagery from consumer culture with baroque decor backgrounds of the 17th, 18th, and 19th centuries. The exhibition incorporated sculptural objects such as tissue boxes, cases of beer, and a store where sculptural recreations of commodities are sold.

Lowe's work frequently employs satire. In a review of her 2014 exhibition at Rosamund Felsen Gallery, Leah Ollman of the Los Angeles Times wrote that she "stabs satirically at broad-scale practices of deception, as well as personal patterns of self-deception."

Lowe's works are included in the collections of the San Diego Museum of Art, The New Children's Museum, and the Museum of Contemporary Art San Diego.

== Awards and honors ==
Lowe has twice received fellowships from the Western States Arts Federation/NEA and has received a grant from the Pollock-Krasner Foundation. She was also awarded the CalArts Alpert/Ucross Residency Prize. She won the Alberta duPont Bonsal Foundation Art Prize in 2000. She was also the recipient of the 2006/2007 San Diego Art Prize.

== Personal life ==
Lowe lives in Encinitas and is married to artist Kim MacConnel.
