= Kendall Shaw =

American painter (1924–2019)

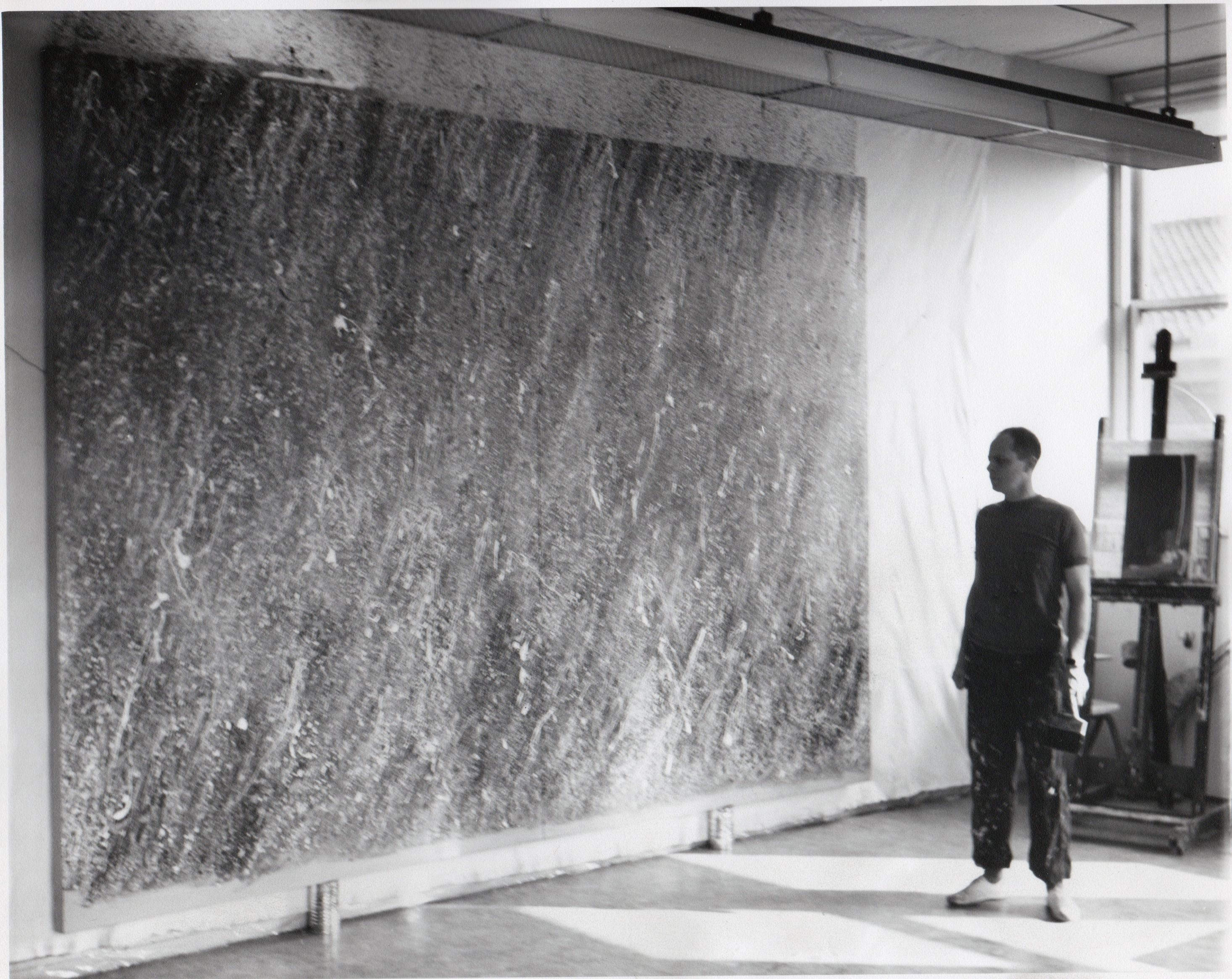
Kendall Shaw, in his studio constructed for him by Dean Charles R. Colbert, with used house painting brush in front of his painting, RED WALL in Avery Hall at Columbia University, Teacher at School of Architecture 1962

George Kendall Shaw (March 30, 1924 – October 18, 2019) was an American painter who was based in New Orleans, with a career spanning a number of art styles—ranging from abstract expressionism to pop art to minimalism to pattern and design to color field—with heightened emotion, pattern, shape, and vivid color predominant. Shaw's work includes a series of 30 paintings based on the Torah of the Old Testament, as well as recent work with pure colors that he terms “Cajun Minimalism.”

== Life and career ==
Shaw was born in New Orleans and attended high school there. In 1943, he enlisted in the United States Navy, where he was a radioman on an SPB Dauntless dive-bomber while searching for German submarines off the mid-Atlantic coast. After the war, he attended the Georgia Institute of Technology and Tulane University, graduating from Tulane in 1949 with a B.S. in Chemistry. From 1950–1951, he took courses in art as well as organic chemistry at Louisiana State University, studying with visiting painter O. Louis Guglielmi. In 1951, Shaw moved to the New York City area as a chemical researcher for Stauffer Chemical. In New York, he continued his relationship with Guglielmi at The New School, also studying there with Stuart Davis and at the Brooklyn Museum with Ralston Crawford. From Davis, he acquired the concepts of using color as music, with all shapes in a painting positive, no one shape dominating others.

In 1953, he left Stauffer Chemical, determined to pursue his art, and went back to the Deep South where he tried his hand at oil prospecting. In 1957, Shaw returned to Tulane, where he taught and was graduated in 1959 with a Master In Fine Arts (MFA). During this period, Shaw was a teaching assistant to Ida Kohlmeyer and Kurt Kranz, also studying with George Rickey, and particularly with Mark Rothko, who was teaching at Tulane. From Rothko, Shaw acquired his use of color to convey feeling and emotion, and his view that a good painting should communicate the painter's emotions directly to the observer, particularly through color. Rothko taught him, as Shaw puts it, "that painting is a live animal, and the color is its blood." In 1961, Shaw became a permanent resident of New York City, working, over a teaching career of 25 years, as an assistant professor at Columbia University Graduate School of Architecture; acting director of the Brooklyn Museum's Art School, and instructing at Hunter College; Lehman College; the Fashion Institute of Technology and Parsons School for Design at the New School.

== 1960s–1970s ==
While Shaw's mature works derive from his fascination with the rhythms of energy, he had begun to move away from geometric abstraction and gray color tones of the Minimalists for a more fluid and alive style of colors, grids and patterns. He first became known, however, for a series of silhouette paintings from 1962–1966 of energy filled sports action that verged on the abstract with featureless cutout shapes of figures or even body parts involved in action, such as a hand or leg, set against a stark background of two or three contrasting colors, such as white on red and black on gray. By the late 1960s, Shaw had begun to reach into his New Orleans roots of jazz and the bright multi-colors of Mardi Gras and New Orleans houses and subtropical flora. He experimented with solid color panels that made the human-scaled wall spaces part of the painting, reinforcing this in some works by painting the edges of the canvas. In the mid-1970s, he became one of the artists involved in creating the Pattern and Decoration( P&D) movement. He used his own invented patterns taken from rhythmic energy, rather than any directly based on historic patterning systems. His color notes did not completely resolve themselves into larger configurations and predictable patterns. Instead, minute interactions of adjacent colors set up mosaic-like patterns and rhythmic grids of small rectangles and circles. Squares formed by an accumulation of diagonals and shapes were delineated by contrasting colors. Squares stabilized the centers of many of the paintings, while multi-color modulations and harmonies blended and changed across the face of the painting like jazz, the colors and shapes variations on a color theme. He experimented using small mirrors as part of the color patterns to reflect light back to the viewer, as well as incorporating fabric, buttons and ribbons. His series of Emma Lottie paintings from this period were made in remembrance of his father's suffragette mother, who worked to end child labor and have New Orleans create a water and sewage system to end water-born illnesses that plagued the city. Color patterns weave throughout the paintings like quilting, interspersed with bits of ribbon, fabric and gemstones referencing his grandmother's embroidery. Like others in Pattern and Decoration, he became interested in theatrical costuming and set design, and worked with Herbert Machiz, the director, on a number of stage productions, including ‘’Knights of the Roundtable” by Jean Cocteau and “The First Reader”, a musical with words by Gertrude Stein.

== 1980s–2010s ==
In the 1980s, he added a new element, screwing similar squared paintings of various sizes over each other for a layered effect with each layer serving as a pattern and color scheme to counterpoint or complement the others. The most noted of these is “Sunship for John Coltrane” (1990), on loan to and displayed by the Ogden Museum of Southern Art. In the 1990s, he began painting layers over tape, then removing the tape to create patterns, shapes and lines of melodic color as a form of improvisation. While the paintings are abstract and not representational, they use Shaw's scientific view that the world is made up of energized particles in constant flux. Through light's energy source comes color, making colors themselves energy sources that can communicate emotions, moods and perhaps transcendental meaning to the viewer. The grids on a 45 degree angle from this period are not rigid. Instead they are created as lines of dots of color modulations and variations, much like the French Pointillists. The counterpoint of the colors, lines and shapes makes them blend and flow into each other, creating different and echoing sub-patterns within the painting which are “continuously forcing the eye into a scanning motion.” The grid design is further broken up by paint strokes splashed across the painting, which Shaw uses as a Dionysian element of disorder across the Apollonian logic behind the grids. In the 1980s, Shaw began a series of paintings on events in the Torah of the Old Testament utilizing all the elements he had incorporated into his work. He continued on this series of 30 paintings until 2011, when 21 of his sur-abstract paintings were exhibited at St. Peter's Lutheran Church in New York City."Visual Arts". St. Peter's Lutheran Church.

His latter work extended his original modular painting of the mid to late 1960s, when modularity and Minimalism began to be used in painting as well as sculpture. Shaw used arrangements of vertical flat solid color panels designed to be hung apart at specified distances. The interstices are not uniform but varied with human scale. The wall space between the units thus becomes an inseparable part of the painting. Rich, contrasting colors painted on the sides of the panels add to this integration with the wall. The intent is to make the wall less of a barrier or an enclosure to the observer by giving life to the painting-wall as an expanded picture plane that brings unity into the space. Panel dimensions of 8' x 2' add to the human presence in this painting-wall relationship based on Le Corbusier's human module of a man with his hands raised above his head. Panels may be in single units or they may be bolted in pairs. The distances placed between them correspond directly to the panels' different widths of 1' and 2'. Complete units comprise three or four panels in three or four closely related colors. In a rebellion against the limited and somber colors of Minimalism, Shaw's New Orleans background of Mardi Gras influences the brightness, rhythm and color combinations of the units. The modular paintings are based on the Abstract Expressionist view "that reflected color from a panel is vibrating energy which in a large field creates an emotional reaction from an observer than could lead to a sublime feeling." The emotions Shaw hopes to bring are the joys of living and a celebration of life. In January 2017, the National Arts Club in New York City honored Mr. Shaw for his artistic contributions by making him an Honorary Lifetime member.

Shaw died at his home in Brooklyn, New York in October 2019.

== Selected solo exhibitions ==
2016 1GAP Gallery, New York, NY;(https://www.1gapgallery.com/kendallshaw/); 2016 Wake Forest University, Hanes Gallery, Wake-forest, NC;(https://hanesgallery.wfu.edu/kendall-shaw/); 2015 National Arts Club, New York, NY; 2012 Lowe Art Gallery, Hudson Guild, New York, NY (with Danny Simmons); 2011 St. Peter's Lutheran Church New York, NY; 2011 Skoto Gallery, New York, NY; 2007 Ruskin Gallery/East Anglia University, Cambridge, England; 2004 Ogden Museum of Southern Art; Pierro Art Gallery, South Orange, NJ; 2001 Tulane University, New Orleans, LA.; 1999 Marsh Art Gallery, University of Richmond Museums, Richmond, VA.; 1998 The Gallery Space of South Orange, NJ; 1992 Artists Space, New York, NY; 1982, 1981, 1979 Lerner/Heller Gallery, New York, NY; 1976 Alessandra Gallery, New York, NY; 1972 John Bernard Myers Gallery, New York, NY; 1968, 1967, 1965, 1963 Tibor de Nagy Gallery, New York, NY

== Selected group exhibitions ==
2024 Hollis Taggert Gallery, New York, NY, Dynamic Rhythm: Geometric Abstraction From the 1950s to the Present; 2019-2020 Museum of Contemporary Art, Los Angeles, Ca. With Pleasure: Pattern and Decoration in American Art, 1972-1985; 2018-2019 Ogden Museum of Southern Art, New Orleans, La., "BIG"; 2018-2019 Ludwig Forum, Achen, Germany, "Pattern and Decoration:Ornament As Promise"; 2017 I Love John Giorno: curated and produced by Ugo Rondinone. Hunter College and twelve other Manhattan locations; 2016 Blue Door Art Center, Yonkers, NY, "Inclusion"; 2014 Anita Shapolsky Gallery, New York, NY, The Hard Line;(http://www.anitashapolskygallery.com/the-hard-line/); 2014 Tibor De Nagy Gallery, New York, NY, Starting Out: 9 Abstract Painters, 1958-1971; 2014 Anita Shapolsky Gallery, New York, NY, The Expressive Edge of Paper,; 2014 Rush Arts Gallery, New York, NY, "I Kan Do Dat,"curated by Danny Simmons); 2010 Lowe Art Gallery, Hudson Guild, New York, NY, Whitman's Calamas; 2009 Ogden Museum of Southern Art, New Orleans, LA; 2007 Leslie/Lohan Gallery, New York, NY, Artists In the Theatre; 2002 Contemporary Art Center, New Orleans, La. Contemporary Art From the Ogden Museum; 2001 Ogden Museum of Southern Art, New Orleans, LA.; 2000 Gallery 128, New York, NY; 1999, 1998, 1997, 1995, 1994 Lowe Art Gallery, Hudson Guild, New York, NY; 1997 New London Art Society and Gallery, New London, CT.; La Mama La Galleria, New York, NY; 1992;1983 Aaron Berman Gallery, New York, NY; Spectrum Gallery, New York, NY; 1982, 1981 Lerner/Heller Gallery, New York, NY; 1981 University of South Florida, Tampa, FL. Pattern and Decoration; Marilyn Pearl Gallery, New York, NY Pattern and Decoration; Millennium Gallery, New York, NY Pattern Painting; 1980 Neue Galerie Sammlung, Aachen, Germany Les Nouveaux Fauves; Heintz-Holtmann Galerie, Hanover, Germany; Krinzinger Galerie, Innsbruck, Switzerland; Modern Art Gallery, Vienna, Austria; Danny Keller Galerie, Munich, Germany; Basel Art Fair, Basel, Germany; Illinois Wesleyan University, Bloomington, IL. Curator, Pattern and Decoration; 1979 Andre Zarre Gallery, New York, NY Persistent Patterns; Art Sources, Jacksonville, FL. Pattern and Decoration; Galerie Liatowitsch, Basel, Switzerland; Galerie Habermann, Hanover and Cologne, Germany; 1978 Gladstone-Villani Gallery, New York, NY Pattern and Decoration; 1977 Rice University, Houston, TX. Curator, Pattern and Decoration; P.S. 1, New York, NY Pattern Painting; Lehigh University, Bethlehem, PA. Pattern, Grid and System Art; 1976 Alessandra Gallery, New York, NY Pattern Painting; 1974 Brooklyn Museum, New York, NY; Hirshi & Adler Gallery, New York, NY; 1970 Albright-Knox Gallery, Buffalo, NY Modular Painting
