= Rob Wynne =

American visual artist (born 1948)

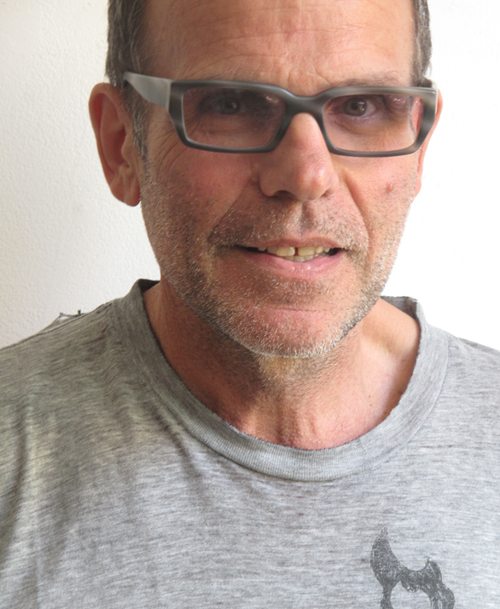
- Born: November 28, 1948 (age 77); New York City
- Education: Pratt Institute, Brooklyn, New York (BA)
- Known for: Visual art
- Awards: Pollock-Krasner Foundation Award
- Website: www.robwynne.net

Rob Wynne (born 1948) is an American visual artist best known for his use of glass to produce abstract and text wall installations. He lives and works in New York City.

== Work ==
Wynne's work spans sculpture, installations, glass, painting, drawing, collage, photography, design, and jewelry. Wynne's early drawings and collages were influenced by the Fluxus movement via Ray Johnson, a seminal figure of Neo-Dada and founder of the New York Correspondence School. Having met Johnson during the 1970s, Wynne says that "through Ray I got interested in the idea of using a typewriter and Western Union, and we developed an epistolary relationship." Wynne once went to Western Union and wrote a telegram to himself that read: "You are still alive."

In the mid-1970s Wynne scored music, opera, and soundscape for the dramatic readings of Marguerite Young's epic novel Miss MacIntosh, My Darling—turning the readings into performances—as part of radio station WBAI's year-long series called The Reading Experiment. The participants included Anaïs Nin, Marian Seldes, Leo Lerman, Michael Wager, Novella Nelson, Osceola Adams, Owen Dodson, Wyatt Emory Cooper, Peggy Cass, Ruth Ford, Earle Hyman. Also for WBAI, Rob Wynne recorded and edited for broadcast Robert Wilson and Philip Glass's avant-garde opera Einstein on the Beach and Robert Wilson and Alan Lloyd's Letter for Queen Victoria. In 1976, he scored Joan Jonas's I Want to Live in the Country (And Other Romances), counterbalancing her visuals and readings from her journal with music evoking open spaces.

Wynne's use of industrial materials in his work, such as his Xerox art, was a part of his first installation, Sphere Redux, at The Kitchen in New York City, in 1981. It consisted of two rear screen projections of a large rotating glass marble, scored with opera and breaking glass, synchronized with video monitors arranged along the base of one wall, hung with blueprint blow-ups of glass marbles, Moon rocks, and caves, intermixed with portraits of friends whose features were overshadowed by masks.

In the 1990s, Wynne's exhibitions of paintings, sculptures, and prints at the Holly Solomon Gallery became installations; his works set against wallpaper with images from the opera La Sonnambula (Bellini) or The Flies (Sartre).

In recent years, Wynne has become interested in glass as a medium. In the course of a visit to a glass foundry. "There", Wynne says, "I started this experiment. It was purely by accident. I was holding a ladle of molten glass when it slipped out of my hands and spilled onto the floor, making a huge splat, which was absolutely spectacular. And at that moment I thought it was a kind of cosmic explosion and that it would be so interesting to fix it permanently, silver it and see it really glimmer. That led me to realize that I could control it somewhat more than just letting it fall out of a ladle and I could start making actual letters."

Wynne began to use glass to create large scale text pieces. Wynne explained that his glass text pieces were intended to "be much more reflective so when you are reading them you see yourself reading them." Olivia Ryder for UrbanGlass writes, "He effectively reinstates that reflective nature with his literary creations. The disassociated words and phrases, adopts the viewers voice and adds a layer of introspection, disrupting the barriers between art and viewer."

In Wynne's 2018 show, Float at the Brooklyn Museum of Art, he installed sixteen works within the American Art galleries. The works were placed in direct dialogue with selected works from the collection. Barbara A. MacAdam from the Brooklyn Rail described Wynne's installations, "The objects of the gallery—the artifacts, paintings, sculpture, and furniture are reflected upon by the artist, literally and figuratively, and become a part of his, and our, stream of consciousness."

In his work, Wynne freely appropriates fragments of texts and images taken from literature, opera, theater, and conversation. In addition to his work in glass, Wynne works with smoke, embroidery, paint, thread, bronze, and ceramics.

Rob Wynne: Obstacle Illusion, a major monograph on Wynne's work featuring texts by A.M. Homes, Michael Duncan, Ed Leffingwell and Linda Yablonsky, was published in Fall of 2023 by Gregory R. Miller & Co.

== Solo exhibitions ==
Solo exhibitions of Wynne's work include:

- Afterglow, Craig F. Starr Gallery, New York, 2023
- Radiant Darkness, Galerie Mitterand, Paris, 2023
- Reflection, Gavlak Gallery, Palm Beach, FL, 2022
- Speechless, Locks Gallery, Philadelphia, PA, 2020
- Float, Brooklyn Museum, Brooklyn, NY, 2018
- OH2/H2O, GAVLAK Gallery, Palm Beach FL, 2017
- Blindsight, Arthur Roger Gallery, New Orleans, LA, 2016
- A Distant Mirror, Galerie Mitterrand, Paris, France, 2016
- Blue Ghost, 39 Great Jones, New York, NY, 2016
- The Backstage of the Universe, Gavlak Gallery, Los Angeles, CA, 2014
- The Lure of Unknown Regions Beyond the Rim of Experience, Locks Gallery, Philadelphia, PA., 2013
- The Green Ray, Gavlak Gallery, Palm Beach, Florida, 2013
- I Remember Ceramic Castles, Mermaids & Japanese Bridges, Norton Museum of Art, West Palm Beach, Florida, 2012
- Remember Me, Galerie Mitterrand, Paris, France, 2012
- Incognito, Locks Gallery, Philadelphia, PA, 2011
- Kismet, Gavlak Gallery, Palm Beach, Florida, 2009
- Like the Flickering of a Candle, Locks Gallery, Philadelphia, PA., 2008
- The Heartbeat of a Bird, Craig Starr Associates, New York City, 2006
- French Kiss, Galerie Mitterrand, Paris, France (curated), 2006
- Imitation and Disguise, Galerie Mitterrand, Paris, France, 2004
- New Work, Galerie Edward Mitterrand, Geneva, Switzerland, 2001
- You're Dreaming, Holly Solomon Gallery, New York City, 1999
- Breathe, Rebecca Ibel Gallery, Columbus Ohio, 1999
- Rob Wynne: Glass Sculpture and Word Drawings, Galerie Mitterrand, Paris, France, 1998
- Sleepwalking, Holly Solomon Gallery, New York City, 1996
- Window Shopping, Grey Art Gallery, New York University, New York City, 1994
- Sphere Redux, The Kitchen, New York City, (installation), 1981

== Group exhibitions ==
Selected group exhibitions include:

- Visible Traces (Mountain Water Air), Lévy Gorvy, NYC, 2019
- Something About a Tree, Curated by Linda Yablonsky, The Flag Art Foundation, New York, NY, 2013
- High Drama: Eugene Berman and the Legacy of the Melancholic Sublime, curated by Michael Duncan, traveling exhibit: Georgia Museum of Fine Art, Athens Georgia; McNay Art Museum, Austin, Texas; Long Beach Museum of Art, Long Beach, California, 2005
- Officina/America, Galleria D'arte Moderna, Bologna, Italy, (catalogue), 2002
- Slow Art: Painting in New York Now, P.S. 1 Museum, Long Island City, New York, 1992
- About Place: Contemporary American Landscape, P.S. 1 Museum, Long Island City, New York, (catalogue), 1986

== Collections ==
Rob Wynne's work is held in the following public collections:

- Centre Pompidou, Paris
- The Museum of Modern Art, New York City
- The Whitney Museum of Art, New York City
- The New York Public Library, The Spencer Collection, New York City
- Smithsonian Archives of American Art (Holly Solomon Gallery Records), Washington, DC

== Publications ==
- Rob Wynne: Obstacle Illusion (New York: Gregory R. Miller & Co., 2023). Essay by A.M. Homes. Texts by Michael Duncan and Ed Leffingwell. Interview by Linda Yablonsky.
- Rob Wynne: IN COG NITO (Philadelphia: Locks Arts, 2011). Essay by Alice Quinn.
- Rob Wynne : Like the Flickering of a Candle (Philadelphia: Locks Art, 2008). Essay by Carter Ratcliff.
- Rob Wynne: Afterglow (Munich: Galerie Oliver Schweden) Essays by Francis Naumann and David Rimanelli.
