= Mary Grigoriadis =

American artist (born 1942)

Mary Grigoriadis (born 1942) is an American artist known for her paintings in the pattern and decoration movement.In 2013, Roberta Smith, writing in The New York Times, described Mary Grigoriadis's role in the emergence of the Pattern and Decoration movement: "In the early 1970s the Pattern and Decoration movement was among the early, and welcome, warning signs that American painting could be other than abstract and minimal. And the paintings of Mary Grigoriadis were among the first signs of Pattern and Decoration."

== Biography ==
Gigoriadis earned a bachelor's degree from Barnard College in 1963. In 1965 she received a Master of Fine Art degree from Columbia College, New York. She was a member of the Pattern and Decoration art movement and one of the four original founders of the first women's cooperative gallery in America, A.I.R (Artists In Residence) in 1972. Her daughter is the journalist Vanessa Grigoriadis. Her personal website is found under her name, MaryGrigoriadis.com.

Her work is included in the collections of the Whitney Museum of American Art, the Smithsonian American Art Museum, and the National Museum of Women in the Arts.
