= Joyce Kozloff =

American artist (born 1942)

- Born: Joyce Blumberg; December 14, 1942 (age 83); Somerville, New Jersey
- Known for: Painting
- Movement: Pattern and Decoration; Feminist art movement
- Spouse: Max Kozloff (m. 1967; died 2025)
- Children: 1 (Nikolas Kozloff)
- Website: joycekozloff.net

Joyce Kozloff (born December 14, 1942) is an American artist known for her paintings, murals, and public art installations. She was one of the original members of the Pattern and Decoration movement and an early artist in the 1970s feminist art movement, including as a founding member of the Heresies collective and (revealed in 2026) of Guerrilla Girls as Liubov Popova.

She has been active in the women's and peace movements throughout her life. Since the early 1990s, her work has drawn extensively on cartography and patterns.

== Personal life and education ==
Joyce Blumberg was born to Adele Rosenberg and Leonard Blumberg on December 14, 1942 in Somerville, New Jersey. Leonard, born in New Jersey, was an attorney. Adele was active in community organizations. Both of her parents' families had emigrated from Lithuania. She had two younger brothers.

During the summer of 1959, she studied art at New York's Art Students League. In the summer of 1962 she attended Rutgers University and the following summer she attended the Università di Firenze. In 1964 she earned a Bachelor of Fine Arts from the Carnegie Institute of Technology. She then attended Columbia University and received a Masters of Fine Arts in 1967.

She married Max Kozloff on July 2, 1967. They have a son. Kozloff has lived primarily in New York since 1964. Their marriage lasted until Max's death in 2025.

== Career ==
=== Feminist art movement ===
For us, there weren't women in the galleries and museums, so we formed our own galleries, we curated our own exhibitions, we formed our own publications, we mentored one another, we even formed schools for feminist art. We examined the content of the history of art, and we began to make different kinds of art forms based on our experiences as women. So it was both social and something even beyond; in our case, it came back into our own studios.

— Joyce Kozloff

She joined with other women in the arts in 1971 to form the Los Angeles Council of Women Artists, a group that organized the first protests about the lack of women included in the Los Angeles County Museum of Art's exhibitions and collections. Upon returning to New York, Kozloff continued to be active in the women artists' movement. She joined the Ad Hoc Committee of Women Artists and was a founding member of the Heresies Collective in 1975, which produced the quarterly magazine Heresies: A Feminist Publication on Art and Politics.

In the summer of 1973 Kozloff lived in Mexico. She visited Morocco in 1975 and Turkey in 1978. During her visits she studied the countries' decorative traditions and ornaments. In the 1970s, she observed that the decorative arts were the domain of women and non-western artists, and wrote that the hierarchy among the arts had privileged the production of European and American men, fueling her position as a feminist and inspired her interest in pattern design. With Valerie Jaudon, she co-authored the widely anthologized "Art Hysterical Notions of Progress and Culture" (1978), in which they explained how they thought sexist and racist assumptions underlaid Western art history discourse. They reasserted the value of ornamentation and aesthetic beauty – qualities assigned to the feminine sphere.

Kozloff was mentored and inspired by Miriam Schapiro, Nancy Spero, Ida Applebroog and May Stevens. She was interviewed for the film !Women Art Revolution.

=== Pattern and Decoration ===
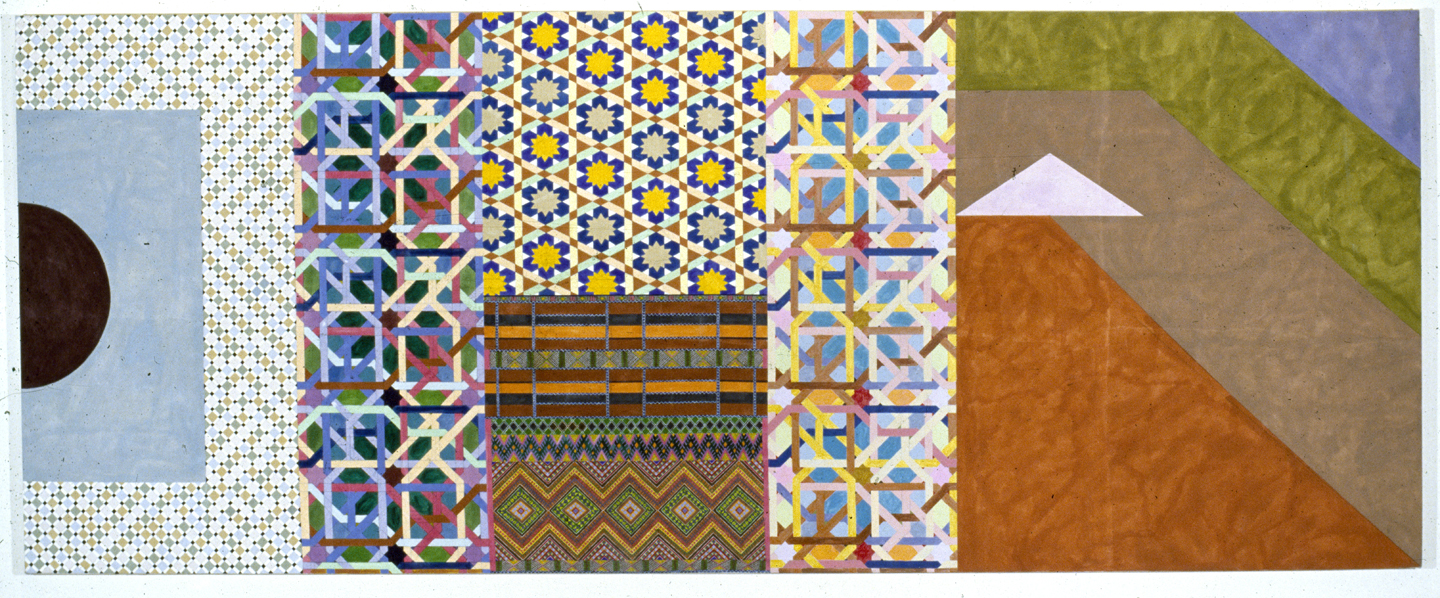
Three Portals...pink triangle

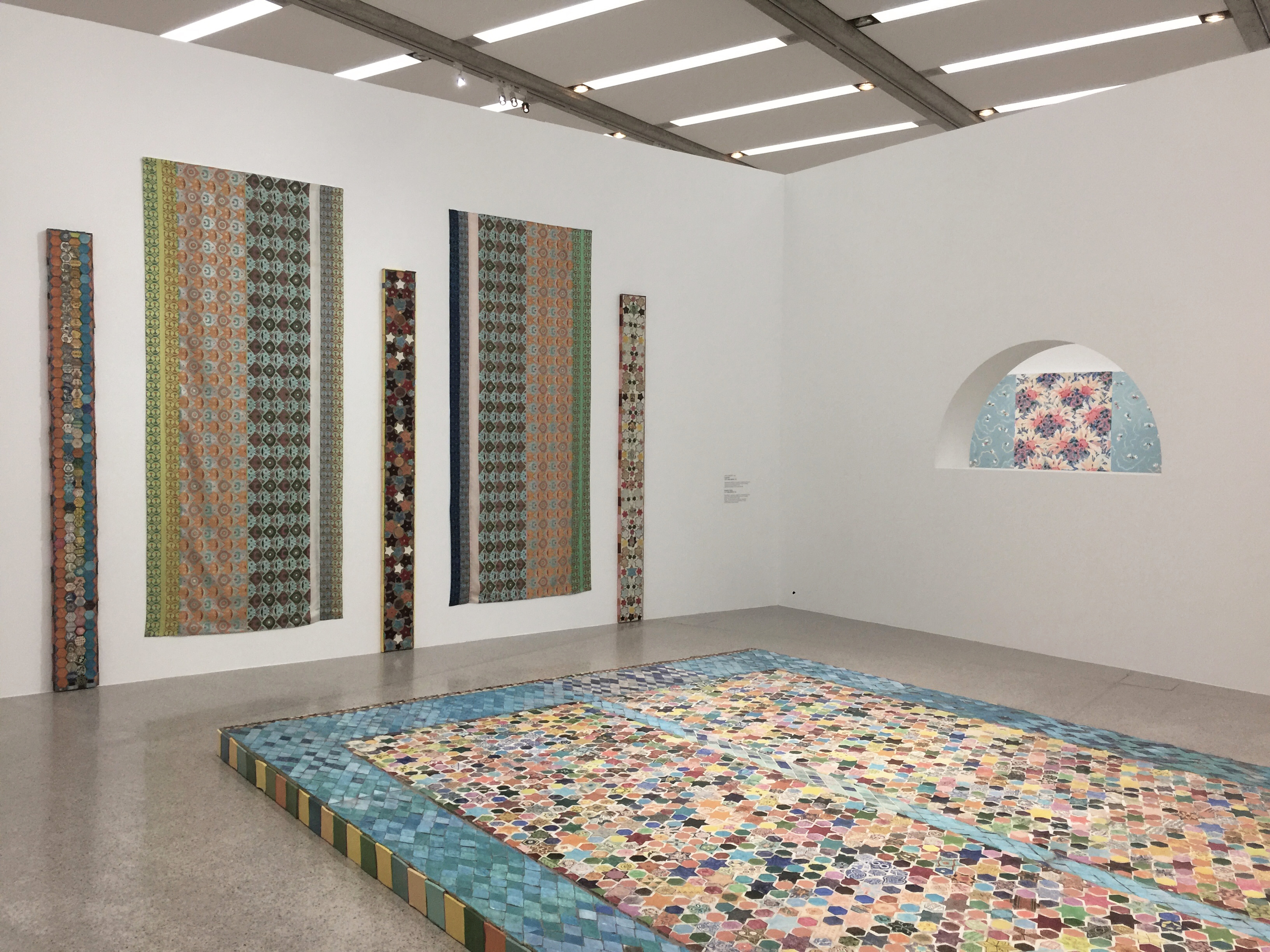
An Interior Decorated

Beginning in 1973, wishing to break down the western hierarchy between "high art" and decoration, Kozloff created large paintings, drawing upon worldwide patterns, juxtaposing ornamental passages across an expansive field. In 1975, she began to meet with artists Miriam Schapiro, Tony Robbin, Robert Zakanitch, Robert Kushner, Valerie Jaudon and others pursuing related ideas; they formed the Pattern and Decoration movement.

During the late 1970s, she produced An Interior Decorated, a travelling installation composed of hanging silkscreen textile panels; hand painted, glazed tile pilasters; lithographs on Chinese silk paper; and a tiled floor composed of thousands of individually executed images on interlocking stars and hexagons. The project was redesigned for every space in which it was exhibited in 1979 and 1980. Just as her paintings had nonwestern origins, for this installation, she compiled a personal, visual anthology of the decorative arts from dozens of sources, including Caucasian kilims, İznik and Catalan tiles, Seljuk brickwork, and Native American pottery. Critic Carrie Rickey wrote that the installation was "where painting meets architecture, where art meets craft, where personal commitment meets public art".

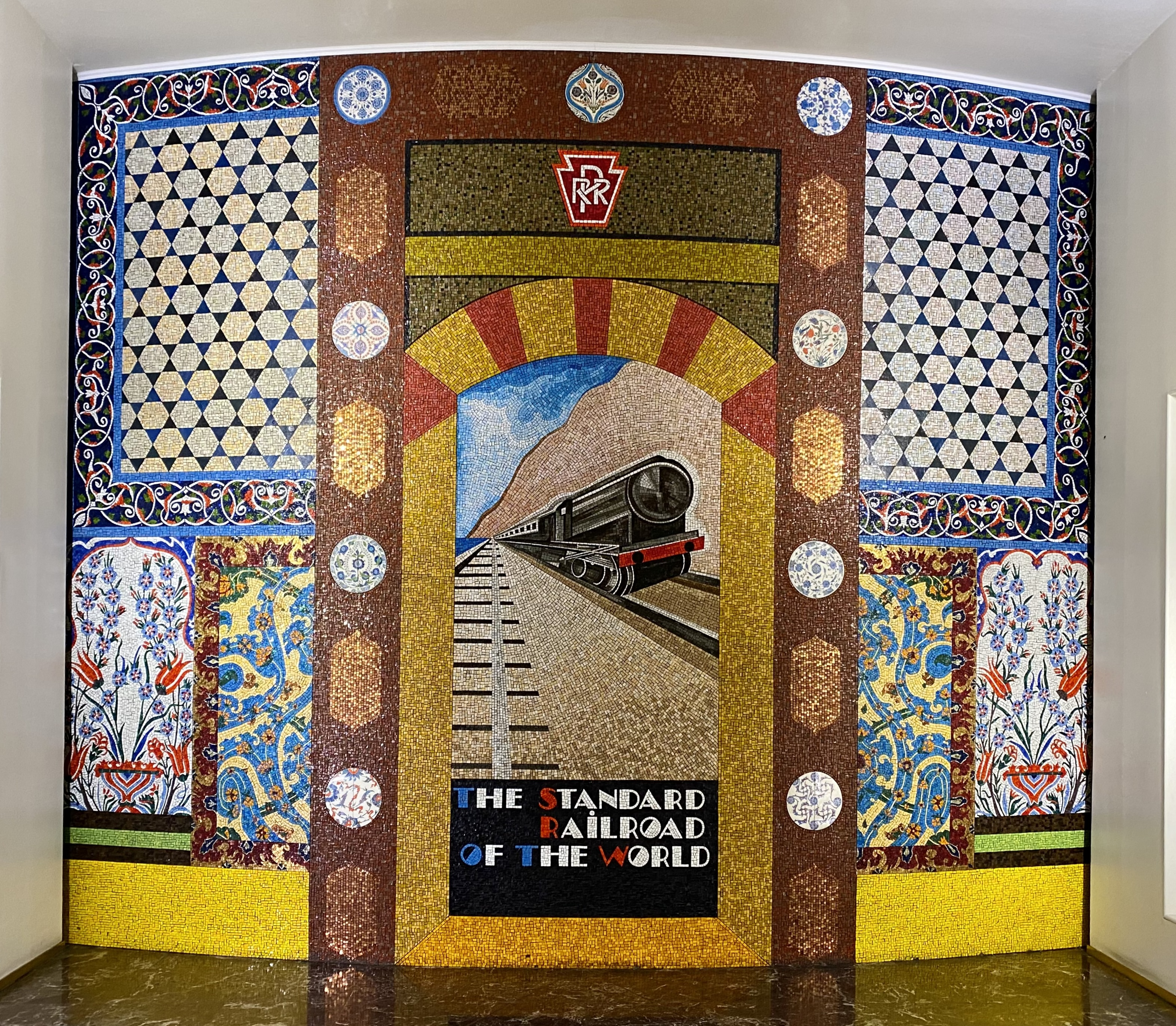
Topkapi Pullman

=== Public art ===
Kozloff became interested in public art while studying under Robert Lepper at Carnegie Mellon. He taught the Oakland Project, in which students went out into the Oakland neighborhood and made art documenting the infrastructure, buildings and people. She said, "That was my initiation into public art – into the world outside". One of her first works of public art, a mural in the Harvard Square subway station in Cambridge, was the result of a competition. Most of her other public projects were directly commissioned. Her initial large scale pieces were composed of interlocking patterns of glass mosaic and/or ceramic tiles, an extension of her earlier gallery art.

She began incorporating images from the cities' histories to make the works site specific. For instance, at the Suburban Station in Philadelphia, she substituted an image of William Penn for the Good Shepherd in an appropriation of the Byzantine Tomb of Galla Placidia in Ravenna. Her public works were often collaborations, with input from the public, community boards, architects, and arts patrons.

Kozloff created 16 public art projects, including:

- 1983 - Bay Area Victorian, Bay Area Deco, Bay Area Funk, at San Francisco Airport's International Terminal
- 1984 - an homage to Frank Furness at Wilmington Station in Delaware
- 1984 - Humboldt-Hospital Buffalo Metro Rail, Buffalo, New York.
- 1985 - New England Decorative Arts, her first public mural, at Harvard Square subway station in Cambridge.
- 1985 - One Penn Center, Suburban Train Station, her first completely mosaic work, in Philadelphia
- 1987 - "D" for Detroit, Financial District Station: Detroit People Mover elevated rail system, Michigan
- 1990 - Pasadena, the City of Roses, Plaza las Fuentes, Pasadena, California
- 1991 - Caribbean Festival Arts, Public School 218, New York City
- 1993 - The Movies: Fantasies and Spectacles, Los Angeles Metro’s 7th and Flower Station
- 1995 - Around the World on the 44th Parallel, Memorial Library, Mankato State University
- 1997 - Four cartographic representations based on ancient charts of the Chesapeake Bay area, Reagan National Airport, Washington, DC. It is a marble mosaic.
- 2001 - a floor piece for Chubu Cultural Center, Kurayoshi, Japan
- 2003 - Dreaming: The Passage of Time, United States Consulate, Istanbul, Turkey.

She was interested in public art because it makes art accessible to everyone, and not just the public and private collectors. She said she became disheartened after the 1990s political "culture wars", feeling she would have to censor her creative expression to create acceptable "safe art", and stopped vying for public art commissions.

=== Artist's books ===
In the late 1980s she produced a series of 32 watercolors entitled Patterns of Desire—Pornament is Crime, published by Hudson Hills Press in 1990 with an introductory essay by Linda Nochlin. This book by a feminist artist juxtaposed the obsessive nature of both decoration and pornography in many traditions, to comic and revelatory effect. A founding member of the New York activist group, Artists Against the War (2003), Kozloff has been increasingly preoccupied with that theme. In 2001, she began Boy's Art, a series of twenty-four drawings based on illustrations, diagrams, and maps depicting historic battles, over which she collaged copies of her son Nikolas’s childhood war drawings and details from old master paintings. An oversized artist’s book of these works was published by D.A.P./Distributed Art Publishers in 2003 with an introductory essay by Robert Kushner. In 2010, Charta Books Ltd. published Kozloff’s third artist’s book, China is Near, which includes a conversation with Barbara Pollack. For this publication, the artist photographed the China most accessible to her, New York’s Chinatown, a few blocks from her home, as well as other Chinatowns within range. She copied old charts of the Silk Road and downloaded online maps of all the places in the world called China. It’s a bright, glossy mash-up of contemporary kitsch and historic commerce, a guide to the global highway.

=== Map themes ===
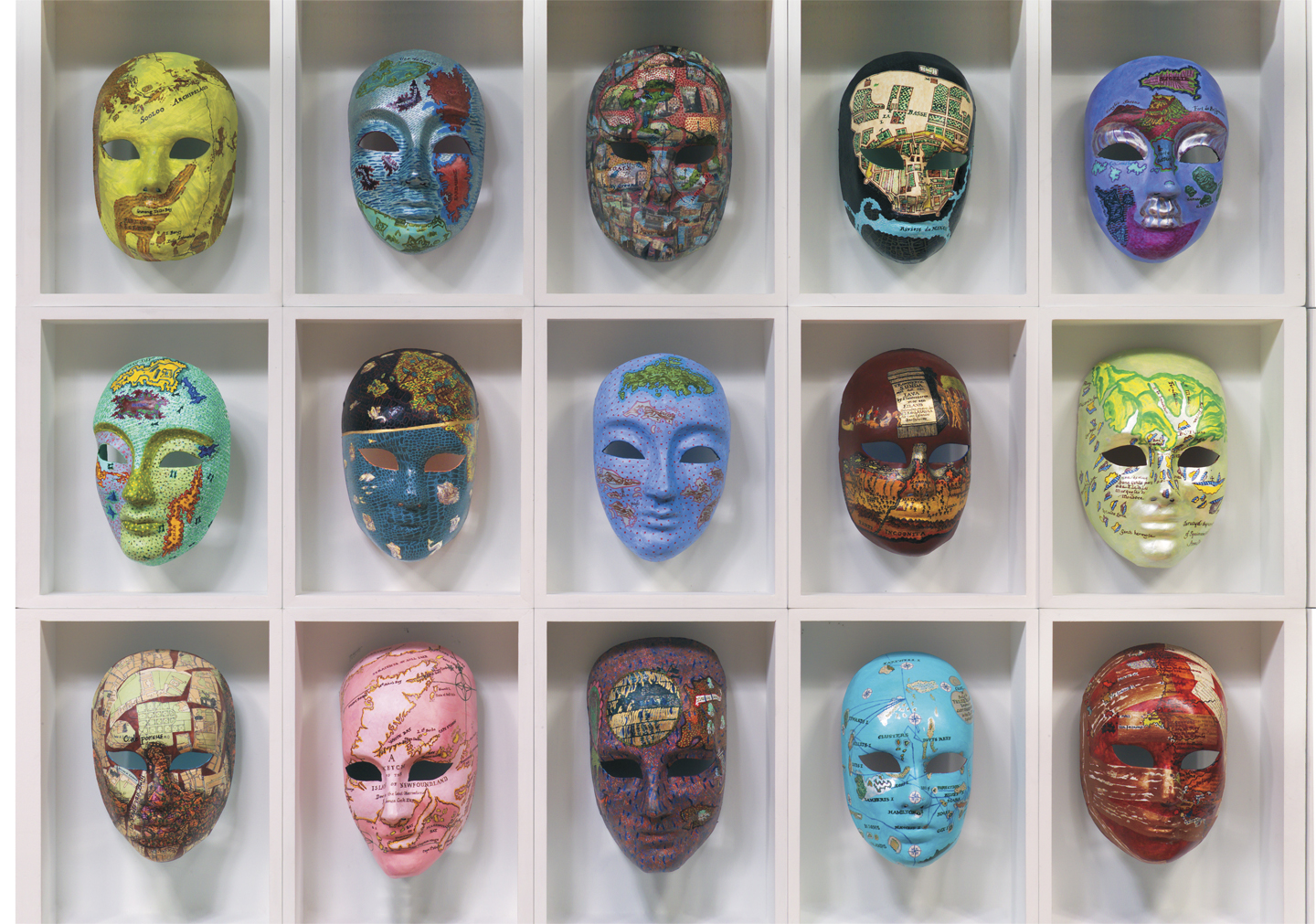
15 of the Voyages masks

Kozloff has utilized mapping since the early 1990s as a structure for her long-time passions - history, geography, popular arts and culture. In Los Angeles Becoming Mexico City Becoming Los Angeles (1993) and Imperial Cities (1994) she painted cities she knew, overlaying images and patterns reflective of their colonial pasts. She subsequently examined bodies of water such as the Baltic Sea in Bodies of Water, the Mekong and Amazon Rivers in Mekong and memory and Calvino’s Cities on the Amazon (1995–1997). In her series Knowledge (1998–1999), consisting of 65 small (8 x 10") frescoes and six tabletop globes, she depicted the inaccuracies of maps from earlier times, particularly during the Age of Discovery, to reveal the arbitrary nature of what can be known.

In 1999–2000, during Kozloff’s year-long fellowship at the American Academy in Rome, she executed Targets, a walk-in globe 9 feet (2.7 m) in diameter made of 24 gore-shaped sections. She painted an aerial map on the inside surface of each section to depict a site bombed by the United States military between the years 1945 and 2000. Upon entering, the visitor is completely surrounded, and if he/she makes a sound there is an echo amplified by the enclosed space. Two multi-panel, 16-foot (4.9 m)-long works followed, each in the form of the flattened gores of a globe (2002): Spheres of Influence (Kozloff’s "terrestrial piece") and Dark and Light Continents (her "celestial piece").

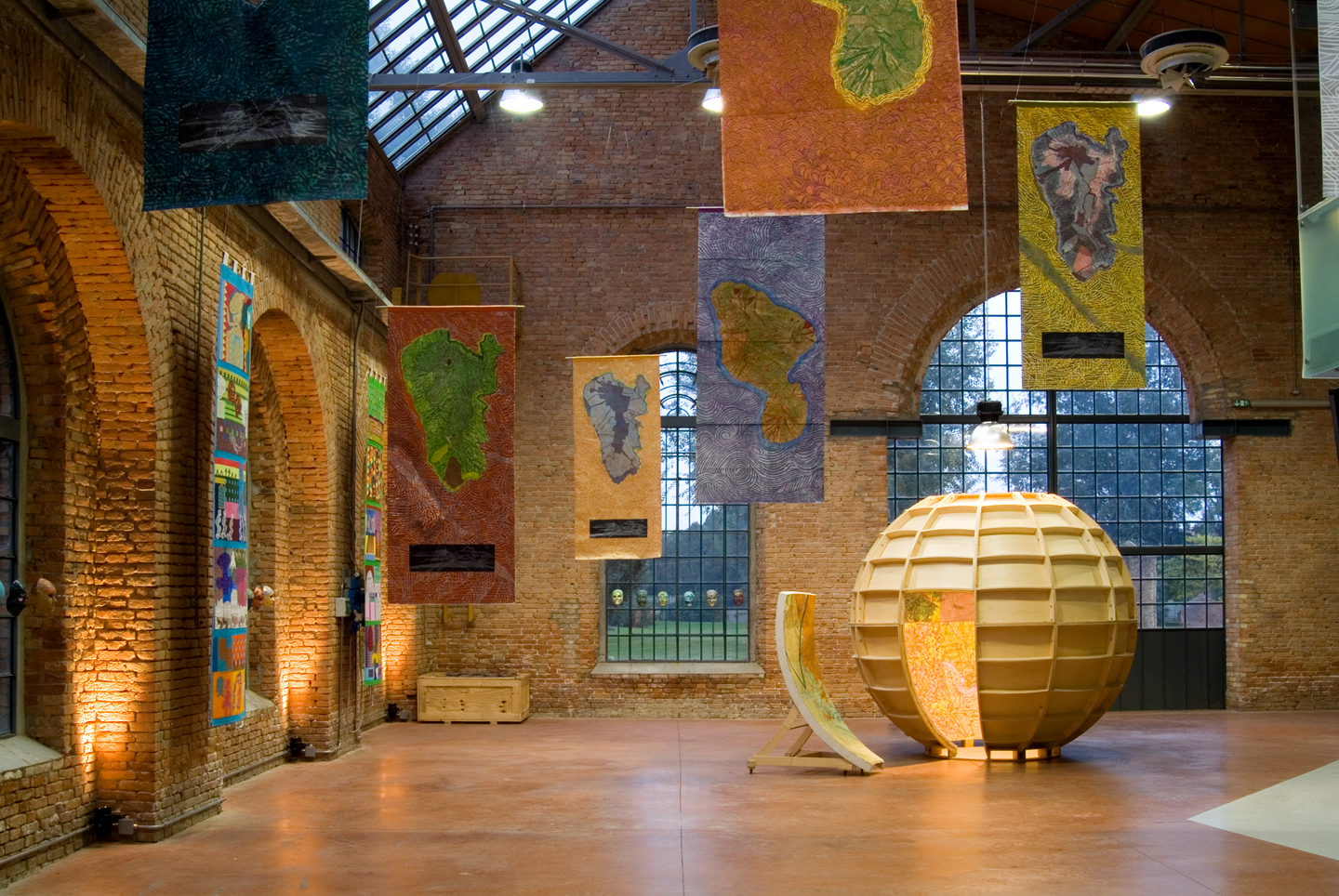
Voyages and Targets

For several years, Kozloff worked on a huge installation about the history of western colonialism, shown at Thetis in the Venice Arsenale (2006), Voyages + Targets. She painted islands across the world on 64 Venetian Carnival masks situated inside windows with light streaming through their eyes; hanging from the ceiling and along the brick walls, there were banners (Voyages: Carnevale, Voyages: Maui, and Voyages: Kaho’olawe) with maps of islands in the Pacific and jazzy carnival imagery as it has morphed around the planet. Beginning in 2006, Kozloff’s ongoing tondi (round paintings) began with Renaissance cosmological charts crisscrossed by the tracks of satellites in space, an imaginary projection of future (star) wars (the days and hours and moments of our lives, Helium on the Moon, Revolver).

"Descartes' Heart" is based on the heart-shaped map, Cosmographia universalis ab Orontio olin descripta, by Renaissance cartographer Giovanni Cimerlino (Verona, 1566). On the top is a totally wacky map called Mechanical Universe by Descartes (1644). The tondi were followed by an 18-foot (5.5 m)-long triptych, The Middle East: Three Views (2010), a projection of the contested areas in that region during the Roman era, the Cold War, and currently. The maps, based on photographs taken by NASA’s Hubble Space Telescope, float in deep space among the stars, as if they had been dislodged from the earth.

In 2011-2012, Kozloff completed JEEZ, a 12’ x 12’ painting based on the Ebstorf map, a 13th - century circular mappa mundi. It depicted Biblical stories alongside pagan myths within a vision of the world as it was then known. Christ’s body served as a symbolic and literal frame. She drew upon a wide range of artistic practices, incorporating 125 images of Christ from worldwide sources. Archetypal figures accumulate, morphing from holy portraits into a rogue’s gallery of mismatched characters. Its companion, The Tempest, was completed in 2014, a 10’ x 10’ work based on a Chinese 18th century world map, in which the Great Wall traverses the upper levels and turbulent seas surround the land mass. Applied to the surface, there are collaged excerpts from more than 40 years of her art, as well as 3D miniature globes. These two playful pieces explore eastern and western systems for representing the world.

From 2013-2015, Kozloff united the patterns and maps by reinventing two 1977 artists’ books, If I Were a Botanist and If I Were an Astronomer: their pages were based on geometric Islamic star patterns. She expanded them to mural scale, layered with outtakes from earlier projects. Their dense, saturated color and joyful aura disguise the embedded political content, visible on closer inspection. And then she discovered a cache of her childhood drawings at her parents’ home, created between ages 9–11, which brought her further back in time. She incorporated these drawings, many of which are cartographic, into paintings of early maps (Girlhood, 2017). From their different stages of life, the young girl and the adult woman began to shift back and forth from 1950s America to the present.

In 2018, Kozloff began work on a General Services Administration commission for a new federal courthouse in Greenville, SC. There she saw Confederate flags waving in graveyards alongside monuments to the rebel leaders. This triggered her Uncivil Wars series, 2020-2021, which incorporates US Civil War battle maps - created by officers and soldiers from both the Confederate and Union armies - to depict a history that is currently still contested. Viruses erupt throughout the maps, reflecting the pandemic that locked down state, national, and international borders - and symbolizing the viral racism and xenophobia that permeate our country.

== Awards and honors ==
- 1975 - American Association of University Women's Selected Professions Fellowship
- 1977 - National Endowment for the Arts Individual Artist grant in Painting
- 1985 - National Endowment for the Arts Individual Artist grant in Drawings, Prints and Artists’ Books
- 1992 - Rockefeller Foundation Bellagio fellowship
- 1999-2000 - Jules Guerin Rome Prize, American Academy in Rome
- 2002 - Elected into the National Academy of Design
- 2004 - John Simon Guggenheim Memorial Foundation fellowship
- 2005 - Alumni Award, Carnegie Mellon University
- 2009 - Lifetime Achievement Award from the Women’s Caucus for Art
- 2011 - ArtTable Artist Honor
- 2015 - Honorary Doctorate, Carnegie Mellon University, Pittsburgh, PA
- 2016 - Honorary Doctorate, Institute for Doctoral Studies in the Visual Arts, Portland, ME
- 2017 - Purchase Prize, American Academy of Arts and Letters
- 2022 - Honorary Vice President of the National Association of Women Artists

== Collections ==
Her art is in numerous museum collections, including:

- Albright-Knox Art Gallery, Buffalo, NY
- Brooklyn Museum, Brooklyn, NY
- Fogg Art Museum, Harvard University, Cambridge, MA
- Indianapolis Museum of Art, Indianapolis, IN
- Jewish Museum, New York, NY
- Library of Congress, Washington, DC
- Los Angeles County Museum of Art, Los Angeles, CA
- M. H. de Young Memorial Museum, San Francisco, CA
- Museum of Contemporary Art, Los Angeles, CA
- Pennsylvania Academy of the Fine Arts, Philadelphia, PA
- Metropolitan Museum of Art, New York, NY
- MIT List Visual Arts Center, Cambridge, MA
- Museum of Fine Arts, Santa Fe, NM
- Museum of Modern Art, New York, NY
- National Academy of Design, NY
- National Gallery of Art, Washington, DC
- National Museum of Women in the Arts, Washington, DC
- Ludwig Forum für Internationale Kunst (formerly Neue Galerie Sammlung Ludwig), Aachen, Germany
- New Jersey State Museum, Trenton, NJ
- Smithsonian American Art Museum, Washington, DC
- Whitney Museum of American Art, New York, NY
- Yale University Art Museum, New Haven, CT

== Exhibitions ==
Kozloff has had group and solo exhibitions since 1970 in many US cities, including New York, Philadelphia, Boston, Los Angeles, Chicago, and Washington, DC She had a traveling exhibition with her husband Max, "Crossed Purposes", that started in Youngstown, Ohio and traveled to eight other museums and university galleries in the US from 1998 to 2000. International exhibitions include Italy, Germany, the Netherlands, Belgium, Argentina, and Denmark.

Most recently, Kozloff's work has been included in several national and international museum exhibitions focusing on the Pattern and Decoration movement: With Pleasure: Pattern and Decoration in American Art 1972-1985, Museum of Contemporary Art, Los Angeles, CA (2019-2020); Less is a Bore: Maximalist Art & Design, Institute for Contemporary Art, Boston, MA (2019); Pattern and Decoration: Ornament as Promise, Ludwig Forum, Aachen, Germany, Museum Moderner Kunst Stiftung Vienna, Austria, and Ludwig Museum, Budapest, Hungary (2018-2019); Pattern, Decoration & Crime, MAMCO, Geneva, Switzerland, and Le Consortium, Dijon, France (2018-2019).

Kozloff is represented by DC Moore Gallery in New York City and has been exhibiting there since 1997.

== Publications ==
- Joyce Kozloff. China Is Near. Interview by Barbara Pollack. Milano: Charta, 2010.
- Joyce Kozloff. Boys' Art. Introduction by Robert Kushner. New York: Distributed Art Publishers, Inc., 2003.
- Joyce Kozloff. Patterns of Desire. Introduction by Linda Nochlin. New York: Hudson Hills Press, 1990.
- Joyce Kozloff and Zucker, Barbara. “The Women’s Movement: Still a ‘source of strength’ or ‘one big bore’?” ARTnews, April 1976, 48-50.
- Joyce Kozloff. “Thoughts on My Art”. Name Book I. Chicago: Name Gallery, 1977, 63-68.
- Joyce Kozloff. “An Ornamented Joke”. Artforum, December 1986.
- Joyce Kozloff. “The Kudzu Effect (or the rise of a new academy)”. Public Art Review, Fall/Winter 1996, 41.
- Joyce Kozloff. “Portals”. Public Art Dialogue. Abingdon, Oxon, UK: Taylor & Francis, 2014.
