= Melissa Miller (artist) =

American artist

- Born: 1951 (age 74–75); Houston, Texas, United States
- Education: University of New Mexico
- Known for: Painting, drawing, sculpture
- Awards: Anonymous Was A Woman Award, National Endowment for the Arts, Texas Commission on the Arts
- Website: Melissa Miller

Melissa Miller, Flood, oil on linen, 59" × 95", 1983. Collection of The Museum of Fine Arts, Houston.

Melissa Miller (born 1951) is an American painter who is best known for what Art in America called "raucous allegorical paintings" of animals that balance storytelling, psychological insight and behavioral observation with technical virtuosity and formal rigor.

She rose to prominence during a rebirth in figurative painting and narrative content in the early 1980s championed by curators such as Marcia Tucker and Barbara Rose, who both selected Miller for prominent surveys (respectively, "Paradise Lost/Paradise Regained" at the 1984 Venice Biennial and "Fresh Paint" at PS1, 1985). Rose identified Miller among a group of iconoclastic "rule breakers," describing her work as "a wild kingdom … gone slightly berserk" in the struggle for survival, whose intensity recalled Delacroix. In a later Artforum review, Donald Kuspit called Miller's paintings "apocalyptic allegories" executed with meticulous old-master methods that articulated psychic states, existential problems and ecological concerns. Miller has exhibited at museums throughout the United States, including the Whitney Museum, New Museum, San Francisco Museum of Modern Art (SFMOMA), Museum of Fine Arts, Houston, and Hirshhorn Museum. Her work belongs to the public art collections of the Museum of Modern Art, National Museum of Women in the Arts, Albright-Knox Gallery and Museum of Fine Arts, Houston, among others, and she has received the Anonymous Was A Woman Award and Texas Artist of the Year Award. Miller lives and works in Austin, Texas.

== Life and career ==
Miller was born in Houston, Texas and spent much of her life in rural central Texas and the mountains of northern New Mexico. She earned a BFA from University of New Mexico (1974) and spent a summer at the Yale Summer School of Music and Art, where she began to shift away from her Abstract Expressionist training toward landscape and figurative painting, seeking to create more accessible work.

Miller attracted early notice for exhibitions at the Dallas Museum of Fine Arts, Laguna Gloria Art Museum and Contemporary Arts Museum Houston, shows curated by early supporter Marcia Tucker in Austin and New Orleans (1979, 1980), and finally, the Venice Biennial (1984), which brought national and international attention. During that time, Miller was also selected for the Whitney (1983), SFMOMA (1984) and Corcoran Gallery of Art (1993) biennials, and began exhibiting at the Holly Solomon Gallery (New York, 1984–95) and Texas Gallery (Houston, 1983–95).

In the second half of her career, Miller had continued to exhibit widely in museums such as the Museum of Fine Arts, Houston and The Grace Museum and at the Betty Moody (Houston) and Talley Dunn (Dallas) galleries since the early 2000s. In addition to painting, Miller taught at the University of Texas at Austin from 1998 until 2011, when she retired as Associate Professor Emerita; previously, she taught at University of Texas at San Antonio, Southern Methodist University and Skowhegan School of Painting and Sculpture.

== Critical reception ==
Melissa Miller, New Skin, oil on linen, 64" x 72", 1988. Collection of the Hirshhorn Museum and Sculpture Garden, Washington DC.

Miller arrived at a mature style and achieved recognition fairly early in her career, despite being geographically (Texas) and stylistically outside the mainstream of contemporary art. Critics such as New York Times's Michael Brenson describe her work as "steeped in tradition," recalling classical history paintings, Dutch still lifes, 19th-century naturalism, American luminism and regionalism, and the history of animal representation from Sir Edwin Landseer and Henri Rousseau to the Blue Reiter group; others note wider influences (acknowledged by Miller) that include Japanese prints, Persian miniatures, Chinese scroll painting, and Native American dances.

Miller's tableaux depict realistic yet subtly anthropomorphized animals in dramas that range from alarming to fantastical or wry and comment allegorically on wildlife (predator and prey, adaptation, survival, climate and ecological threat) and shared human themes (emotions, fears, interaction, displacement). Reviews emphasize Miller's technique and formal concerns as much as her content, in particular, noting her expressive, varied brushwork, idiosyncratic color, and sense of light and pattern. Arts Magazine suggested that her interest in animal subjects resulted as much from the opportunities to "exploit the sensuality, physicality, and tactility of the painted surface" as emotional, visual and allegorical concerns; ARTnews observed that her paintings display a "remarkable conjunction of baroque composition"—recalling tumultuous hunting scenes by Delacroix, Rubens, and da Vinci—and Abstract Expressionist immediacy with regard to gesture, color and surface.

== Work ==
Miller’s figurative paintings and drawings of the later 1970s arose out of her affinity for rural Texas and New Mexico environments and behavioral observation, and often portrayed lively, high-colored, seemingly ordinary farm vignettes (barnyard scenes, picnics) featuring both animals and people. By the early 1980s, she shifted completely to scenes featuring animals—including exotic species—in moments of apprehension, fury or joy, finding in them more vital and immediate expressive possibilities. Works such as Untitled (Tigers) (1982) and Leopard Dance (1983)—images of monkeys or a leopard dancing for audiences of tigers—or Flood (1983), which showed a pair of tigers and a crane perched on rocks amid a torrential downpour, depict primal, mysterious dramas that critics of the time described as novel, challenging and visionary.

Melissa Miller, Farm, oil on canvas, 35" x 86", 2002.

By 1985, the looser, more Rubenesque animals of Miller's early work had given way to tighter, more realistic protagonists. These animals interacted with humanoids and mythological or fictional characters (angels, demons, spirits) in fantastical scenarios inspired by Eastern and Western folk tales (e.g., Aesop's Crow, 1985) that emphasized a psychological focus on inner states and existential dilemmas rather than external observation. Representative, allegorical works of this period include Broken Wing (1986), New Skin (1988), Decision (1991) and Night Sky (1995), which respectively depict mortal crisis, spontaneous metamorphosis, a phantasmagorical procession of creatures, and flight in the midst of environmental catastrophe.

Reacting to disappearing natural habitats and the increasing number of imported species that she observed in Texas and the Southwest, Miller shifted from fantastical and mythic scenes to tableaux combining farm and exotic animals in her paintings and drawings of the early 2000s. These paintings conveyed wary, almost-lazy calm and indifference and alluded to tenuous relationships among strangers, immigration, alienation, harmony and integration (e.g., Farm, 2002; Cluster, 2003). This work often employed rigorously structured, frieze-like compositions of flattened landscapes rather than illusionistic space, which reviewers compared to Japanese screens and Persian miniatures, Giorgio Morandi still lifes, and pre-Renaissance groupings of people.

Melissa Miller, Forest Fire, oil on canvas, 65" x 100", 2019.

Continuing to narrate from an observational position. Miller's later work has a more urgent ecological focus that portrays transitioning and despoiled land- and seascapes, shrinking wilderness habitats, displaced animal and human populations, and resulting, new patterns of behavior and migration. For example, Forest Fire (2019) depicts deer and birds fleeing a cataclysmic inferno; other works, such as Moth (2016) and Ghost Net (2013), show rare and other land species or sea life endangered by human activity. Reviewers suggest that in this later work, Miller's interest in Asian art is more evident, both in her experimentation with perspective and portrayal of animals, which is less anthropomorphic and metaphorical and more straight-forward. Since 2017, Miller has also created realistic, three-dimensional animal works in clay and silhouette-like, laser-cut metal landscape and animal works exploring similar themes.

== Collections and honors ==
Miller's work belongs to the public art collections of the Museum of Modern Art, National Museum of Women in the Arts, Albright–Knox Art Gallery, Museum of Fine Arts, Houston, Blanton Museum of Art, Dallas Museum of Art, Hirshhorn Museum, Modern Art Museum of Fort Worth, and Orlando Museum of Art, among others, as well as many private collections.

She has received awards from Anonymous Was a Woman (2003), the Texas Commission on the Arts (Texas Two-Dimensional Artist of the Year, 2011), Art League of Houston (Texas State Artist of the Year, 2008), Dallas Visual Arts Association (1999), and Dallas Museum of Art (1982), as well as three National Endowment for the Arts grants (1985, 1982, 1979).

== Monographs ==
- Kalil, Susie & Michael Duncan, Melissa Miller, University of Texas Press, 2007 ISBN 029271422X
- Miller, Melissa, A Bestiary by Melissa Miller, K2 Press, Austin, Texas, 2007.
- Miller, Melissa, Melissa Miller: Paintings, 1986-1995, Holly Solomon Gallery, New York, 1995
- Miller, Melissa, Melissa Miller: A survey, 1978-1986, Contemporary Arts Museum, Houston, 1986 ISBN 0936080175
