= Robert Zakanitch =

American painter

- Born: Robert Zakanitch; 1935 (age 90–91); Elizabeth, New Jersey
- Known for: Painter

Robert Rahway Zakanitch (born 1935) is an American painter and was one of the founders of the Pattern and Decoration movement. His work is held in the collection of the Philadelphia Museum of Art, Museum of Modern Art, Whitney Museum of American Art, among others.

== Personal life ==
Robert Zakanitch was born in 1935 in Elizabeth, New Jersey and grew up in Rahway. He lived and worked in New York City. At the time of his June 3 through September 17, 2017 exhibition in the Hudson River Museum, he had recently moved his residence and studio to Yonkers, New York (as stated in the exhibition's literature).

Robert Zakanitch, "Hanging Gardens Series (By The Sea)," 2011/2012, Gouache and colored pencil on paper, 96 x 60 inches © 2018 Robert Zakanitch,

== Career ==
In the late 1960s he began experimenting with Color Field painting but would go on to be one of the founders of the Pattern and Decoration movement in the mid 1970s. While working in the Color Field he was strict to adhering to an abstract style inspired by Minimalism until he learned about decorative imagery. He kept the same color schemes and structures, but incorporated floral motif and a more painterly style. Zakanitch was exhibiting in New York as early as 1968. In 1975 he met Miriam Schapiro while he served as a guest instructor at the University of California, San Diego. A year later, in New York, the two artists would organize an organization around Pattern & Decoration artists.
