= Tony Robbin =

American artist and author (born 1943)

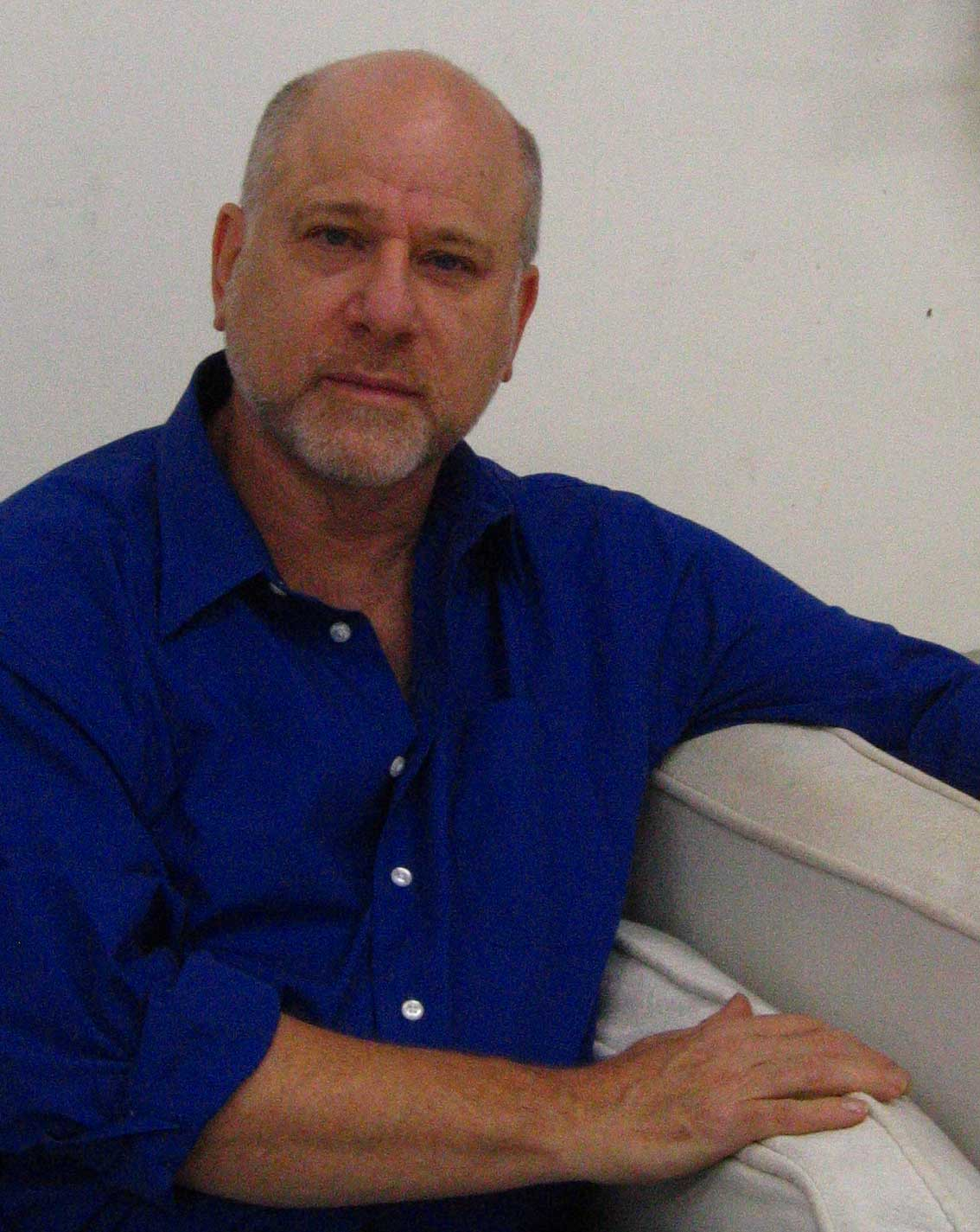
- Photo courtesy of Tony Robbin.
- Born: November 24, 1943 (age 82); Washington, D.C., United States
- Known for: Painting, Sculpture
- Movement: Pattern and Decoration
- Website: tonyrobbin.net

Painting 2005-7
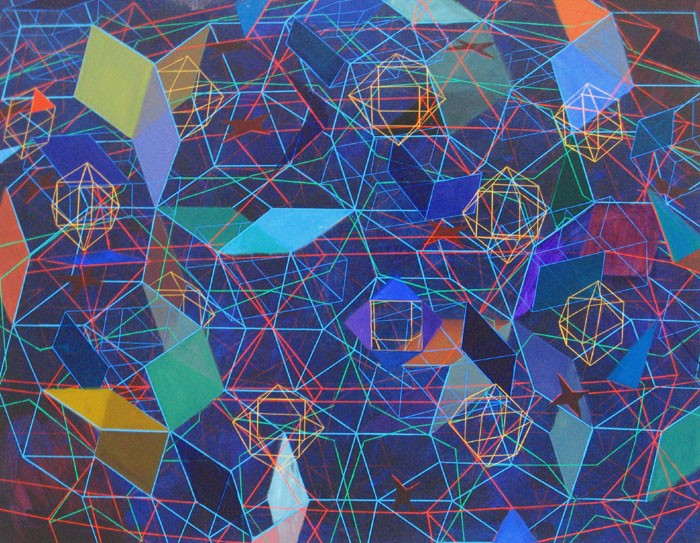
- Artist: Tony Robbin
- Year: 2005
- Medium: Acrylic on canvas
- Dimensions: 140 cm × 180 cm (56 in × 70 in)

Tony Robbin (born November 24, 1943, in Washington, DC) is an American artist and author, who works with painting, sculpture and computer visualizations. He is considered part of the Pattern and Decoration (P&D) art movement.

== Work ==
Robbin has had over 25 solo exhibitions of his painting and sculpture since his debut at the Whitney Museum of American Art in 1974, and has been included in over 100

Robbin was granted a patent for the application of quasicrystal geometry to architecture, (Note: Architectural body having a quasicrystal structure US Patent 5603188 A) and has implemented this geometry for a large-scale architectural sculpture at the Danish Technical University in Kongens Lyngby, Denmark, as well as one for the city of Jacksonville, Florida.

Robbin is the author of four books: Fourfield: Computers, Art, & the 4th Dimension (1992 ), Engineering A New Architecture, (1996), Shadows of Reality (2006) and Mood Swings A Painters Life (2011), an autobiography.

Robbin is a pioneer in the computer visualization of four-dimensional geometry. Since 1981, his realtime rotation programs of four-dimensional figures have been useful for obtaining an intuitive feel for four-dimensional space, and quasicrystal space. The original MS-DOS and Windows versions are available for free download from his website. An Android live-wallpaper hypercube, rotating in 4-space, is available for free at the Android market, or on his official website. (see external links below)

In 2011 the Orlando Museum of Art organized a retrospective of Robbin's paintings and drawings. The companion book Tony Robbin, A Retrospective is distributed by Hudson Hills Press.
