= Pattern and Decoration =

Art movement

Pattern and Decoration was a United States art movement from the mid-1970s to the early 1980s. The movement has sometimes been referred to as "P&D" or as The New Decorativeness. The movement was championed by the gallery owner Holly Solomon., and it was the subject of a retrospective exhibition at the Hudson River Museum in 2008.In 2019, the Museum of Contemporary Art, Los Angeles (MOCA) organized With Pleasure: Pattern and Decoration in American Art 1972–1985, a major scholarly survey of the movement. Curated by Anna Katz with assistant curator Rebecca Lowery, the exhibition featured approximately 50 artists and included painting, sculpture, collage, ceramics, textiles, and installation art. It examined the movement's embrace of ornamentation, decorative arts, and artistic traditions historically associated with women and domestic life. Participating artists included Miriam Schapiro, Joyce Kozloff, Valerie Jaudon, Robert Kushner, Kim MacConnel, and Mary Grigoriadis. The exhibition ran from October 27, 2019, to May 18, 2020.

== Background and influences ==
The Pattern and Decoration movement consisted of artists who had been involved with the abstract schools of art of the 1960s. The westernised, male dominated climate of artistic thought throughout Modernism had led to a marginalisation of what was considered non-Western and feminine. The P&D movement wanted to revive an interest in minor forms such as patterning, which at that point was equated with triviality. The prevailing negative view of decoration was one not generally shared by non-Western cultures.

The movement was influenced by sources outside of what was considered to be fine art. Blurring the line between art and design, many P&D works mimic patterns like those on wallpapers, printed fabrics, and quilts.

These artists also looked for inspiration outside of the United States. The influence of Islamic tile work from Spain and North Africa are visible in the geometric, floral patterns. They looked at Mexican, Roman, and Byzantine mosaics; Turkish embroidery, Japanese woodblocks; and Iranian and Indian carpets and miniatures.

== Development ==
Although the source materials have a nostalgic appeal, the treatment of these sources is modernist. Ben Johnson describes the paintings thus: "Pattern and Decoration did not distinguish between background and foreground, nor did it emphasize specific aspects of the composition. Rather, much as the abstract paintings of the time, it covered the canvas from edge to edge in an all-encompassing design. At the outset of the movement, Pattern and Decoration artists reacted against the severe lines and restrained compositions of minimalism. Yet, they often retained the same 'flattening grid' frequently employed by Minimalist painters." Pattern painters included Mary Grigoriadis, Arlene Slavin, and others who showed at a pivotal MOMA PS1 show in 1977.

== Beyond painting ==
Some work fitting into the P&D movement could be considered applied art. P&D artists worked in a variety of media beyond painting. One of Joyce Kozloff's major early works was an installation called "An Interior Decorated." It included ceramics, a hand-painted-tile floor, silkscreened wall hangings, and lithographs. The piece was installed in the Tibor de Nagy Gallery in New York.

In addition to his lush paintings and collages of flowers, Robert Kushner created ornate costumes that were used in performance events.

Many P&D created collages by decontextualizing and recombining disparate elements to form new meanings. Miriam Schapiro invented the term "femmage" to describe a combination of painting and sewing techniques. She embellished the painted canvas with traditionally female work such as embroidery, cross-stitch, and quilting.

Aside from physical assemblages, artists borrowed snippets from other cultures and sources; therefore collage was crucial to the movement's concept. Critics like Anne Swartz use this recombination of source materials as evidence that the Pattern and Decoration movement is an early example of postmodernism.

== Critical debate ==
The P&D artists enjoyed a period of critical and financial success; their works were much sought after and widely collected in both America and Europe. From the 1980s on, however, it was largely dismissed by critics. The reason for the backlash are multifarious and open to debate. NYT critic Holland Cotter offers the following explanation: "Art associated with feminism has always had a hostile press. And there was the beauty thing. In the neo-Expressionist, neo-Conceptualist late 1980s, no one knew what to make of hearts, Turkish flowers, wallpaper and arabesques."

In 2008 the Hudson River Art Museum in Yonkers, NY arranged a major exhibition entitled "Pattern and Decoration: An Ideal Vision in American Art, 1975-1985," which sought to reestablish its reputation as a serious movement. Curator Anne Swartz asserts that at the time audiences were uncomfortable with the unapologetic sensuality: "I suspect that until recently, a certain Puritanism surrounded the view of feminist art that prevented it from being seen as acceptable when it was sexually exciting and provocative. So when P&D art utilized some of the mechanisms of feminist art (provocation, pleasure, softness, etc) it challenged the intellectual systems that were supposed to be uppermost in the viewer's mind." There was a renaissance of interest and critical attention as result of the fresh scholarship. Cotter goes on to explain why the contemporary climate is more able to understand and appreciate the movement: "Thanks to multiculturalism and identity politics, we know better what to make of them now; the art world's horizons are immeasurably wider than they were two decades ago."

== Relation to the feminist art movement ==
There is a close connection between the Pattern and Decoration movement and the feminist art movement. The P&D movement arose in opposition to the Minimalist and Conceptualist movements, which valued austerity and demeaned ornamentation and craft.

In their widely anthologized 1978 essay "Art Hysterical Notions of Progress and Culture," P&D artists Joyce Kozloff and Valerie Jaudon explained how they thought sexist and racist assumptions underlaid Western art history discourse. They reasserted the value of ornamentation and aesthetic beauty - qualities assigned to the feminine sphere.

Floral imagery, patterning, and decoration are associated with the feminine. P&D artists included elements of crafts such as needlepoint and beading, which were traditionally done by women within the domestic sphere. By including these elements in their work, they dismantle the hierarchy of fine art over craft, and thereby raise questions about public (male) verses domestic (female) spaces, and fine art versus utilitarian objects.

However, critics argue about to what extent the P&D movement can be considered feminist. Although Kozloff and Jaudon were explicit about their feminist agenda, male artists Robert Kushner (artist) and Kim MacConnel sometimes avoided the label. They were more vocal about their aesthetic motivation for pursuing decoration. Writes Kushner: "For gallery and museum acceptance, if the art was industrial-looking, rectangular, and gray, black, or white, it was shown... Everything else (except color field painting, which today can be viewed as Technicolor minimalism) seemed to be marginalized. This simply did not fit many of our temperaments. Gray was boring. We wanted our art to be a lasting experience that took a great deal of time to decode fully."

Since these male artists both helped to define the P&D movement and were commercially successful, there is disagreement about P&D being called a woman's movement. On the other hand, Carissa DiGiovanni argues that male artists' distance from the feminist cause actually advanced it overall by taking feminine aesthetics and making them acceptable to the art establishment.

== Exhibitions ==
In addition to the 2008 retrospective mentioned above, in 2019 Anna Katz curated the museum exhibit With Pleasure: Pattern and Decoration in American Art 1972–1985 which ran at the Museum of Contemporary Art, Los Angeles from October 27, 2019 – May 18, 2020. Subsequently the exhibit traveled to Hessel Museum of Art, Bard College from June 26–November 28, 2021.

== Participating artists ==
- Cynthia Carlson
- Jennifer Cecere
- Jane Couch
- Brad Davis
- Merion Estes
- Tina Girouard
- Mary Grigoriadis
- Valerie Jaudon
- Jane Kaufman
- Joyce Kozloff
- Robert Kushner (artist)
- Thomas Lanigan-Schmidt
- Kim MacConnel
- Susan Michod
- Liz Whitney Quisgard
- Sonya Rapoport
- Tony Robbin
- Miriam Schapiro
- Barbara Schwartz
- Kendall Shaw
- Ned Smyth
- Betty Woodman
- George Woodman
- Robert Zakanitch
- Barbara Zucker
- Kaffe Fassett
