= Valerie Jaudon =

American painter (born 1945)

- Born: August 8, 1945 (age 80); Greenville, Mississippi, U.S.
- Education: Mississippi University for Women (1965); Memphis Academy of Art (1965); University of the Americas (1967)
- Alma mater: Central Saint Martins College of Arts and Design (1969)
- Movement: Postminimalism and Pattern and Decoration
- Spouse: Richard Kalina
- Website: valeriejaudon.com

Valerie Jaudon (born August 6, 1945) is an American painter commonly associated with various Postminimal practices – the Pattern and Decoration movement of the 1970s, site-specific public art, and new tendencies in abstraction.

== Life ==
Valerie Jaudon was born in Greenville, Mississippi and studied at Mississippi University for Women (1963–1965), Memphis Academy of Art (1965), University of the Americas in Mexico City (1966–1967), and Central Saint Martins College of Arts and Design in London (1968–1969).

== Work ==
Valerie Jaudon is an original member of the Pattern and Decoration movement. Her art has been written about consistently in books, journals, magazines, newspapers, and catalogs. She is the co-author, with Joyce Kozloff, of the widely anthologized Art Hysterical Notions of Progress and Culture (1978), in which she and Kozloff explained how they thought sexist and racist assumptions underlaid Western art history discourse. They reasserted the value of ornamentation and aesthetic beauty - qualities assigned to the feminine sphere.

In 2011 Jaudon was elected to the National Academy of Design.

Since 1987 Valerie Jaudon has taught at Hunter College of the City University of New York, where she is Professor of Art.

== Exhibitions ==
Jaudon has had numerous solo and group exhibitions nationally and internationally. She began her early career in New York with the group exhibition, "76 Jefferson Street," at the Museum of Modern Art in 1975, featuring artists who had lived and worked in the 1893 loft building near the East River and the Manhattan Bridge, an area on the Lower East Side which began to attract artists and musicians in the mid-1950s.

She was one of the original painters of the Pattern and Decoration movements of the 1970s. The group began exhibiting together in 1976 in "Ten Approaches to the Decorative" at the Alessandra Gallery in New York, followed by "Pattern Painting" in 1977 at PS1 in Long Island City, Queens. Subsequently, over fifty group exhibitions featuring the founding artists were held in museums and galleries in Europe and the U.S. including the National Gallery of Art in Washington, D.C., the Art Institute of Chicago, Palais des Beaux Arts, Brussels, Louisiana Museum of Modern Art in Humlebaeck, Denmark, the Neue Galerie, in Aachen, Germany, the Pori Art Museum, the Mayor Gallery in London, Modern Art Oxford, and the Hudson River Museum in Yonkers, New York.

In 2012 Jaudon was both included and involved with organizing a re-staging of the seminal group exhibition "Conceptual Abstraction", a survey of twenty contemporary abstract painters, at Hunter College Galleries curated by Joachim Pissarro and Pepe Karmel. The original exhibition, for which Jaudon was credited with coining the name "Conceptual Abstraction", took place in 1991 at the Sidney Janis Gallery.

Jaudon's first solo painting exhibition was at the Holly Solomon Gallery in New York in 1977 with further exhibitions in 1978, 1979 and 1981. The Sidney Janis Gallery represented her from 1982 until 1999 (until the gallery's closing), with solo exhibitions in 1983, 1985, 1986, 1988, 1990, 1993 and 1996. The Von Lintel Gallery in New York, now in Los Angeles, represented her starting in 2002, with solo exhibitions in 2003, 2005, 2008, 2010, 2012, and 2016. She is also currently represented in New York by DC Moore Gallery, with solo exhibitions in 2014, 2015, and 2020.

Other solo exhibitions include: Pennsylvania Academy of Fine Arts (1977); Galerie Bischofsberger, Zurich (1979); Hans Strelow Gallery, Düsseldorf (1980); Corcoran Gallery, Los Angeles (1981); Quadrat Museum, Bottrop, Germany (1983); Amerika Haus, Berlin (1983); McIntosh/Drysdale Gallery, Washington D.C. (1985); the Mississippi Museum of Art, Jackson] (1996); Stadel Museum, Frankfurt (1999); University of Mississippi Museum, Oxford (2011).

== Public art ==
Valerie Jaudon has completed fourteen major site-specific public art projects in a variety of media – painting, landscaping, mosaics, ceramic tile, welded steel, and cut stone.

Her first public project in 1977 was a ninety-foot-long ceiling mural in the INA Tower in Philadelphia, the Mitchell/Giurgola addition to the Insurance Company of North America building. The mural was executed during the period of her work with the architect Romaldo Giurgola. Jaudon was associated with the firm's New York and Philadelphia offices from 1975 until 1980, and worked on a wide range of projects.

In 1988 she completed Long Division, a sixty-foot-long welded steel fence, for the New York City Subway's 23rd Street station on the 4, 6, and <6> trains.

The Art Commission of the City of New York awarded Jaudon an Excellence in Design Award in 1988 for Reunion, a three-and-a-half acre paving plan with a 34' diameter granite floor mural at the 1 Police Plaza/Manhattan Municipal Building. This project was sponsored by the New York City Department of General Services, Percent for Art, and the Department of Cultural Affairs.

In 1993 Jaudon completed Blue Pools Courtyard, a site-specific installation with inlaid tile pools, plantings, and brick and bluestone pavers for the Charles W. Ireland Sculpture Garden at the Birmingham Museum of Art, and in 1994 received a merit award from the Alabama chapter of American Society of Landscape Architects. In 2010 the American Planning Association named the Charles W. Ireland Sculpture Garden as one of the Great Public Spaces in America.

Other public projects include Filippine Garden, 2004, a two-and-a-half acre garden with grass, gravel, and stone for the Thomas F. Eagleton Federal Courthouse in St. Louis, Missouri and a mosaic floor installation for Ronald Reagan Washington National Airport in Crystal City, Virginia, and the Metropolitan Washington Airports Authority.

== Selected honors and awards ==
- 1980 New York State Creative Artist Public Service Grant
- 1981 Mississippi Institute of Arts and Letters, Art Award
- 1987 National Endowment for the Arts, Visual Artists Fellowship
- 1987 Art Commission of the City of New York, Special Commendation for Police Plaza Art Work
- 1988 Art Commission of the City of New York, Award for Excellence in Design
- 1991 American Society of Landscape Architects, Alabama Chapter Merit Award for the Charles W. Ireland Memorial Sculpture Garden of the Birmingham Museum of Art
- 1992 New York Foundation for the Arts], Painting Fellowship
- 1997 Mississippi Institute of Arts and Letters, Art Award
- 1996 Women's City Club of New York, Civic Spirit Award
- 1999 Mississippi University for Women, Columbus, Distinguished Alumna Award
- 2002 Mississippi Committee of the National Museum of Women in the Arts Honored Artist Award
- 2002 Appointed to the National Register of Peer Professionals in the Design Excellence Program of the U.S. General Services Administration
- 2010 American Planning Association, the Charles Ireland Memorial Sculpture Garden of the Birmingham Museum of Art named as one of the "Great Public Spaces for 2010"
- 2011 Elected to the National Academy of Design
