= Kim MacConnel =

American artist (born 1946)

Kim MacConnel (born 1946 in Oklahoma City, Oklahoma) is an American artist who works with painting, sculpture, and mixed media-collage/fabric. MacConnel is a seminal figure in the Pattern and Decoration movement of the seventies, but overall MacConnel's oeuvre has surpassed being categorized. MacConnel received his BA, with honors, from the University of California, San Diego in 1969 and his MFA, also with honors, in 1972.

== Career ==
MacConnel had a lot of trouble starting out as an artist due to the fact that he had to come up against the minimalism of the time in the 1970s. During the Minimalist movement, artists weren't interested in color or even painting for the most part; MacConnel's art just wasn't accepted as serious. It also had partly to do with his material, instead of painting on stretched canvas, MacConnel instead painted on fabric and bed sheets, which he would tear apart and sew back together again. It wasn't until MacConnel was in an exhibition in (Germany) that his art became recognized.

"It wasn't really until a German collector who wrote a newsletter for German collectors saw the work in a show that I was in Germany and was overcome by it. He thought it was really brilliant for some reason. And that's when a contingent of Europeans really started looking at what we were trying to do. Particularly in my case, what I was trying to do. And found that it resonated in that area for them as a new avenue into the future, really, of what art making might be. So it was revolutionary in some ways in terms of, like, the status quo".

== Exhibitions ==
- Collection Applied Design in 1976 was MacConnel's first solo exhibition and was also his big break back in the states. A book, Collection Applied Design, which he had found in China Town a few years before, inspired the exhibition. This book was pages of clip art and logos put together randomly, in no certain order, and without an index, which inspired his series of works, "10 Items or Less" which he put into the show.
- Age of Plastic was his next big exhibition which he added more of the sculpture aspect of his work. He had been collecting beach items that had washed up on shore for two decades and finally decided how he wanted to utilize them. He used them into a series of works titled "Trashy Beach Clowns" where he used his found objects and transformed them into clown figures.
- Another well recognized series of works that is more recent is "Woman with Mirror" in 2007. In this series he went back to his original medium of painting with acrylics. Like Picasso had used African art as the subject of his work and added backgrounds of pattern, he would look at those backgrounds and take out the subject matter.
- Collection Applied Design, A Kim MacConnel Retrospective, which came out in 2010 and included the previous four decades of his work.

== Personal life ==
MacConnel is married to artist Jean Lowe and lives in Encinitas.
