= Robert Kushner =

American contemporary painter (born 1949)

- Born: 1949 (age 76–77); Pasadena, CA
- Education: University of California, San Diego
- Movement: Pattern and Decoration
- Website: https://www.robertkushnerstudio.com/

Robert Kushner (/ˈkʊʃnər/; born 1949, Pasadena, CA) is an American contemporary painter who is known especially for his involvement in Pattern and Decoration. He has been called "a founder" of that artistic movement. In addition to painting, Kushner creates installations in a variety of mediums, from large-scale public mosaics to delicate paintings on antique book pages.

== Work ==
Kushner draws from a unique range of influences, including Islamic and European textiles, Henri Matisse, Georgia O'Keeffe, Charles Demuth, Pierre Bonnard, Tawaraya Sotatsu, Ito Jakuchu, Qi Baishi, and Wu Changshuo. Kushner's work combines organic representational elements with abstracted geometric forms as a background in a way that is both decorative and modernist. He has said, “I never get tired of pursuing new ideas in the realm of ornamentation. Decoration, an abjectly pejorative dismissal for many, is a very big, somewhat defiant declaration for me. … The eye can wander, the mind think unencumbered through visual realms that are expansively and emotionally rich. Decoration has always had its own agenda, the sincere and unabashed offering of pleasure and solace."

Spring Scatter Summation (Detail), 2005 By Robert Kushner, Oil acrylic, gold leaf, and glitter on canvas 84 x 552 inches

Kushner's 2010 installation, Scriptorium: Devout Exercises of the Heart, is a group of over one thousand drawings of flowers and plants on book pages that date from 1500 to 1920. The pages have been removed from discarded and damaged books of all types from around the globe. Scriptorium was exhibited in Desire at The Blanton Museum of Art at the University of Texas at Austin. It then traveled to the Kunsthallen Brandts in Odense, Denmark before returning to the U.S. for the inaugural Chelsea exhibition at DC Moore Gallery in 2011. It was exhibited at the La Jolla Athenaeum in California in summer 2012.

== Murals ==
Kushner has created large-scale murals for public and private spaces. In 2004, he installed two monumental mosaic murals, 4 Seasons Seasoned, at the 77th Street and Lexington Avenue subway station. He has also completed commissions at Gramercy Tavern and Maialino restaurants in New York City, Union Square in Tokyo, The Ritz Carlton Highlands in Lake Tahoe, CA, and Federal Reserve System in Washington, DC. In 2010, an eighty-foot-long marble mosaic, Welcome, was installed at the new Raleigh Durham International Airport in North Carolina.

Two 2021 glass mosaics of his are displayed in Kalauao metro station on Oʻahu, Hawaiʻi.

== Exhibitions ==
Kushner's work has been exhibited extensively in the United States, Europe, and Japan and has been included in the Whitney Biennial three times and twice at the Venice Biennale in Italy. He was the subject of solo exhibitions at both the Whitney Museum of American Art and the Brooklyn Museum. A mid-career retrospective of his work was organized by the Philadelphia Institute of Contemporary Art.

Most recently, Kushner’s work has been included in several national and international museum exhibitions focusing on the Pattern and Decoration movement: With Pleasure: Pattern and Decoration in American Art 1972-1985, Museum of Contemporary Art, Los Angeles, CA (2019-2020); Less is a Bore: Maximalist Art & Design, Institute for Contemporary Art, Boston, MA (2019); Pattern and Decoration: Ornament as Promise, Ludwig Forum, Aachen, Germany, Museum Moderner Kunst Stiftung, Vienna, Austria, and Ludwig Museum, Budapest, Hungary (2018-2019); Pattern, Decoration & Crime, MAMCO, Geneva, Switzerland, and Le Consortium, Dijon, France (2019).

== Other work ==
In his early career, Kushner participated in solo and group performance art. Many of these performances featured costumes that Kushner created with craft techniques such as sewing and embroidery. His first performance, entitled Costumes for Moving Bodies, occurred in 1971 during the artist's senior exhibition at the University of California San Diego. The following year, Kushner began incorporating food into his clothing-based performances. Kushner created two performances in 1972 that featured food costumes. The first, Costumes Constructed and Eaten, was presented at the Jack Glenn Gallery in Corona del Mar, California, and the second, Robert Kushner and Friends Eat Their Clothes, in New York. Both of these performances ended with the audience eating the garments. According to the artist, the primary artistic elements of such food performances would be the “ephemeral composition of all the costumes together, the observation of their disintegration through the act of eating, and the lingering sense of gustatory titillation.”

He has also published scholarly articles in a variety of publications. Most recently, he edited the publication Amy Goldin: Art in a Hairshirt (2011), a compilation of the art critic Goldin's essays.

He was interviewed for the film !Women Art Revolution.

== Selected bibliography ==
A monograph on Kushner's three decades of artistic work, Gardens of Earthly Delight, was published by Hudson Hills Press in 1997. Wild Gardens, a selection of Kushner's recent paintings with an essay by Michael Duncan, was published by Pomegranate in 2006.

- Anderson-Spivy, Alexandra. “Robert Kushner: Gardens of Earthly Delight,” New York: Hudson Hills Press, 1997.
- Robert Kushner: Silk Road, essay by Justin Spring (DC Moore Gallery, 2008).
- Robert Kushner, On Location, interview by Peter Eleey (DC Moore Gallery, 2007).
- Robert Kushner: Wild Gardens, Pomegranate, 2006, essay by Michael Duncan.
- Robert Kushner: Opening Doors, introduction by Bridget Moore, essay by Robert Kushner (DC Moore Gallery, 2004).
- Robert Kushner: Hot!! Essay by Howard Rogers (DC Moore Gallery, 2001).
- Robert Kushner: The Language of Flowers, essay by Donald Kuspit, foreword by Bridget Moore (DC Moore Gallery, 1998).
- Robert Kushner: The Language of Flowers, 1998 (exhibition catalogue)
- Robert Kushner: Hot!!, 2001 (exhibition catalogue)
- Robert Kushner: Opening Doors, 2004 (exhibition catalogue)
- Robert Kushner: On Location, 2007 (exhibition catalogue)
- Robert Kushner: Silk Road, 2009 (exhibition catalogue)
- Robert Kushner: New Paintings / New Collages, 2012 (exhibition catalogue)

== Public collections ==
Kushner's work is represented in numerous important public collections worldwide, including:

- Albright-Knox Art Gallery, Buffalo, NY
- Art Collection of the United States Embassy, Panama
- Australian National Gallery, Canberra, Australia
- The Baltimore Museum of Art, Baltimore, MD
- Bowdoin College Museum of Art, Brunswick, ME
- The Brooklyn Museum of Art, Brooklyn, NY
- California Palace of the Legion of Honor, San Francisco, CA
- Carnegie Museum of Art, Pittsburgh, PA
- The Columbus Museum of Art, Columbus, OH
- The Contemporary Museum, Honolulu, HI
- The Corcoran Gallery of Art, Washington, DC
- The Denver Art Museum, Denver, CO
- Galleria degli Ufizzi, Florence, Italy
- Gröninger Museum, Gröningen, the Netherlands
- Honolulu Academy of Arts, Honolulu, HI
- J.B. Speed Museum, Louisville, KY
- J. Paul Getty Trust, Los Angeles, CA
- Library of Congress, Washington, D.C.
- Los Angeles County Museum of Art, Los Angeles, CA
- The Metropolitan Museum of Art, New York, NY
- Milwaukee Art Museum, Milwaukee, WI
- The Minneapolis Institute of Arts, Minneapolis, MN
- Museum Ludwig, Cologne, Germany
- Museum Ludwig, St. Petersburg, Russia
- Museum Moderner Kunst - Palais Lichtenstein, Vienna, Austria
- The Museum of Modern Art, New York, NY
- The National Gallery of Art, Washington, D.C.
- Nelson Atkins Museum of Art, Kansas City, MO
- Neue-Galerie-Sammlung Ludwig, Aachen, Germany
- The Oakland Museum, Oakland, CA
- Orlando Museum of Art, Florida
- Philadelphia Museum of Art, Philadelphia, PA
- Rockefeller Center, New York, NY
- San Francisco Museum of Modern Art, San Francisco, CA
- Sarah Moody Gallery of Art, University of Alabama, Tuscaloosa, AL
- State of Hawaii
- St. Louis Art Museum, St. Louis, MO
- Peter Stuyvesant Foundation, Amsterdam, Holland
- The Tate Gallery, London, England
- Whitney Museum of American Art, New York, NY
- Wichita Art Museum, Wichita, KS

== Notable solo exhibitions ==
2021

- “Robert Kushner: I Heart Matisse,” DC Moore Gallery, New York, NY, May 6 – June 12, 2021

2019

- “Robert Kushner: By My Window,” DC Moore Gallery, New York, NY, October 10 – November 9, 2019

2018

- “Robert Kushner: Reverie: Dupatta-topia,” Texas Gallery, Houston, TX, November 29, 2018 – January 5, 2019
- “Robert Kushner: Reverie: Dupatta-topia,” DC Moore Gallery, New York, NY, May 3 – June 16, 2018
- “A Mist of Unknowing,” 8 / ART GALLERY / Tomio Koyama Gallery: Tokyo, Japan, April 4 – 30, 2018
- “Tracery and Plane: Paintings by Robert Kushner,” Sarah Moody Gallery of Art, The University of Alabama, Tuscaloosa, AL, February 8 – March 23, 2018

2017

- “Robert Kushner: Portraits & Perennials,” DC Moore Gallery, New York, NY, February 9 – March 11, 2017
- Robert Kushner at 375 Hudson Street / Saatchi & Saatchi Building, New York, NY, November 28, 2017 – May, 2018

2016

- “Robert Kushner,” Jerald Melberg Gallery, Charlotte, NC, March 11 – April 23, 2016

2015

- Galleri DGV, Svendborg, Denmark
- “Tenderness and Thorns,” Hakusasonso Hashimoto Museum, Kyoto, Japan, September 9 – 27, 2015
- “Robert Kushner: Pleasure and Solace,” Eleanor D. Wilson Museum, Hollins University, Roanoke, VA, June 16 – September 12, 2015
- “Robert Kushner: baroque,” DC Moore Gallery, New York, NY, January 8- February 14, 2015
- “Robert Kushner: Paintings & Collages,” Texas Gallery, Houston, TX, May 14 – June 20, 2015
- “Robert Kushner: Patois,” Off Ramp Gallery, Pasadena, CA, April 12 – May 17, 2015

2014

- “Robert Kushner: Treasures, Souvenirs, Memories – New Collages,” October 1 – 25, Yoshiaki Inoue Gallery, Osaka, Japan
- “Robert Kushner: Paintings 2010-2013 & The Four Seasons,” January 10 – April 12, 2014, Carl Solway Gallery, Cincinnati, OH

2012

- “Robert Kushner: New Paintings/New Collages,” November 8 – December 21, 2012, DC Moore Gallery, New York, NY
- “Robert Kushner: New Work,” September 7 – October 6, 2012, Perimeter Gallery, Chicago, IL
- “Robert Kushner's Scriptorium: Devout Exercises of the Heart,” June 23 – July 28, Joseph Clayes III Gallery, La Jolla Athenaeum, La Jolla, CA
- “Robert Kushner: Wildflowers / Garden Flowers,” June 30 – August 4, Bellas Artes, Santa Fe, NM

2011

- "Robert Kushner: Wildflower Convocation," February 3 - March 12, DC Moore Gallery, New York, NY
- “Robert Kushner, Flora Dreams: Paintings and Works on Paper,” February 26 – April 9, Jerald Melberg Gallery, Charlotte, NC
- “Robert Kushner: 30 Literary Nudes,” April 16 – May 28, 2011, Luis De Jesus, Santa Monica, CA

2009

- “Robert Kushner: Paintings and Works on Paper,” van Straaten Gallery, Denver, CO
- “Robert Kushner: Caravansarai,” Bellas Artes, Santa Fe, NM
- “Robert Kushner,” Federal Reserve System, Washington, DC
- “Robert Kushner: Silk Road,” DC Moore Gallery, New York, NY
- “Robert Kushner: New Work,” Perimeter Gallery, Chicago, IL

2007

- “Robert Kushner,” Federal Reserve System, Washington, DC
- "Robert Kushner: On Location," DC Moore Gallery, New York, NY

2006

- “Robert Kushner: Winter Bouquets,” Sandy Carson Gallery, Denver, CO
- “Robert Kushner: Red Series,” Yoshiaki Inoue Gallery, Osaka, Japan

2005

- “Robert Kushner,” Gallery Camino Real, Boca Raton, FL
- “Robert Kushner,” Wistariahurst Museum, Holyoke, MA

2004

- “Robert Kushner: Opening Doors,” DC Moore Gallery, New York, NY
- Gallery Camino Real, Boca Raton, FL
- Perimeter Gallery, Chicago, IL
- “Robert Kushner: New BYOBU Paintings,” Takada Gallery, San Francisco, CA
- Yoshiaki Inoue Gallery, Osaka, Japan

2003

- “Robert Kushner - Sliding Doors: Homage to John Cage,” DC Moore Gallery, New York, NY
- Yoshiaki Inoue Gallery, Osaka, Japan
- Gallery Orie, Tokyo, Japan
- Perimeter Gallery, Chicago, IL

2002

- “Kakishibu + Gold,” Bellas Artes, Santa Fe, NM
- Takada Gallery, San Francisco, CA

2001

- Oxy Gallery, Osaka, Japan
- “Hot!!,” DC Moore Gallery, New York, NY
- The Contemporary Museum, Honolulu, Hawaii

2000

- “Robert Kushner Prints & Drawings,” Yoshiaki Inoue Gallery, Osaka, Japan
- “Florid,” Michael Lord Gallery, Milwaukee, WI
- “New Work,” Lizan Tops Gallery, East Hampton, NY

1999

- “Robert Kushner: Silk Leaves/Paper Flowers,” Bellas Artes, Santa Fe, NM
- “Robert Kushner,” Gallery APA, Nagoya, Japan
- “Robert Kushner,” Lizan Tops Gallery, East Hampton, NY

1998

- “Robert Kushner: New Works on Japanese Paper,” Hiromi Paper International, Inc., Bergamot Station Art Complex, Santa Monica, CA
- “Robert Kushner: The Language of Flowers,” DC Moore Gallery, New York, NY
- “Robert Kushner,” Parchman Stremmel Galleries, San Antonio, TX
- “Robert Kushner: 25 Years of Making Art,” New Jersey Center For Visual Arts, Summit, NJ

1997

- “Robert Kushner: Pomona and Flora,” DC Moore Gallery, New York, NY
- “The Iris Series: Works on Paper,” Gallery One, Toronto, Canada
- “Mesas and Vistas,” Bellas Artes, Santa Fe, NM
- “A Prayer for Peace: Robert Kushner and Hiroshi Senju,” Hiroshima Prefectural Museum, Japan
- Tenmaya Department Store, Hiroshima. Traveled to: Tenmaya Department stores in Okayama and Fukuyama, Japan
- “The Pleasure of it All: Robert Kushner’s Flower Paintings,” Indianapolis Museum of Art, Indianapolis, IN
- Yoshiaki Inoue Gallery, Osaka, Japan
- Gallery Shiraishi, Tokyo, Japan

1996

- Elliot Smith Fine Art, St. Louis, MO
- “Celestial Banquet,” The Fabric Workshop and Museum, Philadelphia, PA

1995

- “Mille Fleurs: A Cornucopia of New Paintings,” Midtown Payson Galleries, New York, NY
- “Robert Kushner Paintings and Monoprints,” Barbara Scott Gallery, Miami Beach, FL
- “Robert Kushner: Paintings and Drawings,” Parchman Stremmel Galleries, San Antonio, TX

1994

- “Robert Kushner: Works on Paper,” Nina Freudenheim Gallery, Buffalo, NY
- “Robert Kushner: Works on Paper,” Gallery APA, Nagoya, Japan
- “Robert Kushner: New Etchings,” Crown Point Press, San Francisco, CA
- “Neo Rimpa: Robert Kushner & Hiroshi Senju,” Gallery Inoue & Yoshiaki Inoue Gallery, Osaka, Japan
- “Pele’s Garden: Recent Monoprints,” Quartet Editions, New York, NY
- Gallerie OZ, Paris, France
- Blancpain/Stepczynski Galerie, Geneva, Switzerland

1993

- “Robert Kushner, Japanese Ceramics,” Yoshiaki Inoue Gallery, Osaka, Japan.
- “Robert Kushner,” Holly Solomon Gallery, New York, NY
- “Forcing the Spring,” Floria/Brown Gallery, Woody Creek, CO
- “Seasons,” Montclair Art Museum, Montclair, NJ

1992

- Timothy Brown Fine Art, Aspen, CO
- Kunsthallen Brandts Klaedefabrik, Odense, Denmark
- Yoshiaki Inoue Gallery, Osaka, Japan
- “Four Seasons,” Midtown Payson Galleries, New York, NY

1991

- “Perennial Diary,” Holly Solomon Gallery, New York, NY
- “Seasonal Furbelows: A One Year Installation,” The American Craft Museum, New York, NY
- “Leaves,” First Gallery, Moscow, Russia

1990

- Gloria Luria Gallery, Bay Harbor Islands, FL
- Michael Lord Gallery, Milwaukee, WI
- “Opulent Subversions,” Holly Solomon Gallery, New York, NY
- Gallery Basque, Fukuoka, Japan. Traveled through 1991 to: American Cultural Centers in Tokyo, Sapporo, Osaka, and Nagoya, Japan
- “Black and White Prints,” Crown Point Press, New York, NY

1989

- Aspen Art Museum, Aspen, CO
- Holly Solomon Gallery, New York, NY
- “Silent Operas,” Staller Center for the Arts, SUNY, Stony Brook, NY

1988

- “Robert Kushner: Paintings and Sculpture,” Iannetti-Lanzone Gallery, San Francisco, CA
- Michael Lord Gallery, Milwaukee, WI
- D. & J. Bittker Gallery, Birmingham, MI
- J.B. Speed Art Museum, Louisville, KY

1987

- “Robert Kushner: New Bronze Sculpture,” Holly Solomon Gallery, New York, NY
- Fay Gold Gallery, Atlanta, GA
- Institute of Contemporary Art, University of Pennsylvania, Philadelphia, PA

1986

- Rugg Road, Boston, MA
- Galerie Rudolf Zwirner, Cologne, Germany

1985

- Holly Solomon Gallery, New York, NY
- Galleria Capricorni, Venice, Italy
- Mayor Gallery, London, England
- Crown Point Press, New York, NY

1984

- McIntosh/Drysdale Gallery, Houston, TX
- “Robert Kushner: Mixed Media on Fabric and Paper,” Brentwood Gallery, St. Louis, MO
- Galleria Giulia, Rome, Italy
- “Grand Lobby Installation,” The Brooklyn Museum, Brooklyn, NY
- “Paintings on Paper,” The Whitney Museum of American Art, New York, NY

1983

- Dart Gallery, Chicago, IL
- Holly Solomon Gallery, New York, NY

1982

- “Domestic Exotica,” Holly Solomon Gallery, New York, NY
- Gallery Rudolf Zwirner, Cologne, Germany
- University of Colorado Art Gallery, Boulder, CO
- “Grafiek,” American Graffiti Gallery, Amsterdam, the Netherlands
- “Souvenirs,” Studio Marconi, Milan, Italy
- “Robert Kushner at USC,” The Helen Lindhurst Gallery, University of Southern California, Los Angeles, CA
- Castelli-Goodman-Solomon, East Hampton, NY

1981

- “New Works,” The Mayor Gallery, London, England
- Galerie Bischofberger, Zurich, Switzerland
- “New Robert Kushner Work,” Brainerd Art Gallery, State University of New York at Potsdam. Traveled to: Danforth Museum, Framingham, MA
- “Some Recent Acquaintances,” Holly Solomon Gallery, New York, NY
- “Dreams and Visions,” Holly Solomon Gallery, New York, NY
- Asher/Faure Gallery, Los Angeles, CA
- Akira Ikeda Gallery, Nagoya, Japan
- Barbara Gladstone Editions, New York, NY
- “The Cupid Prints,” Holly Solomon Editions, New York, NY

1980

- Dart Gallery, Chicago, IL

1979

- “The Dance, The Kiss,” Daniel Templon Gallery, Paris, France
- Holly Solomon Gallery, New York, NY

1978

- “Mere Decoration,” Lunn Gallery/Graphics International, LTD, Washington, D.C.
- The Mayor Gallery, London, England

1977

- Thorpe Intermedia Gallery, Sparkill, NY
- “One Size Fits All,” Philadelphia College of Art, Philadelphia, PA
- “Paper and Cloth,” Holly Solomon Gallery, New York, NY

1976

- “Persian Line Part II,” Holly Solomon Gallery, New York, NY

1975

- “The Persian Line,” The Kitchen, New York, NY
- “Recent Works,” Rasdall Gallery, University of Kentucky at Lexington, KY
- “Tie and Pie Boutique,” Holly Solomon Gallery, New York, NY

1971

- “Costumes for Moving Bodies,” Art Gallery, University of California at San Diego, La Jolla, CA
