= Pitts =

Pitts is a surname. Notable people with the surname include:

== People ==
=== Uncategorized ===
- Chandra Pitts, American nonprofit executive
- Curtis Pitts (1915–2005), American designer of the Pitts Special series of aerobatic biplanes
- Earl Edwin Pitts (born 1953), American former FBI agent convicted of espionage for selling information to Soviet and Russian intelligence services
- Jennifer Pitts, Miss Virginia 2005
- Milton Pitts (1912–1994), White House barber for four presidents
- Shirley Pitts (1934–1992), English fraudster and thief, the "Queen of shoplifters"

=== Clergy and religious figures ===
- Eve Pitts, British Anglican minister, first black woman to be ordained as an Anglican vicar
- Fountain E. Pitts (1808-1874), American Methodist minister and Confederate chaplain

=== Civil rights and political activists ===
- Charles Pitts (broadcaster) (1941–2015), American gay activist and radio personality
- Chip Pitts (born 1960), American human rights activist and attorney
- Helen Pitts Douglass (1838–1903), American suffragette and the second wife of Frederick Douglass
- Viola Pitts (1914–2004), American community and political activist from Fort Worth

=== Educators, scientists, and educational leaders ===
- Derrick Pitts (born 1955), American astronomer and science communicator
- Jesse R. Pitts (1921–2003), American sociologist
- Lucius Holsey Pitts (1915–1974), American college president and Black educational leader
- Victoria Pitts-Taylor, American sociologist
- Walter Pitts (1923–1969), American logician

=== Fine arts ===
- Lillian Louisa Pitts (1872–1947), Australian photographer
- William Pitts II (1790–1840), English silver-chaser and sculptor

=== Journalists, writers ===
- Byron Pitts (born 1960), American journalist and author, co-host of the news program Nightline and a chief national correspondent for The CBS Evening News
- Denis Pitts (1930–1994), English journalist
- Leonard Pitts (born 1957), American journalist and Pulitzer Prize winner
- Priscilla Pitts, New Zealand 20th and 21st century writer and art curator
- Pitts Sanborn (né John Pitts Sanborn; 1879–1941), music critic for various New York City newspapers

=== Military ===
- Riley L. Pitts (1937–1967), United States Army captain, first African American officer to be awarded the Medal of Honor
- Ryan M. Pitts (born 1985), former United States Army soldier and Medal of Honor recipient

=== Performing arts: music, theater, film, TV (including composers, writers, directors, producers) ===
- Antony Pitts (born 1969), British composer
- Charles Pitts (1947–2012), American soul/blues guitarist
- Jacob Pitts (born 1979), American actor
- Jake Pitts (born 1985), American lead guitarist of the rock band Black Veil Brides
- Juanita Pitts, African-American tap dancer in the 1930s and '40s
- Karnail "Bugz" Pitts, American rapper
- Mark Pitts (born 1970), American record executive, talent manager and President of RCA Records since 2021
- Matthew Pitts (fl. 2008–present), American television writer
- Rafi Pitts (born 1967), Iranian film director
- Rob Pitts (1979–2024), American businessman, television personality and classic car enthusiast
- Tony Pitts (born 1962), English actor
- Trudy Pitts (1932–2010), American soul jazz keyboardist
- Valerie Pitts (1937–2021), British television presenter during the 1950s
- Victória Pitts (born 1991), Brazilian mezzo-soprano opera singer
- William S. Pitts (1830–1918), American physician and composer
- ZaSu Pitts (1894–1963), American actress

=== Politicians and public servants ===
- Benjamin T. Pitts (died 1964), American politician and businessman
- Bernard Q. Pitts (fl. 1993–1998), Belizean politician and lawyer
- Edmund L. Pitts (1839–1898), American politician and lawyer
- Joe Pitts (Pennsylvania politician) (born 1939), American former politician
- P. Casey Pitts (born 1980), American lawyer and United States district judge
- Robert B. Pitts (1909–1982), first black Regional Administrator of the United States Department of Housing and Urban Development

=== Sports (including journalists) ===
- Alabama Pitts (1909–1941), American baseball player and convicted robber
- Allen Pitts (born 1964), American former Canadian Football League player
- Boozer Pitts (1893–1971), American college football player and coach
- Chester Pitts (born 1979), American former National Football League player
- Derrek Pitts (born 1998), American football player
- Elijah Pitts (1938–1998), American National Football League player and assistant coach
- Ernie Pitts (1935–1970), Canadian football player, member of the Canadian Football League Hall of Fame
- Frank Pitts (born 1943), American football player in the American and National Football Leagues
- Gaylen Pitts (1946–2024), American Major League Baseball player and minor league baseball coach and manager
- Harry Pitts (1915–1998), English footballer
- Jay Pitts (born 1989), English rugby league footballer
- Justin Pitts (born 1994), American basketball player
- Kyle Pitts (born 2000), American football player
- Lafayette Pitts (born 1992), American former football player
- Matthew Pitts (footballer) (born 1979), English footballer
- R. C. Pitts (1919–2011), American basketball player
- Ron Pitts (born 1962), American sportscaster and former National Football League player
- Thyrick Pitts (born 1999), American football player

=== Further disambiguations ===
- George Pitts (disambiguation)
- James Pitts (disambiguation)
- John Pitts (disambiguation)
- Mike or Michael Pitts (disambiguation)

== Fictional characters ==
- Earl Pitts (character), a radio character created and voiced by Gary Burbank

== See also ==
- Pit (disambiguation)
- Pitt (disambiguation)
