= Pit =

Pit or PIT may refer to:

== Structure ==
- Ball pit, a recreation structure
- Casino pit, the part of a casino which holds gaming tables
- Trapping pit, pits used for hunting
- Pit (motor racing), an area of a racetrack where pit stops are conducted
- Trading pit, a part of a trading floor where open outcry takes place
- Pit cave, a natural cave containing a vertical shaft
- Mine (mining)
  - Open-pit mine, surface extraction of rock or minerals
  - Coal mine or pit

== Science and technology ==
- Pit, an excavation on metallic surface caused by pitting corrosion
- Pit, one of many indentations used to store data on a compact disc
- Pit (botany), a part of plant cell walls which allows the exchange of fluids
- Pit (nuclear weapon), the core of an implosion weapon
- Pit bull, a breed of dog
- PIT tag, Passive Integrated Transponder for RFID system
- Powered industrial truck, a US legal term
- Point in time, time and date something took place
- Probability integral transform, a theorem in probability and statistics
- Programmable interval timer, a computing device
- Pulsed inductive thruster, a device used in spacecraft propulsion
- Pyrena or pit, the hard seed-bearing kernel inside drupe fruits such as peaches, olives and cherries
- Boolean prime ideal theorem, which guarantees the existence of certain types of subsets in a given abstract algebra
- Polynomial identity testing, the problem of efficiently determining whether two multivariate polynomials are identical.
- 2-Propanoyl-3-(4-isopropylphenyl)-tropane, a cocaine analog
- As a file extension, .pit stands for Partition Information Table

== Arts and entertainment ==
=== Games ===
- Pit (game), a Parker Brothers card game simulating a commodities exchange
- Pit (Kid Icarus), the main character in the video game series Kid Icarus

=== Music ===
- Front ensemble, the stationary percussion section in a marching band or drum corps
- Mosh pit, an area for dancing at a concert
- Orchestra pit, the area in a theater, between the stage and audience, in which musicians perform

== People ==
- Pit Martin (1943–2008), Canadian National Hockey League player
- Pit Seng Low (born 1995), Australian badminton player
- Pit Schubert (1935–2024), German author and mountain climber
- Pit Schlechter (born 1990), Luxembourgish cyclist
- Pit Passarell (1968–2024), Brazilian heavy metal and rock musician
- Alfred Lépine (1901–1955), Canadian ice hockey player and coach
- Pit Leyder (born 1997), Luxembourgish cyclist
- Pit Kroke (1936–2016), German architect and artist
- Pit Gilman (1864–1950), American baseball player
- Pit Corder (1918–1990), English linguist
- Pit Brandenburger (born 1995), Luxembourgish swimmer
- Pit Beirer (born 1972), German motocross racer and team manager

== Places ==
=== United States ===
- Pit River, a watershed in California
- Peoples Improv Theater, a venue in New York City
- Pittsburgh (abbreviation), a city in Pennsylvania
- Pittsburgh International Airport (IATA code)

== Sports ==
An abbreviation for Pittsburgh sports teams, such as:

- Pittsburgh Steelers, a football team in the NFL
- Pittsburgh Pirates, a baseball team in MLB
- Pittsburgh Penguins, a hockey team in the NHL
- Pittsburgh Condors, a former basketball team in the NBA

== Transport ==
- Palitana railway station, Gujarat, India, Indian Railways station code PIT

== Other uses ==
- Party of Independence and Labour (French: Parti de l'Indépendance et du Travail), a Senegalese political party
- Ivorian Workers' Party (French: Parti ivoirien des travailleurs), an Ivorian political party
- PIT maneuver, a ramming tactic used by law enforcement in vehicle pursuits
- Bie (surname), Chinese surname also romanized as Pit
- Pit organ, an organ present in snakes used to sense infrared light

== See also ==
- The Pit (disambiguation)
- Pitt (disambiguation)
- Pitts (disambiguation)
- PITS (disambiguation)
- Bolshoy Pit, a tributary of the Yenisei, Russia
- Pituitary-specific positive transcription factor 1 (PIT-1), a gene
- Bottomless pit (disambiguation)
- Cockpit
- Hole (disambiguation)
- Fossa (disambiguation), (Latin for pit)
