= Pitt (surname) =

Pitt is a surname of English origin.

== List of people with the surname Pitt ==
Used as a surname, Pitt most commonly refers to the following people:

- Brad Pitt (born 1963), American actor
- Members of the Pitt family, particularly William Pitt the Elder, Prime Minister of Great Britain (1766–1768) and William Pitt the Younger, Prime Minister of Great Britain (1783–1801) and of the United Kingdom (1801 and 1804–1806)

Pitt may also refer to the following people:

- Andrew Pitt (born 1976), motorcycle racer from New South Wales, Australia
- Angela Pitt (born 1981), Canadian provincial politician from Alberta
- Benjamin Pitt, Tobago politician
- Bernard Pitt (1882–1916), British teacher, poet and army officer
- Christopher Pitt (1699–1748), English poet and translator
- Courtney Pitt (born 1981), English footballer
- Daniel Pitt (born 2006), Welsh boxer
- David Pitt, Baron Pitt of Hampstead (1913–1994), civil rights campaigner and Labour politician in the United Kingdom
- Emma Pitt (1846-1919), American hymn author and composer
- George Pitt (disambiguation), several people
- Harvey Pitt (1945–2023), former chairman of the U.S. Securities and Exchange Commission (SEC)
- Ingrid Pitt (1937–2010), Polish actress in horror films of the 1960s and 70s
- John Pitt (disambiguation), several people
- Kalanimoku (1768–1827), prominent Hawaiian official given the name William Pitt by visiting Europeans
- Malcolm Pitt (1897–1985), American college sports coach
- Michael Pitt (civil servant) (born 1949), British civil servant
- Michael Pitt (born 1981), American actor
- Redding Pitt (1944–2016), attorney and chairman of the Alabama Democratic Party
- Susan Pitt (1948–2024), American competition swimmer
- Thomas Pitt (1653–1726), English merchant, grandfather of Pitt the Elder
- Thomas Pitt, 1st Baron Camelford (1737–1793), elder brother of Pitt the Elder
- Thomas Pitt, 2nd Baron Camelford (1775–1804), son of the 1st Baron Camelford
- Turia Pitt (born 1987), Australian mining engineer, athlete, motivational speaker, and author
- Valerie Pitt (1925–1999), British academic and Church of England campaigner
- Warren Pitt (1948–2025), Australian politician
- William Pitt (architect) (1855–1918), architect working in Melbourne, Australia
- William Pitt (engineer) (1840–1909), of New Brunswick, Canada, inventor of the underwater cable ferry in the early 1900s
- William Fox-Pitt (born 1969), British three-day eventing rider
- Bill Pitt (politician) (1937–2017), British politician; Liberal Member of Parliament, 1981–1983
- William Rivers Pitt (born 1971), American author and essayist

== See also ==
- Pitts
