= Bottomless =

Bottomless means having no bottom or lower limit. It may also refer to:

- Bottomless beverage, a drink with unlimited refills
- Nudity beneath the waist

== See also ==
- Bottom (disambiguation)
- Bottomless pit (disambiguation)
- Topless (disambiguation)
