= John Pitts =

John Pitts may refer to:

- John Pitts (American football) (born 1945), American former American and National Football League defensive back
- John Pitts (Catholic scholar) (1560–1616), English Catholic
- John Pitts (composer) (born 1976), British composer
- John Pitts (merchant) (1688–?), Massachusetts merchant, who was born in England
- John E. Pitts Jr. (1924–1977), United States Air Force brigadier general
- John Drayton Pitts (1798–1861), American politician and businessman
- John W. Pitts, American inventor of the 1928 Pitts Sky Car
- Pitts Sanborn (né John Pitts Sanborn; 1879–1941), music critic for various New York City newspapers
- Johny Pitts, English television presenter, writer and photographer

== See also ==
- John Pitt (disambiguation)
