= Jeannette, Pennsylvania =

City in Pennsylvania, US

- City
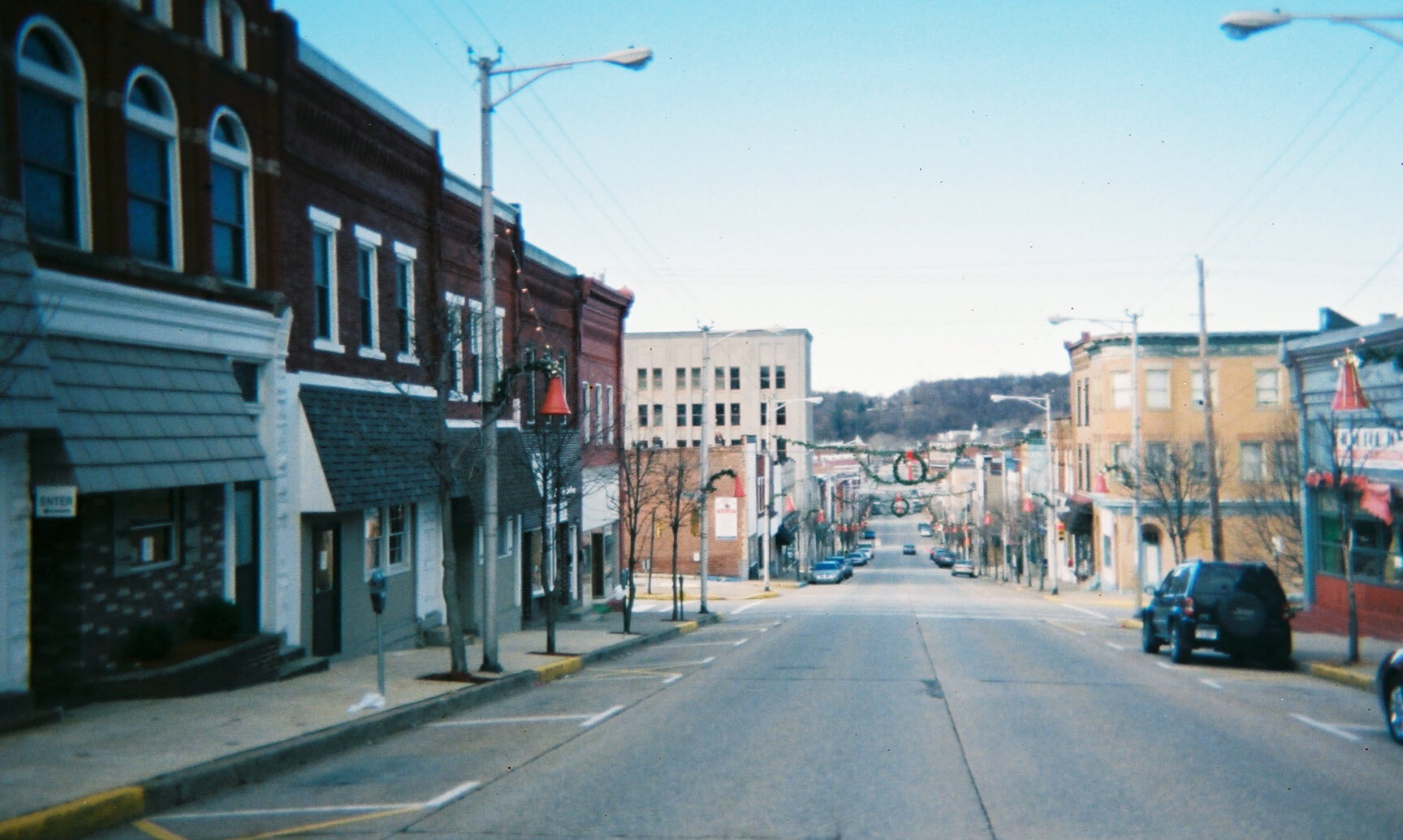
- Jeannette's Business District (Clay Avenue)

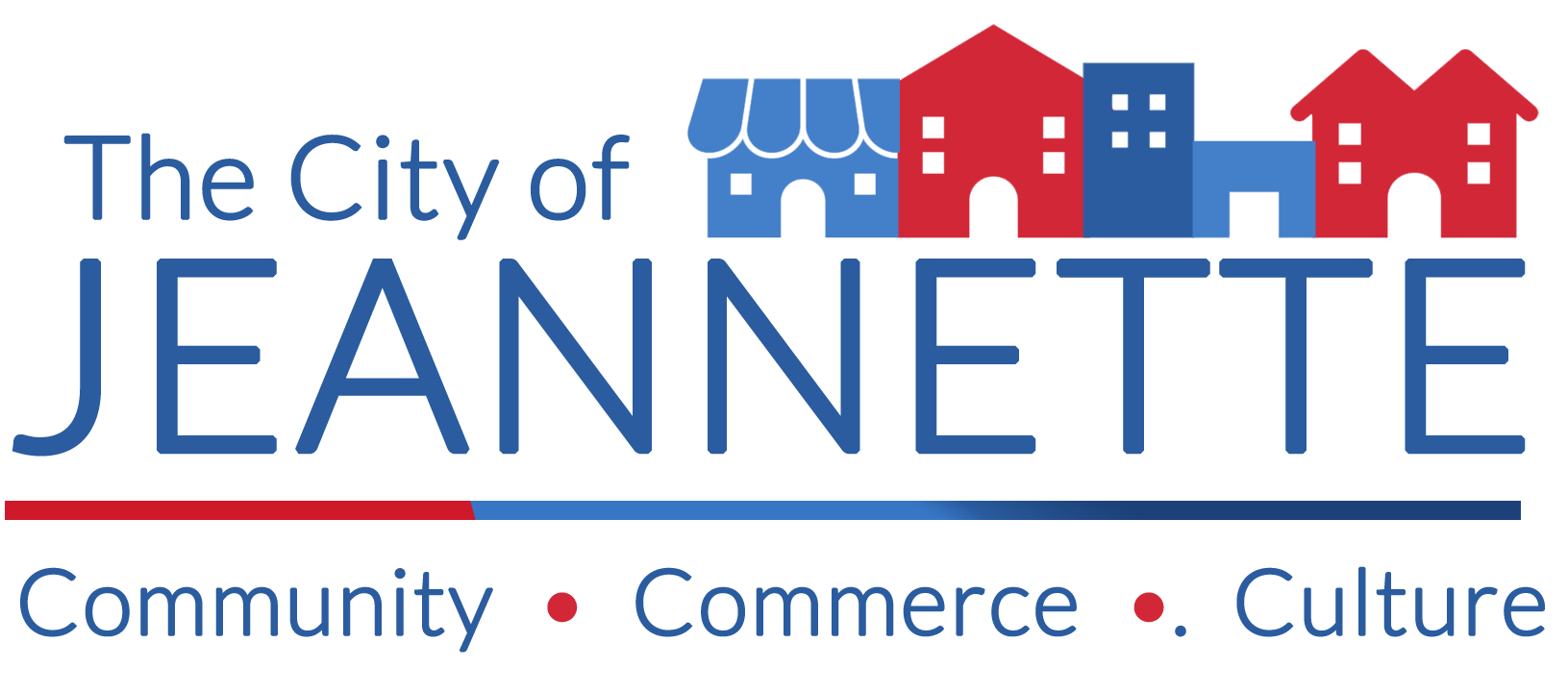
- Logo

- Location of Jeannette in Westmoreland County, Pennsylvania.

- Location within Pennsylvania Location within the United States
- Coordinates: 40°19′44″N 79°36′50″W
- Country: United States
- State: Pennsylvania
- County: Westmoreland
- Settled: 1888
- Incorporated (borough): June 7, 1889
- Incorporated (city): January 1, 1938

Government
  - Type: City Council

Area
  - Total: 2.39 sq mi (6.18 km^{2})
  - Land: 2.39 sq mi (6.18 km^{2})
  - Water: 0 sq mi (0.00 km^{2})

Population (2020)
  - Total: 8,780
  - Density: 3,677.3/sq mi (1,419.81/km^{2})
- Time zone: UTC-5 (Eastern (EST))
  - Summer (DST): UTC-4 (EDT)
- Zip code: 15644
- FIPS code: 42-37784
- Website: City of Jeannette

Jeannette is a city in Westmoreland County, Pennsylvania, United States. The population was 8,780 at the 2020 census. Jeannette was founded in 1888 and named after Jeannette Hartupee McKee, the wife of one of the city's founders, H. Sellers McKee. It is part of the Pittsburgh metropolitan area.

== History ==
Perhaps the oldest historical reference to the area that became Jeannette is the role the area played in the Pontiac War in 1763. The Bushy Run Battlefield marks the spot where Colonel Henry Boquet led the British and American troops to defeat the Indians in a battle on the 5th and 6th of August that year. This victory is credited with helping to prevent the capture of Fort Pitt, and it served the purpose of reopening communication and supply lines. The 200-acre (0.81 km^{2}) historical landmark is the site of a museum, nature trails, picnic areas, and an annual reenactment of the Battle of Bushy Run.

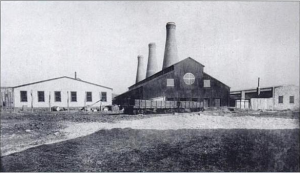
McKee Glass Factory, late 1880s

First incorporated as a borough on June 7, 1889, Jeannette earned the nickname as "the glass city" in recognition of the numerous glass plants founded in the area, with those factories contributing to the city's original stature as the first large manufacturing town in Westmoreland County. The glass industry was so significant that the city's name actually comes from Jeannette E. Hartupee McKee, the wife of H. Sellers McKee, a local industrialist who cofounded the Chambers and McKee Glass Works and was a member of the elite South Fork Fishing and Hunting Club of Johnstown Flood fame. Mckee and his partner J.A. Chambers also have the distinction of naming Jeannette's main street, Clay Avenue after their financial backer, Richard W. Clay. On January 1, 1938, Jeannette became a third class city with Attorney John M. OConnell as the first mayor.

There were as many as 7 significant factories operating in the city of Jeannette including some of the most well known in the history of the glass industry. Names like Jeannette Glass; Fort Pitt Glass; the Pittsburgh Lamp, Brass and Glass Company; American-Saint Gobain, Westmoreland Glass; and others all supplied the country with everything from plate glass windows, to bottles, to milk glass, and much more for many decades. Some estimates over the years indicate that Jeannette once produced somewhere between 70 and 85% of the world's glass. Unfortunately, Jeannette's glass industry was one of the early United States industry victims of cheap, foreign competition that made it less expensive to produce glass overseas and today only two glass factories remain in the city.

Elliott Company dates back to 1914 when William Swan Elliott moved his company to Jeannette. The Elliott Company, owned by the Carrier Corporation from 1957 until 1979 and by United Technologies Corporation until a 1987 buyout that returned the company to a privately owned status, only to become an Ebara Corporation subsidiary in 2000, has always had a solid reputation in the dynamo, turbine, and large rotating equipment industry. In 1952, the company produced the first diesel-engine turbocharger used in a racecar and subsequently built more than 40,000 more of them for other diesel applications. Throughout the 1970s, local residents routinely witnessed a revolving door of trains hauling parts into the plant on North 4th Street and hauling the huge turbine engines back down the tracks. Today, the Elliott Company is the city's largest employer. Jeannette is also the manufacturing home of Jensen Steam Engine Mfg. Co., Inc., which produces small working models of steam engines and turbines. The Jensen shop is only a few blocks from the Elliott plant. In 2018, the Elliott Company was approved to purchase the former Jeannette Glass site and expand their operations to downtown Jeannette.

Monsour Medical Center was a 100-bed hospital when it opened in Jeannette, Pennsylvania, in 1958. The Hospital was state-of-the-art in its day, but later fell into financial trouble and was closed in the early 2000's.

Pennsylvania Rubber Works, which moved to Jeannette from Erie, Pennsylvania around 1903, was another key part of the city's industrial base. Not only did this factory become a significant supplier of play balls including basketballs, footballs, and tennis balls, as well as carpet underlay as part of General Tire in its later years; the original Pennsylvania Rubber Works provided products for Jeeps and gas masks during World War II.

== Geography ==
Jeannette is located at 40°19′44″N 79°36′50″W (40.328773, -79.613997).

According to the United States Census Bureau, the city has a total area of 2.39 square miles (6.2 km^{2}), all land.

== Demographics ==
Historical population
Census	Pop.	Note	%±
1890	3,296		—
1900	5,865		77.9%
1910	8,077		37.7%
1920	10,627		31.6%
1930	15,126		42.3%
1940	16,220		7.2%
1950	16,172		−0.3%
1960	16,565		2.4%
1970	15,209		−8.2%
1980	13,106		−13.8%
1990	11,221		−14.4%
2000	10,654		−5.1%
2010	9,654		−9.4%
2020	8,780		−9.1%

=== 2020 census ===
As of the 2020 census, Jeannette had a population of 8,780. The median age was 42.7 years. 19.8% of residents were under the age of 18 and 18.8% of residents were 65 years of age or older. For every 100 females there were 93.2 males, and for every 100 females age 18 and over there were 90.4 males age 18 and over.

100.0% of residents lived in urban areas, while 0.0% lived in rural areas.

There were 4,062 households in Jeannette, of which 22.0% had children under the age of 18 living in them. Of all households, 35.2% were married-couple households, 23.1% were households with a male householder and no spouse or partner present, and 32.9% were households with a female householder and no spouse or partner present. About 37.6% of all households were made up of individuals and 14.5% had someone living alone who was 65 years of age or older.

There were 4,748 housing units, of which 14.4% were vacant. The homeowner vacancy rate was 3.6% and the rental vacancy rate was 14.8%.

Racial composition as of the 2020 census
Race	Number	Percent
White	7,274	82.8%
Black or African American	698	7.9%
American Indian and Alaska Native	5	0.1%
Asian	26	0.3%
Native Hawaiian and Other Pacific Islander	1	0.0%
Some other race	67	0.8%
Two or more races	709	8.1%
Hispanic or Latino (of any race)	147	1.7%

=== 2010 census ===
As of the 2010 census, there were 9,654 people, 4,630 households, and 2,949 families residing in the city. The population density was 4,414.3 inhabitants per square mile (1,704.4/km^{2}). There were 5,139 housing units at an average density of 2,129.3 per square mile (822.1/km^{2}). The racial makeup of the city was 77.81% white, 20.19% African American, 0.08% Native American, 0.09% Asian, 0.04% Pacific Islander, 0.20% from other races, and 1.60% from two or more races. Hispanic or Latino of any race were 0.50% of the population.

There were 4,630 households, out of which 26.7% had children under the age of 18 living with them, 45.3% were married couples living together, 14.9% had a female householder with no husband present, and 36.3% were non-families. 32.4% of all households were made up of individuals, and 15.9% had someone living alone who was 65 years of age or older. The average household size was 2.29 and the average family size was 2.89.

In the city, the population was spread out, with 22.1% under the age of 18, 7.4% from 18 to 24, 28.4% from 25 to 44, 22.2% from 45 to 64, and 20.0% who were 65 years of age or older. The median age was 40 years. For every 100 females, there were 87.6 males. For every 100 females age 18 and over, there were 83.5 males.

The median income for a household in the city in 2011 was $31,498. The median income for a family was $37,038. Males had a median income of $32,413 versus $21,702 for females. The per capita income for the city was $15,961. About 10.9% of families and 15.0% of the population were below the poverty line, including 21.2% of those under age 18 and 13.2% of those age 65 or over.

=== Religion ===
In 1943, the city went before the Supreme Court to defend an ordinance that banned distributing religious materials door to door. Several members of the Jehovah's Witnesses challenged the constitutionality of the law but were defeated in Douglas v. City of Jeannette.

== Parks and recreation ==
The Jeannette Parks and Recreation Department maintains eight parks including playgrounds, ball fields, and basketball courts.

== Government ==
Jeannette maintains a Police Department, a Fire Department, a Public Library, a Parks and Recreation department, and a department of Public Works. The city operates two refuse trucks daily, covering residential and commercial accounts, five days a week. Commercial accounts are served on a pre-set schedule, either daily or as needed. Recycling is mandatory in Jeannette. The city employs a community development coordinator and staff to assist residents.

== Education ==
Jeannette City School District includes McKee Elementary School and Jeannette Junior/Senior High School.

== Notable people ==
- Steve August, NFL offensive tackle for Seattle Seahawks (1977–84) and Pittsburgh Steelers (1984)
- Karen D. Beyer, former State Representative for the 131st district in the Lehigh Valley
- Buster Clarkson, Negro league baseball player, lived in Jeannette after he retired
- Demetrious Cox, American football player
- Claire Cribbs, two-time All-American basketball player at the University of Pittsburgh (1933–34 and 1934–35)
- Ambrose Battista De Paoli, Roman Catholic Archbishop and nuncio
- Frank Fitzsimmons, president of International Brotherhood of Teamsters 1967–1981, born in Jeannette
- Mike Getto, All-American football player at the University of Pittsburgh and football coach for the National Football League's Brooklyn Dodgers (1942)
- Monica Lee Gradischek, voice actress
- Slide Hampton, jazz trombonist, born in Jeannette
- Dick Hoak, former Pittsburgh Steelers running back (1969–70) and running backs coach (1972–2006), born in Jeannette
- Jack G. Merrell, United States Air Force four-star general
- Vaughn Monroe, 1940s–1950s bandleader, singer and actor; attended high school in Jeannette
- Marissa Moss, author of more than a dozen children's books who was born in Jeannette and moved to California at age 2
- Terrelle Pryor, former high school quarterback for Jeannette Jayhawks, starting quarterback for Ohio State Buckeyes, and NFL quarterback and wide receiver
- LaMont "ShowBoat" Robinson, basketball player Harlem Roadkings, Harlem Clowns
- William A. Shomo, ace fighter pilot and World War II Medal of Honor recipient
