= George Pitts =

George Pitts may refer to:

- George Pitts (Middlesex cricketer) (1878–1939), Canadian-born cricketer
- George Pitts (cricketer, died 1847), English cricketer
- George Pitts (journalist) (1925–1987), newspaper journalist, father of the photographer by the same name
- George Pitts (photographer) (1951–2017), American photographer
