= C20H29NO =

The molecular formula C_{20}H_{29}NO (molar mass: 299.45 g/mol, exact mass: 299.2249 u) may refer to:

- Gemazocine (R-15,497)
- Ibazocine
- 2-Propanoyl-3-(4-isopropylphenyl)-tropane
