= Pitt =

Pitt most commonly refers to:

- The University of Pittsburgh, commonly known as Pitt, a university located in Pittsburgh, Pennsylvania, United States
  - Pitt Panthers, the athletic teams of the University of Pittsburgh
- Pitt (surname), a surname of English origin, particularly associated with two British Prime Ministers:
  - William Pitt, 1st Earl of Chatham (William Pitt the Elder) (1708–1778), Prime Minister of Great Britain (1766–1768)
  - William Pitt the Younger (1759–1806), son of the above and Prime Minister of Great Britain (1783–1801) and of the United Kingdom (1801 and 1804–1806)

== Education ==
- Pittsburg State University ("Pitt State"), located in Pittsburg, Kansas, United States

== Geography ==
- Pitt County, North Carolina, a county in the United States
- Pitt, Hampshire, a hamlet in Hursley parish, Hampshire, England
- Pitt Island, an island in the Chatham Archipelago, New Zealand
- Pitt River (Canada), a river in British Columbia, Canada
- Pitt River (New Zealand), a river in Fiordland, New Zealand
- The River Pitt, a river in Somerset, England
- Pit River, a river in California, United States, which is sometimes referred to as "Pitt River"

== Fiction ==
- Pitt (character), a comic book character published by Image Comics and Full Bleed Studios
- The Pitt (comics), a single-issue comic book published in 1987 by Marvel Comics
- The Pitt, a medical drama on HBO Max
- Fallout 3: The Pitt, the second downloadable content pack for Fallout 3
- Dirk Pitt, the protagonist of a series of bestselling adventure novels written by Clive Cussler
- Justin Pitt, a minor character in the television series Seinfeld

== Other uses ==
- Pitt (ship), a number of merchantmen of that name
- HMS Pitt, a number of British warships of that name
- Fort Pitt (disambiguation), a number of military forts of that name

== See also ==
- Pitts (disambiguation)
