= Toby Walker =

Toby Walker may refer to:

- Toby Walker (musician) who worked with Bob Fass
- Toby Walker, character in Annie Oakley (1935 film)
