= Larry Josephson =

American radio producer (1939–2022)

- Born: Norman Lawrence Josephson; May 12, 1939; Los Angeles, California, U.S.
- Died: July 27, 2022 (aged 83); New York City, U.S.
- Education: University of California, Berkeley (BA)
- Occupations: Radio presenter; producer
- Spouses: Charity Alker (divorced); Valerie Magyar (divorced)
- Children: 1

Norman Lawrence Josephson (May 12, 1939 – July 27, 2022) was an American public radio producer. From 1965, he worked in the field of public broadcasting as a producer, host, station manager, engineer, teacher, writer, and consultant. His first show at listener-supported radio station WBAI in New York was influential in developing the free-form radio style of the 1960s and 1970s.

== Early life ==
Josephson was born and raised in Los Angeles, where he attended Alexander Hamilton High School. He once claimed his high school major was "existential calisthenics". He attended the University of California at Berkeley where he received a BA in linguistics with a minor in Mathematics, which he did not complete until 1973. He was a systems analyst and programmer with IBM from 1962 to 1964.

== WBAI ==
Unhappy with his lonely life as an engineer in a cubicle at IBM, he volunteered at WBAI – a listener-supported radio station in New York City. By 1966 he was the host of In the Beginning, the "grumpy" morning program. He had become one of the station's most popular personalities. His morning shows, like those of late night's Bob Fass and Steve Post, became the archetypes of the station's free-form style, which became the precursor to much of the alternative FM radio programming which started in the 1960s and 1970s. Audience members would wake up to whatever caught Josephson's fancy each day. For example, after the release of The Beatles' "Lady Madonna" in March 1968, Josephson liked the song so much that he played it over and over for two hours.

Josephson became the Assistant Manager of WBAI, and oversaw the design and construction of the station when it moved to a new location in 1971. He was the General Manager of the station from 1974 until 1976. In the Beginning continued until 1972. Another of Josephson's shows Bourgeois Liberation ran on WBAI from 1979 to 1984.

Between 1972 and 1974, Josephson hosted a program on KPFA in Berkeley, California, where his shows on Little People of America helped to win him first prize in the Major Armstrong Radio Awards, administered by Columbia University, in the category of noncommercial community radio.

After a five-year absence from New York City airwaves, Josephson returned in 1989 with Modern Times, a two-hour talk show on WNYC that also aired in California and Iowa and ran to 1993.

== Bob & Ray ==
Josephson worked to revive the careers of Bob & Ray. He developed and produced 26 half-hour public radio shows called Classic Bob & Ray which surveyed their entire career. He also developed and produced The Bob and Ray Public Radio Show from 1981 until 1986. This show was broadcast on 250 stations and received several awards, including a 1982 Peabody Award. The show, was later nominated for three Grammy Awards after it was released on cassettes. In 1984 Josephson produced Bob & Ray: A Night of Two Stars at Carnegie Hall in New York City. Both performances were sold out, and an audio cassette produced from the performance was nominated for a Grammy.

== Teaching, seminars, consulting, and writing ==
Josephson taught radio production at NYU and The New School. With funding from the Corporation for Public Broadcasting and the National Endowment for the Arts, he co-produced the Airlie Seminars on the Art of Radio four times between 1977 and 1983. He is also the editor of Telling the Story, NPR's Guide to Journalism published in 1981. He has also served as a consultant to the Corporation for Public Broadcasting, National Public Radio, NTIA and individual public radio stations.

With the help of grants from the National Endowment for the Arts and the New York State Council on the Arts, Josephson amassed a large recording-tape library of 1970s and 1980s "talking machine sounds" such as phone services like The Big Apple Report and The Story Lady as well as other kinds of recorded voices, which Josephson found so disturbing that he titled his project Vox Inhumana.

== Personal life and death ==
Josephson was married to, and divorced from, Charity Alker and Valerie Magyar. He had one daughter, Jennie, a radio and TV producer. He died from complications of Parkinson's disease at a care facility in Manhattan on July 27, 2022, aged 83.

== Radio productions ==
- In the Beginning – WBAI, 1966–72
- The Colgate Human Comedy Hour – KPFA, 1972–73
- The Little People or Think Big – KPFA, a documentary about a visit to a dwarf convention. Received an Armstrong Award.
- Bourgeois Liberation – WBAI, 1979–84
- Classic Bob & Ray
- The Bob and Ray Public Radio Show – 1981–86
- Modern Times – KCRW, WNYC, American Public Radio 1988–93
- BRIDGES: A Liberal/Conservative Dialogue – CPB 1994–1999.
- Bloomsday on Broadway (with Isaiah Sheffer) – live marathon readings of James Joyce's Ulysses. 1981–91.
- What Is a Jew? 1999
- Only in America – a 6-hour history of Jewish-Americans
