= Peach pit =

A peach pit is the pit or stone of a peach.

Peach pit or peachpit may also refer to:

- Peach-Pit (manga artist duo), a manga artist duo
- Peach Pit (band), a Canadian indie pop band
- Peachpit, a publishing company
- The Peach Pit, a fictional diner in the Beverly Hills, 90210 franchise

== See also ==
- The Pit (disambiguation)
