= Charles Pitts (broadcaster) =

American radio personality and activist (1941–2015)

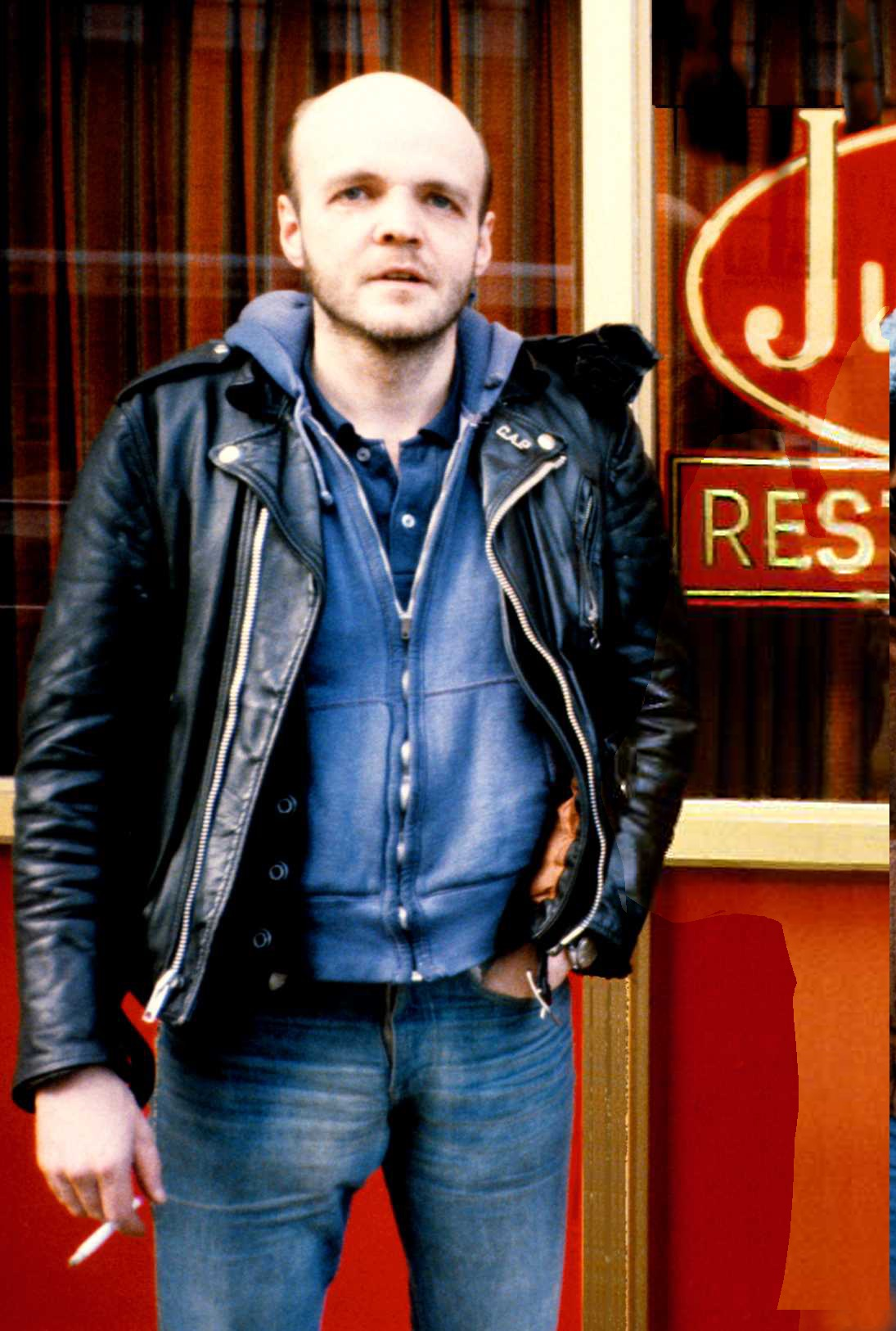
- Pitts in New York City (date unknown)
- Born: July 24, 1941; Jamestown, New York, U.S.
- Died: May 21, 2015 (aged 73)
- Occupations: Journalist, radio host, radio engineer activist
- Presenting career
- Show: The New Symposium, Homosexual News, Out of the Slough
- Station: WBAI
- Style: Free Form
- Country: United States

Charles Pitts (July 24, 1941 – May 21, 2015) was an American gay activist and radio personality. He co-hosted The New Symposium on New York City's WBAI from 1968 to 1969, the first weekly public radio program to offer an affirming discussion of homosexuality by openly gay hosts. After the Stonewall Riots, he co-founded the Gay Liberation Front in New York City and continued his audio activism through the program Homosexual News. From 1971 to 1973, his weekly WBAI show Out of the Slough broke barriers as the first freeform radio show centered on gay politics and culture.

== Early life and family ==
Charles Pitts was born on July 24, 1941, in Jamestown, New York. His childhood home was at 509 Lakeview Avenue in Jamestown.

His father, George B. Pitts Jr. (1905–1997), ran Pitts Home and Garden, a home and hardware store inherited from his father. As a young man, he had been enrolled as a student of philosophy and religion at the University of Chicago, intending to become a minister or social worker, before a family crisis forced him to return to Jamestown. Driven by a social conscience, he integrated his company's workforce, introduced an innovative profit-sharing plan for his employees, and helped create the local community college. Charles recalled him as a loving, well-intentioned man who provided for his family despite his life's disappointments, and who attempted to love and accept his son while unable to understand his homosexuality and unconventional life.

His mother Frances Pitts (1911–2012), was born Frances Warrington Porter in Falconer, New York. After marrying George B. Pitts Jr. she also worked for Pitts Home and Garden, and later in life was involved in founding the Bioregional Conservancy and Reclamation Trust in Maine. Frances and George Pitts had four children, including Charles, his sisters Mary and Martha, and his brother Robert.

As a student at Jamestown High School, Charles Pitts already exhibited many of the interests that he would maintain throughout his lifetime. While an honor roll student, he found time to explore many hobbies and passions; he participated in the “Lyceum” debating society, served on the editorial committee of the school yearbook, was a school PA announcer, and held the vice president role in the Radio Club. He participated in a group of students that produced a radio program broadcast weekly on local FM stations. A yearbook caption identified him as a “hard worker” with “original ideas,” interested in photography and radio electronics.

After high school, Pitts was briefly confined in a psychiatric unit at Gowanda State Hospital, related to his homosexuality. After emerging from the hospital, he began to publicly acknowledge his sexuality to his family and others.

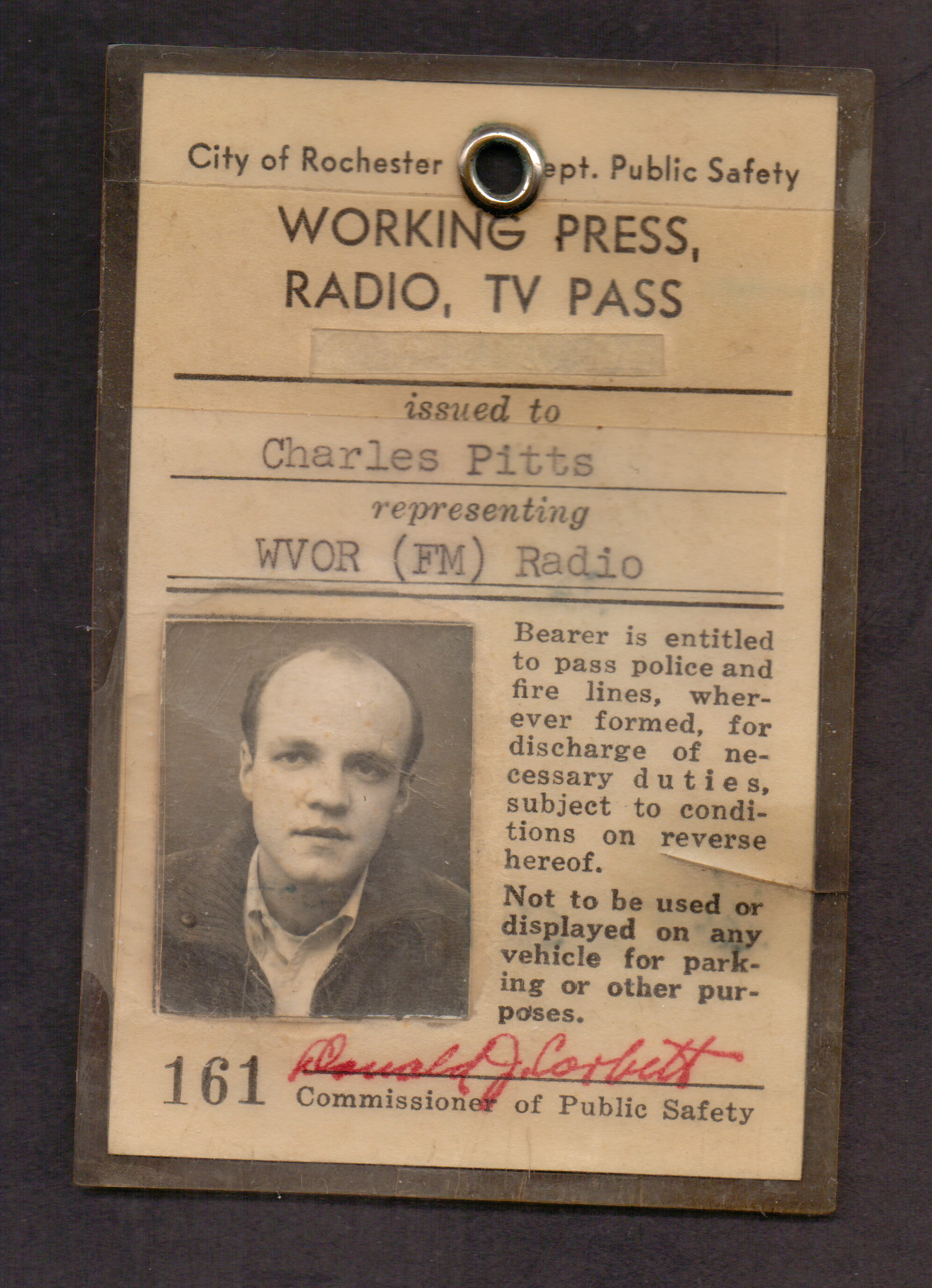
Press Pass for WVOR FM in Rochester, c. 1964

== Early career ==
In the early 1960s, Pitts attended Jamestown Community College and worked at WJTN, the town's local radio station. He later studied at Allegheny College in Meadville, Pennsylvania, where he hosted the college's program on a local radio station. Before moving to New York City, he held positions at several commercial radio stations around the state, including Rochester, Salamanca, and Olean. From 1965 to 1967 he worked for Cine Magnetics in Mamaroneck, NY, where he recorded audio soundtracks for sales presentations and teaching aids on 8-millimeter film, before moving to Manhattan.

== Move to New York City ==
In the mid-1960s, Pitts decided to move to New York City. A major impetus for his relocation was to seek treatment from psychotherapist C.A. Tripp, whose perspective that homosexuality constituted “a difference rather than an illness” promised a route towards a more affirming self-understanding. Tripp had worked under Dr. Alfred Kinsey studying human sexuality at the Kinsey Institute, became an advisor to the New York Mattachine Society, and would gain prominence as the author of The Homosexual Matrix, a controversial but influential 1975 book critiquing psychoanalytic perspectives on homosexuality and arguing in favor of social acceptance of homosexuals. Upon arriving in Manhattan, Pitts met with Tripp, joined a therapy group of other gay men led by Wardell Pomeroy, and soon “developed a strong and positive gay identity and a deep anger at the cultural standards that for so long had kept him guilty and unhappy.” While exploring the city's gay world, Pitts also became an active participant in hippie and countercultural circles.

During his early years in New York City, Pitts worked as a freelance sound engineer for a range of companies, including recording radio programs and commercials for Cinema Sound, Ltd. And museum and historical site tours for the Acoustiguide Corporation. He performed location dialog recording for various film projects, including the movies Greetings (1968), The Projectionist (1970), and Love and Kisses (1971). He also attended the Woodstock Festival in August 1969, where he worked as a sound engineer with a film crew documenting the performances. Their work would be released in the 1970 documentary film Woodstock; in addition to winning an Academy Award for Best Documentary Feature, the film also received a nomination for Best Sound. Charles appears briefly at 13:40 in the later Woodstock Diary feature, recording the film sound.

== WBAI Radio and gay activism ==
As a lifelong radio enthusiast, Pitts quickly gravitated to WBAI upon moving to Manhattan, where he worked as an engineer and announcer off and on from 1967 to 1973. Longtime WBAI participant Steve Post recalled that Pitts simply wandered into the studio at some point, announcing his intention to volunteer, and by persistently showing up and taking on tasks had managed to secure engineering and announcing roles at the station. At WBAI, Pitts interacted with a range of countercultural and New Left radicals, whose convictions that “individuals could revolutionize society by thinking and acting in new ways” helped to bolster his determination to live openly as a gay man. His participation in community radio fed directly into his activism in the emerging gay liberation movement.

In 1968, Pitts along with Baird Searles, Bill Weaver, and other gay men launched a weekly radio program on WBAI called “The New Symposium.” The program's stated goal was “inspiring a sense of social identification within our subculture.” In contrast to the standard practice of a previous generation of homophile activists who wrote and spoke publicly using pseudonyms, all of the gay men who participated in “The New Symposium” used their legal names. The thirty minute shows featured discussions between the hosts, invited guests, and callers, exploring a wide range of themes relevant to gay men and lesbians. Topics included couples and relationships, the leather scene, physique magazines, gay and lesbian youth, employment, hustlers, cruising, homosexuality in literature, anti-gay violence, and religion. The show became famous in the New York City area gay community, recognized by listeners for the openness of its hosts and its candid conversation on controversial topics that had rarely, if ever, been discussed in public media before.

== Founding of the Gay Liberation Front ==
As historian David Carter notes, “Pitts’s position as an openly gay radio personality positioned him to take action in the immediate aftermath of the Stonewall Riots.” Shortly after the riots had taken place, SDS activist Bill Katzenberg contacted Pitts, suggesting that the two discuss creating a radical gay organization. The two arranged to meet, and Pitts invited Pete Wilson, an activist with the New York City Sexual Freedom League and a frequent guest on "The New Symposium." During their meeting, Pitts came up with the slogan that would appear on the flyer promoting the new organization: “Do you think homosexuals are revolting? You bet your sweet ass we are!”

Before the riots, Katzenberg and fellow gay New Left activist John O’Brien had already reserved space at Alternate U for a meeting on July 24. Alternate U, located on the second floor of 530 Sixth Avenue at West 14th Street in Greenwich Village, was “a free counterculture school and leftist political organizing center” and a “radical haven.” Pitts, Katzenberg, and Wilson agreed to promote the July 24th meeting as an opportunity for homosexuals to “make a place for ourselves in the revolutionary movement.”

Pitts joined Katzenberg, Weaver, O’Brien, and about forty other radical homosexuals at the July 24th meeting. Lesbian writer and activist Karla Jay recalled that the crowd included “drag queens, bar dykes, street people, feminists, radical students, leftists, socialists, Marxists, Maoists, anarchists, libertarians, hippies, and former Yippies.” Pitts later recalled the early GLF meetings as “mind-bending,” marked by conflicts over purpose, methods, and strategy, and diverging over whether to focus specifically on homosexuality versus organizing as gay people to participate in the broader revolutionary movement.

While participating in the GLF, Pitts continued his exploration of gay themes through radio. In 1969, the WBAI program director fired Pitts for refusing to adhere to the station's music policies. In response, Pitts called a meeting with other staffers at which he argued that the true reason for his termination lay in the fears of heterosexual staffers that the station was “being taken over by homosexuals.” Although he was not reinstated at first, he continued to spend time at the station as a volunteer until he was rehired by different staff some months later. From 1970 to 1971, Pitts co-hosted with Pete Wilson the show “Homosexual News” on WBAI, consisting of reports on local and national current events relating to gay men, lesbians, and sexuality.

== “Out of the Slough” program on WBAI ==
In 1971, WBAI agreed to give Pitts time in the programming schedule to use for his own gay-themed freeform radio show. His new program, titled “Out of the Slough,” first aired on July 3, 1971. Shows centered around discussions with callers, along with Pitts’ reflections on gay life, current events, and articles from local media as well as music. The show continued until January 1973.

The program provided an opportunity for many gay people to connect with others, explore ideas, and express themselves. For example, gay singer-songwriter Michael Cohen, after listening to Pitts’ show, stopped by WBAI to bring him a tape of his songs. Despite getting into “a violent ideological argument” with the young musician, Pitts nonetheless played the tape on his Saturday night show, invited him back to the station to record more tracks, and interviewed him on subsequent shows. Cohen's first self-titled album was recorded at WBAI, engineered and produced by Pitts, including one song recorded live on the air during “Out of the Slough” in September 1972. Cohen went on to release two additional albums on the Smithsonian Folkways record label.

Pitts’ show attracted controversy and condemnation from some listeners and WBAI staff. One outraged listener writing to the station in 1972 castigated Pitts as “spiteful, intolerant, and tedious, and a querulous spoiled brat to boot.” Journalist John Dalmas from the Rockland County Journal-News argued that Pitts “has a reputation for being a gay bigot—he puts down gays who don’t swing his way” and claimed that “Out of the Slough” had “done little to advance the cause of gay liberation.” WBAI producer Paul McIsaac, while considering himself both a supporter of gay liberation and a personal friend of Pitts, questioned the show's style and expressed discomfort over the content, particularly its discussion of intergenerational sex.

Despite the complaints of its critics, the show proved an important influence for a significant number of young gay men. George Plagianos, who grew up Brooklyn and would go on to become an activist in ACT-UP, remembers that after acknowledging his homosexuality but before actually meeting other gay people, he learned about gay life and politics by listening to Pitts’ show on WBAI. Victor Patin began listening to “Out of the Slough” in eleventh grade, and described how his life was profoundly changed by having Pitts “with me, guiding me, giving me strength” through his voice and the voices of the other gay young people who called and wrote in to the show. R. Paul Martin, host of WBAI's free-form “Back of the Book” radio show, described his importance for the gay community: “By the ‘70s and ‘80s the number of gay men who acknowledged having been educated about gay male life and issues by Charles Pitts’ broadcasts was astounding.”

In May 1973, Charles Pitts was again fired by WBAI manager Jerry Coffin. While he would continue to spend time at the WBAI studio and appeared as a guest on other shows, he would not host his own program on the station again.

== Beating and recovery ==
Around 4:30 AM on February 18th, 1978, Pitts was violently attacked by a stranger while waiting for a cab home in the Chelsea neighborhood of Manhattan. After spending the evening at a gay leather bar and then eating at an all-night restaurant, he was walking on 22nd Street towards 10th Avenue when an unknown man accosted him and began hitting him. Pitts did not fight back, but attempted to call for help. The attacker eventually began to walk away, but when Pitts attempted to reach a telephone booth to call for help, the man returned and resumed beating him. He lost consciousness, and was eventually transported to St. Vincent’s Hospital by a police officer, where he awoke in the emergency room.

The motivation for the attack was unknown. While the attacker did not use any verbal anti-gay slurs, Pitts understood the assault within the broader context of a wave of anti-gay violence taking place in New York City at the time. As he explained in a radio interview a month after the attack, “My getting beaten up was necessary for society to continue as it is now; whoever beat me up was also playing his part. These things are necessary in order to continue the oppression of homosexuals.”

Pitts’ injuries were severe, including a splintered nose, a jaw broken in several places that had to be wired together, orbital fractures around the eyes, and major swelling to his head. The damage required a week of recovery at St. Vincent's, followed by a two-week stay at Bellevue where he underwent five hours of plastic surgery. Over the course of the year he underwent five different reconstructive operations, spending 48 days in hospitals. Recovery proceeded slowly, requiring a long regimen of pain medication; he would suffer from chronic pain as a result of his injuries for years.

== Later life ==
Pitts continued to work in commercial radio through much of his time in New York City. He served as a Production Engineer at WNCN-FM from 1976 to 1991. In addition to his work miking, recording, editing, and mixing, he wrote a computer program called “Sked” to facilitate scheduling feature broadcasts. His commercial work garnered recognition through several industry awards, including sharing a Peabody Award and a Major Armstrong Award for his work on the program “Conversations with Horowitz,” and another Peabody Award for “New York City Musicbox.” In 1994, he began working at as a production engineer at WQXR until his retirement.

Pitts died on May 21, 2015, from lung disease.

== Social and political beliefs ==
=== Sexual freedom ===
Historian Toby Marotta notes that Pitts marked an exception from the norm among early Gay Liberation Front activists, who had become politicized within the New Left and generally lacked a “strong and positive sense of identification with the gay subculture.” By contrast, Pitts and a few others were “self-taught radicals with strong libertarian biases and little experience in the organized Movement,” which informed his divergent perspective from the nascent sexual politics of the GLF radicals. While many of the young activists criticized gay male sexual culture, condemning promiscuity and anonymous sex, Pitts consistently defended and celebrated it.

Pitts insisted that young people were sexual beings and deserved the opportunity to explore their erotic selves with themselves, their peers, and adults. His support for the right of younger and older people to form intergenerational sexual relationships, as he advocated in discussions on his program “Out of the Slough,” proved one of his most controversial topics, attracting significant criticism.

Pitts was a practitioner and defender of S&M and a participant in the gay leather community. While emphatically defending the validity of consensual S&M, Pitts joined with other “radical gay sadists” in criticizing the “conservatism, consumerism, hipsterism, and outright sexism” he perceived in gay male leather and S&M communities emerging visibly in the 1970s and exemplified by figures such as filmmaker Fred Halsted and author Larry Townsend.

=== Consumerism ===
Pitts was a vehement critic of consumerism, particularly its impact on gay communities. In a 1989 letter to his doctor published in the journal And Then, he lamented that before the AIDS epidemic, gay men “bought into an ugly, vicious scene, where one’s value was only what could be currency in that money-culture: money itself, or saleable good looks.” In contrast to the original inclusive, counter-cultural message of gay liberation, he believed, they were “utterly consumed with what they could consume, since their freedom and equality as human beings ended with their wallet or their credit line, whichever went first.”

=== Free speech ===
Pitts passionately advocated for free speech without restrictions. He put this belief into practice in his radio shows, refusing to censor himself or others even when this brought him into conflict with the FCC, station management, listeners, and friends.

By the early 1980s, Pitts had become involved in the Libertarian Party.

== See also ==
- List of LGBT rights activists
- Gay Liberation
- WBAI
- Freeform radio
- Gay Liberation Front
