= Carwyn =

Carwyn or Caerwyn is a Welsh male given name. Notable people with the name include:

- Carwyn Davies (1964–1997), Welsh international rugby union player
- Carwyn Ellis (born 1973), Welsh musician, composer, and producer
- Carwyn James (1929–1983), Welsh rugby union player and coach
- Carwyn Jones (born 1967), Welsh politician and former First Minister of Wales
- Carwyn Jones (rugby union) (born 1993), Welsh rugby union player
- Carwyn Penny (born 1998), Welsh rugby union player
- Caerwyn Roderick (1927-2011), Welsh politician
- Carwyn Tuipulotu (born 2001), Welsh rugby union player
- Carwyn Williams (born 1965), Welsh surfer
