= Richard Elman (writer) =

American journalist

- Born: Brooklyn, New York
- Occupations: Novelist; poet; journalist; teacher
- Known for: Novels and journalism

Richard M. Elman (April 23, 1934 – December 31, 1997) was an American novelist, poet, journalist, and teacher. He was born in Brooklyn, New York. His parents were Yiddish-speaking and came to the United States at the turn of the 20th century from Russo-Poland. His boyhood is captured in his comic novel Fredi & Shirl & The Kids: An Autobiography In Fables.

At Syracuse University (B. A., 1955), Elman's teachers, Daniel Curley and Donald Dike, encouraged his writing. At Syracuse, Elman met Emily Schorr, who became a painter. They married in 1955, and in 1964 their daughter Margaret was born. The marriage ended in divorce. In 1979, Elman married Alice (Neufeld) Goode, a teacher, who was his wife until his death. Their daughter Lila was born in 1981.

Elman thought of himself as a socialist and his journalism reflected his concerns about social and political injustice.

== Stanford University and its later influence ==
Elman studied English and creative writing at Stanford University (M.A. 1957), where he came under the influence of poet and critic Yvor Winters.

In the 1930s, Winters had been a friend of David Lamson, who had worked at Stanford University Press. Winters defended his friend when Lamson was accused and convicted of killing his wife; after serving time on death row, Lamson was retried and freed after two more trials and hung juries. Elman became familiar with the events, and the crime became the springboard for his novel An Education In Blood. Winters was portrayed in the novel as the character Jim Hill.

Elman describes Winters as well as others he met and befriended at Stanford, such as the poet Thom Gunn and the writer Tillie Olsen, in his memoir, Namedropping: Mostly Literary Memoirs.

== New York and the 1960s ==
Elman returned to New York and worked for Pacifica Radio station WBAI-FM as its public affairs director from 1961 to 1964. He helped Bob Fass, a boyhood friend, get work there. At WBAI, Elman produced radio documentaries, among them the sound montage "The Last Days of Hart Crane", which featured tape-recorded interviews of people who had been close to Crane. Poet Robert Lowell came to the studio to listen to the montage in person, and later contributed to a second montage on Ford Madox Ford's American years.

In 1965, Elman worked as a research associate for the School of Social Work Research Center at Columbia University. His nonfiction The Poorhouse State: The American Way of Life On Public Assistance evolved from those experiences; he spent two years interviewing people on relief on New York's Lower East Side.

In 1967, Elman published another book of reportage, Ill-at-Ease in Compton, about the mechanisms of discrimination at work in Compton, California, a city with a large lower-middle-class population.

Between 1963 and 1966 much of Elman's income came from writing freelance pieces for magazines, including Cavalier, Commonweal, The Nation, and The New Republic. He also reviewed books for The New York Times.

In 1968, Elman published The 28th Day of Elul, the first of a trilogy of novels, followed by Lilo's Diary (1968) and The Reckoning (1969). Each novel tells the same story from a different point of view about the fate of the Yagodahs, a Hungarian family at the end of World War II. Elie Wiesel said of The 28th Day of Elul in his review for The New York Times: "Born and raised in New York City, Richard M. Elman was barely 10 when the nightmare ended in Europe. Yet he evokes some of its living fragmentary images as though his voice came from within."

In 1968, Elman signed the "Writers and Editors War Tax Protest" pledge, vowing to refuse tax payments to protest the Vietnam War.

== Nicaragua and the 1970s and 1980s ==
Elman worked as a journalist in Central America, covering the war in Nicaragua against the Somoza regime. He traveled on assignment for GEO (magazine) with the photojournalist Susan Meiselas and his text accompanied her photos of the Sandinistan rebels. Elman's account of that trip and succeeding visits to Nicaragua are told in his Cocktails at Somoza's: A Reporter's Sketchbook.

Throughout the 1980s, Nicaragua colored Elman's imaginative life. His book of poems In Chontales, his comic novel The Menu Cypher, and his collection of stories Disco Frito are all set in Nicaragua.

== 1990s ==
In his novel Tar Beach, Elman returned to the subject of family life in Brooklyn after World War II. In John Domini's review of the novel, he wrote, "rarely has a slice of life been cut so thin, so elegantly."

His book of poems Cathedral-Tree-Train (1992) is an elegy for a friend, abstract-expressionist painter Keith Sanzenbach.

Elman died shortly before the publication of his memoir, Namedropping: Mostly Literary Memoirs. The book consists of brief portraits of people he met, including Isaac Bashevis Singer, Faye Dunaway, Richard Penniman, and Louise Varèse.

At various times during his career, he taught creative writing: at Bennington College (1967–68), Bennington College Summer Writing Workshop (1974–), Columbia University (1968–1976), Sarah Lawrence (1970), The University of Pennsylvania (1981–83), University of Arizona (Fall 1985), Notre Dame, and Stony Brook University.

== Books ==
=== Novels ===
- A Coat for the Tsar (1958)
- The 28th Day of Elul (1967)
- Lilo's Diary (1968)
- The Reckoning (1969)
- An Education In Blood (1971)
- Fredi & Shirl & The Kids (1972)
- Crossing Over and Other Tales (1973)
- Taxi Driver (based on the screenplay by Paul Schrader) (1976)
- Little Lives (as "John Howland Spyker") (1978)
- The Breadfruit Lotteries (1980)
- Smokey and the Bandit (novelization of films 1 & 2, as "Delmar Hanks") (1981)
- Shannon (novelization of teleplays by Albert Ruben from the US TV series, UK publication only, as "Michael Parnell") (1981)
- The Gangster Chronicles (novelization of teleplays presented as autobiography, bylined as a collaboration between narrating character "Michael Lasker," and Richard Alan Simmons, who wrote an episode of the series) (1981)
- The Menu Cyper (1982)
- Disco Frito (1988)
- Tar Beach (1991)

=== Nonfiction ===
- The Poorhouse State: The American Way of Life on Public Assistance (1966)
- Ill-at-Ease in Compton (1967)
- Charles Booth's London: A Portrait of the Poor at the Turn of the Century, Drawn from His 'Life and Labor of the People in London' by Albert Fried and Richard M. Elman, editors (1968)
- Uptight with the Stones: A Novelist's Report (1973)
- Cocktails at Somoza's: A Reporter's Sketchbook of Events in Revolutionary Nicaragua (1981)
- Namedropping: Mostly Literary Memoirs (1998)

=== Poetry ===
- The Man Who Ate New York (1975)
- Homage to Fats Navarro (1978)
- In Chontales (1980)
- Cathedral-Tree-Train and Other Poems (1992)
- The Phoenician Women (translation) in Euripides, 3: Alcestis, Daughters of Troy, The Phoenician Women, Iphigenia at Aulis, and Rhesus eds. David Slavitt and Palmer Bovie (1998)
- The Girl from Samos (translation) in Menander: The Grouch, Desperately Seeking Justice, Closely Cropped Locks, The Girl from Samos, and The Shield eds. David Slavitt and Palmer Bovie (1998) ISBN 0-8122-1652-0 (paper)
