= Jack G. Merrell =

United States Air Force general

Jack Gordon Merrell
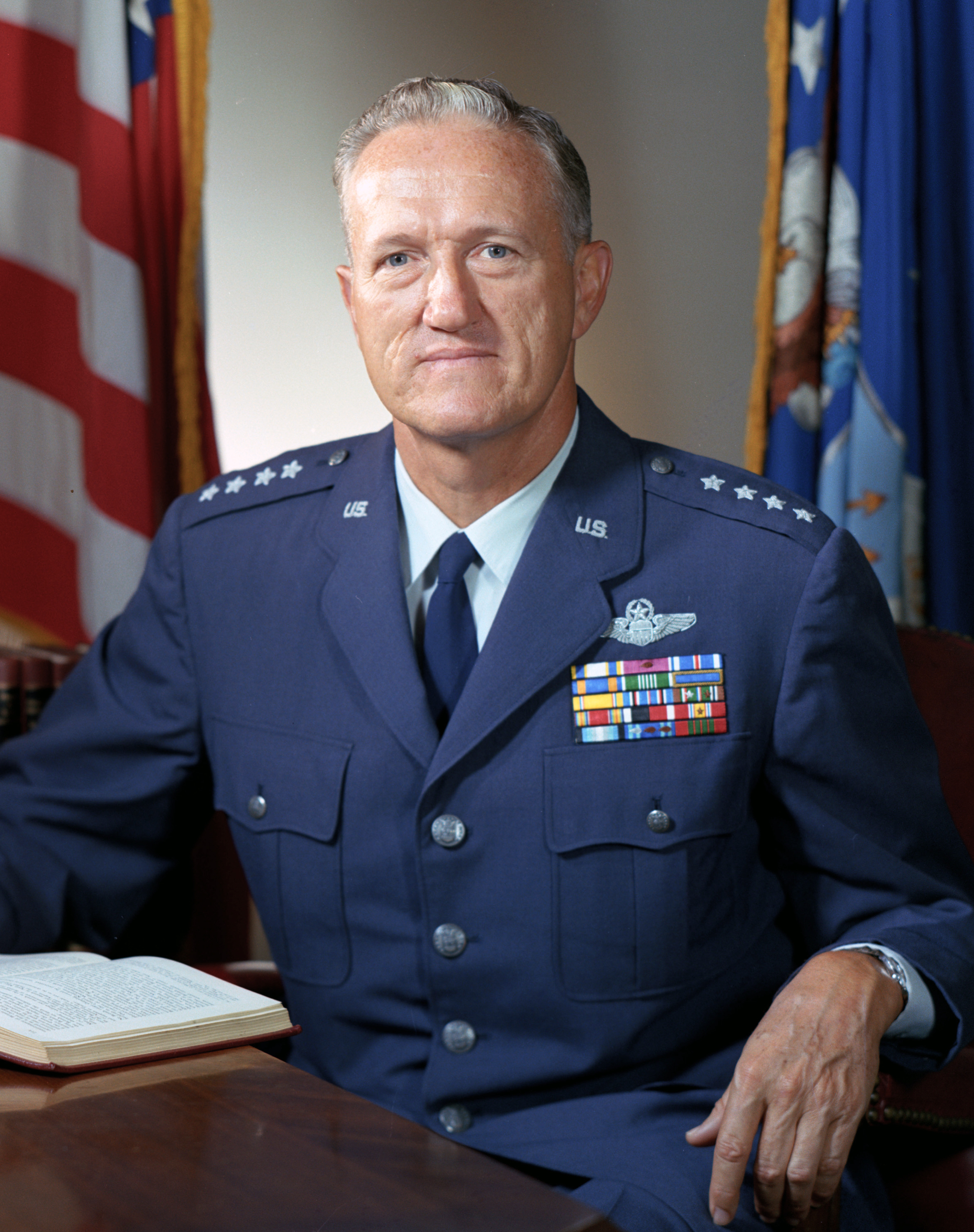
- General Jack G. Merrell
- Born: April 8, 1915; Jeannette, Pennsylvania
- Died: August 15, 1993 (aged 78); San Antonio, Texas
- Military career
- Allegiance: United States of America
- Branch: United States Air Force
- Service years: 1939–1972
- Rank: General
- Commands: Air Force Logistics Command
- Awards: Distinguished Service Medal, Legion of Merit with oak leaf cluster, Distinguished Flying Cross, Air Medal, Army Commendation Medal, and the French Croix de Guerre

General Jack Gordon Merrell (April 8, 1915 – August 15, 1993) was a United States Air Force four-star general who served as Commander, Air Force Logistics Command (COMAFLC) from 1968 to 1972.

== Early life ==
Merrell was born in Jeannette, Pennsylvania, in 1915. He graduated from high school in 1933, attended Braden's Preparatory at Cornwall-on-Hudson, New York, and then entered the United States Military Academy at West Point from which he graduated in the class of 1939 with a bachelor of science degree in military science.

== Military career ==
Merrell was first assigned to the Cavalry, but quickly secured a transfer to the United States Army Air Corps, finishing both primary and advanced flying school within a year after leaving West Point.

=== World War II ===
When the United States entered into World War II, Merrell was serving with the Army Air Corps Training Detachment at Lakeland, Florida. Tours of duty with the 39th and 491st Bombardment Groups as provisional commander, and deputy commander, respectively, followed. In May 1944 he went to England and became the air executive officer of the 491st Bombardment Group and later was commander of the 389th Bombardment Group, Eighth Air Force. At the end of the war he moved with the 389th Group to Charleston, South Carolina.

=== Postwar career ===
From November 1945 until June 1948, Merrell served with the Air Transport Command at Cincinnati, Ohio, Memphis, Tennessee, Fort Totten, New York, and Westover Air Force Base, Massachusetts.

Postwar reorganization changed the Air Transport Command into the Military Air Transport Service; and in July 1948, Merrell became chief of staff for MATS' Atlantic Division. After a year, he was made commander of Kindley Air Force Base, Bermuda. In September 1951, he was assigned to command the 1600th Air Transport Wing, operating out of Westover Air Force Base. From that post he went to the Air War College at Maxwell Air Force Base, Alabama, where he graduated in 1954. He had his next duty tour at U.S. Air Force Headquarters in Washington where he was assigned to the Office of the Deputy Chief of Staff, Personnel, chief of the Plans and Programs Division, in July 1954, and a year later as deputy director, Directorate of Personnel Planning.

Merrell was reassigned to MATS at McGuire Air Force Base, New Jersey, in 1959. There he was deputy commander, then commander of its Eastern Transport component. From McGuire he went to MATS Headquarters, Scott Air Force Base, Illinois, in September 1960 to become deputy chief of staff for plans. In January 1962, he returned to Washington, D.C., to serve as director of the budget, Headquarters U.S. Air Force. He assumed the position of comptroller of the U.S. Air Force in November 1964.

Merrell was named vice commander of U.S. Air Forces in Europe in August 1967, and became commander of the Air Force Logistics Command in March 1968.

A command pilot, his decorations included the Distinguished Service Medal, Legion of Merit with oak leaf cluster, Distinguished Flying Cross, Air Medal, Army Commendation Medal, and the French Croix de Guerre.

== Later life ==
Merrell retired from the Air Force on September 12, 1972 and died on August 15, 1993.
