= Gray v. Pitts =

Massachusetts court case

Gray v. Pitts (1771) was a Suffolk Inferior Court and, later, Superior Court case in the Commonwealth of Massachusetts which contemporary historians have regarded as an example of the "gay panic" defense and an early case regarding cross-dressing in Colonial America.

== Background ==
In 1771 in Boston, a young man Lendall (sometimes spelled "Lindall") Pitts, the son of James Pitts, physically assaulted another young man, John Gray, outside of a local barbershop. At the time, Pitts had shown attraction and "very loving" behavior towards Gray and "gallanted" (flirted) with him, assuming he was a young woman due to Gray's appearance and state of dress. After later realizing that Gray was, in fact, a male, Lendall struck Gray in the scalp with a walking stick, causing a wound to his scalp.

== Case ==
After the assault, Gray decided to press charges against Pitts. Prior to the court proceedings, John Adams was appointed as the attorney for Pitts and Josiah Quincy Jr. as the attorney for Gray.

The first hearing was held in July 1771 in the Suffolk Interior Court, where Gray sued Pitts for £300.

During the hearings, William Molineux testified in Pitt's defense, stating that Gray had dressed in women's clothes and had the "outward appearance of a woman." Other witnesses testified regarding the assault that had taken place. According to the Legal Papers of John Adams, "from a technical standpoint, the case is interesting because, although the plea was not guilty, Adams was allowed to introduce evidence in justification of the blow."

As an outcome of the first case, the jury awarded Gray £5 in compensatory damages. Gray appealed this award to the Suffolk Superior Court, where a new jury increased the damages to £18. Historians and LGBT scholars including Jonathan Ned Katz and Robert Qaks have regarded that Pitt's feelings of insult and anger may have arisen from being an object of jest, and from inadvertently experiencing feelings of attraction for a male that he thought was female, which would regard his defense as an early example of the gay or trans panic defense in a court setting.

=== Outcome ===
Although presiding judge of the Superior Court and colonial Governor Thomas Hutchinson cited a 1696 Massachusetts law (c. 2, §7, 1 A&R 208, 210) which prohibited men or women from cross-dressing, the jury still awarded £18 in compensatory damages to Gray and found him innocent of any guilt or provocation.

== Aftermath and significance ==
The Gray v. Pitts case has been documented and included in the Legal Papers of John Adams. It is primarily preserved in the public record because of Adams' own writings and shorthand notes taken before and during the court proceedings. The case has also been archived and researched as part of the OutHistory LGBT in Colonial America exhibit.
