= PITS =

PITS or Pits may refer to

- Perpetration-induced traumatic stress
- The pits: area of a racetrack where a pit stop is performed

== See also ==
- Pit (disambiguation)
