= Monsour Medical Center =

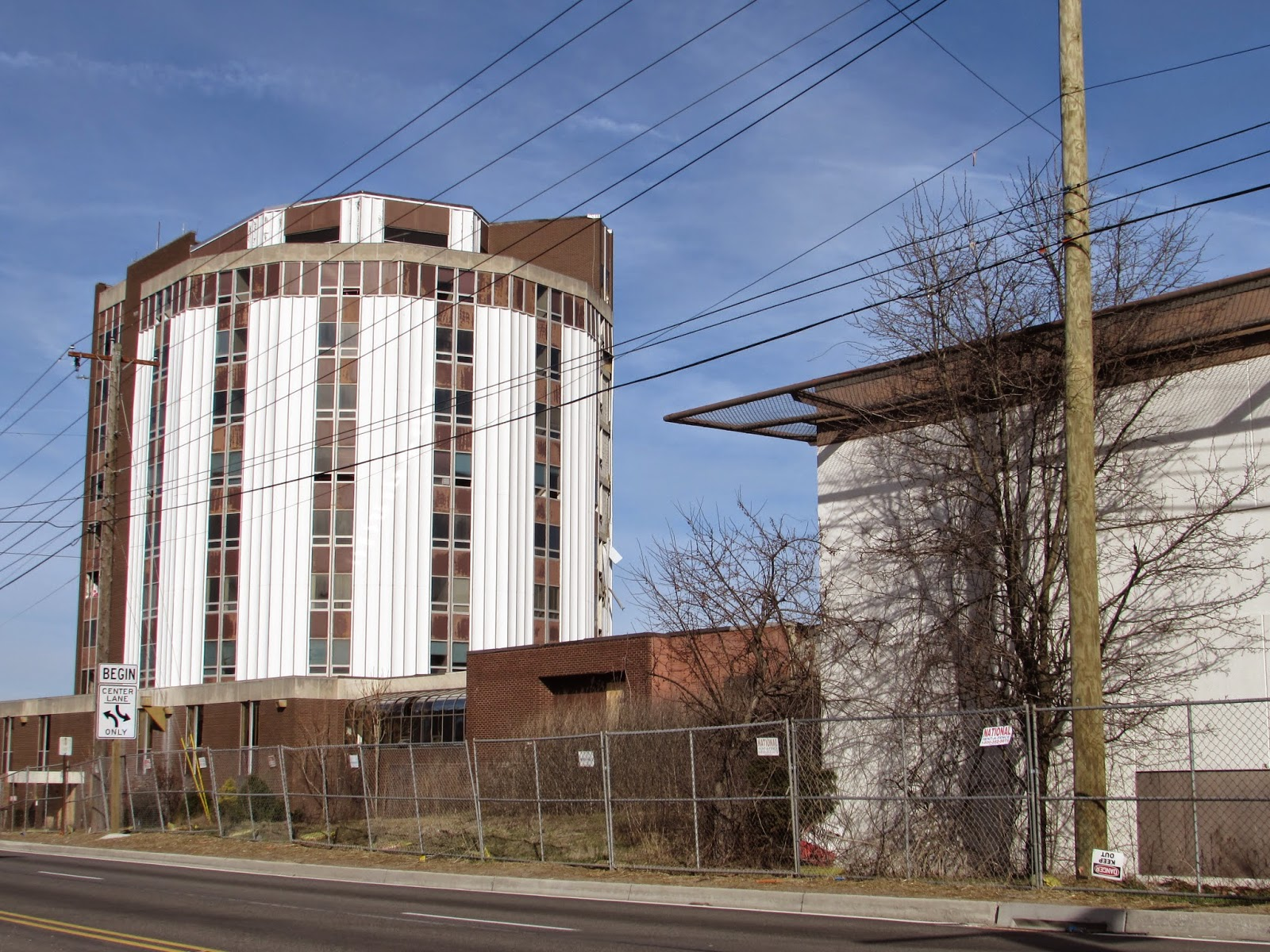

Geography
- Location: Jeannette, Pennsylvania, United States
- Coordinates: 40.311°N 79.610°W

Organization
- Type: General

Services
- Beds: 250

History
- Opened: 1958
- Closed: 2006

Links
- Lists: Hospitals in Pennsylvania

Monsour Medical Center was a 100-bed hospital when it opened in Jeannette, Pennsylvania, in 1958. There was an eleven-story circular tower added in 1971 that increased the total number of beds to 250. The hospital was founded by brothers William, Roy, Robert, and Howard Monsour who were all physicians. The hospital provided medical care to those in Westmoreland County. The hospital closed in 2006 after failing to renew its medical license and has since been demolished starting in 2015. Monsour Medical Center was once a state-of-the-art hospital in its time, but was always plagued with debt.

== Hard times ==
Monsour Medical Center filed for Chapter 11 bankruptcy in 1980, and remained in bankruptcy until 1989. The hospital also began having licensing problems in 2004, and then in 2006 ultimately closed its doors after failing to renew its medical license. The owners locked the doors and walked away from the building leaving behind medications, medical waste, patient files, and many more items that were left at the building. The building became a problem for the city of Jeanette and was plagued with vandals, arson fires, and multiple forms of hazardous waste. The hospital had been a public health concern for many years since its closure in 2006.

== Demolition ==
The city of Jeannette never had the money to demolish the decaying building. The estimated cost of demolition was $250,000-$1 million and it was less money for the city to spend $25,000 per year to try and keep up with security and vandals. Finally, in 2014 a request was submitted for a state grant of $1 million to demolish the property. Demolition of the hospital, led by DORE construction out of Michigan, was completed in 2016. Cleanup was expensive and lasted several weeks after.
