= Rosemarie Reed =

American documentary filmmaker and professor

- Born: Brooklyn, New York, U.S.
- Occupations: Director, writer, producer, professor
- Years active: 1986–present

Rosemarie Reed is an American documentary filmmaker. She also served as an adjunct professor at the Borough of Manhattan Community College (BMCC) - City University of New York (CUNY).

== Career ==
Reed began her career at WBAI, a radio station in New York City. After spending a few years as the station manager at WBAI, She shifted into independent radio production before focusing on documentary filmmaking. Her documentaries often explore the narratives of scientists, historical figures, LGBTQ rights, the Holocaust, and the human condition.

Reed's notable works include Widow of the Revolution: The Anna Larina Story (2000), with readings from her book, This I Cannot Forget, read by Vanessa Redgrave. The film examines the life of Anna Larina during the Stalinist purges; The Path to Nuclear Fission: The Story of Lise Meitner and Otto Hahn (2006), narrated by Linda Hunt The film chronicles the discovery of nuclear fission; Conversations with Gorbachev interviews with Mikhail Gorbachev about his presidency, with Stephen F. Cohen, CBS commentator and professor of Russian Studies at Princeton University and New York University, as the interviewer; Out from the Shadows: The Story of Irene Joliot-Curie and Frederic Joliot Curie (2009), narrated by Academy Award winner Julianne Moore, details the lives and scientific achievements of the Nobel laureates; Playing in the FM Band: The Steve Post Story (2022), examining the career of Steve Post, a public radio personality in New York, and Forgetting the Many: The Royal Pardon of Alan Turing (2024), narrated by actor Ben Whishaw, which discusses Turing's contributions to computing and WWII codebreaking, his posthumous pardon for gross indecency, along with interviews with other men accused of gross indecency.

Reed's documentaries have appeared on channels such as PBS, ZDF, Arte and the History Channel. She has received support from organizations such as the Alfred P. Sloan Foundation and the National Science Foundation for projects focusing on science, technology, and economics. In 2010, She was awarded the Hadassah-Brandeis Institute Research Award for My Daughter The Doctor: Jewish Women And the Nobel Prize In Medicine.

== Filmography ==
Year	Title	Contribution	Note
1994	Conversations with Gorbachev	Director and Producer	Documentary
1996	Russia Betrayed? Voices of the Opposition	Director and Producer	Documentary
2000	Widow of the Revolution: The Anna Larina Story	Director and Producer	Documentary
2006	The Path to Nuclear Fission: The Story of Lise Meitner and Otto Hahn	Director and Producer	Documentary
2009	Out from the Shadows: The Story of Irene Joliot-Curie and Frederic Joliot Curie	Director, Writer and Producer	Documentary
2011	Where Birds Never Sang: The Ravensbrueck and Sachsenhausen Concentration Camps	Director and Producer	Documentary Short
2022	Playing in the FM Band: The Steve Post Story	Director and Producer	Documentary
2024	Forgetting the Many: The Royal Pardon of Alan Turing	Director and Producer	Documentary
2025	Witness: Rabbi Jon Cutler Recalls	Director and Producer	Documentary Short
2026	Gisella Perl: I Was a Doctor in Auschwitz	Director and Producer	Documentary (Pre-Production)

=== Selected Radio Productions ===
- Star Wars: with Dr. Michio Kaku (1986)
- Explorations in Science with Dr. Michio Kaku (1986)
- Requiem for a Woman’s Soul (1986)
- Part of My Soul Went With Him (1987)
