= Ernie Pitts =

American gridiron football player (1935–1970)

No. 77
- Positions: Wide receiver, Defensive back

Personal information
- Born: March 8, 1935; Aliquippa, Pennsylvania, U.S.
- Died: September 24, 1970 (aged 35); Denver, Colorado, U.S.
- Listed height: 6 ft 2 in (1.88 m)
- Listed weight: 192 lb (87 kg)

Career information
- College: Denver
- NFL draft: 1957: 8th round, 92nd overall pick

Career history
- 1957–1969: Winnipeg Blue Bombers
- 1970: BC Lions

Awards and highlights
- 4× Grey Cup champion (1958, 1959, 1961, 1962); 5× CFL West All-Star (1957, 1959, 1960, 1966, 1968); Second-team All-American (1956)
- Canadian Football Hall of Fame (Class of 2019)

Ernie Pitts (March 8, 1935 – September 24, 1970) was a Canadian Football League (CFL) wide receiver and defensive back for the Winnipeg Blue Bombers and the BC Lions in a 14-year career in the CFL from 1957 to 1970. He won four Grey Cups with Winnipeg. In August 2019 he was inducted into the Canadian Football League Hall of Fame.

== College ==
Ernie Pitts played intercollegiate baseball and football at the University of Denver.

== Professional career ==
=== Winnipeg Blue Bombers ===
Pitts was a standout wide receiver who also played defensive back for the Winnipeg Blue Bombers from 1957 to 1969. For all those years except the last two, Ken Ploen was at quarterback. Together, along with Jim Van Pelt [1958-59], Pitts and Ploen were major factors in Winnipeg's six Grey Cup appearances (1957, 1958, 1959, 1961, 1962, 1965), including four victories: 1958, 1959, 1961, 1962 and two losses: 1957, 1965. His highest totals in caught passes was 68 in 1959 and 62 in 1962. In 1959, he scored 16 touchdowns. He once caught 5 touchdown passes in one game and scored on a 107-yard touchdown pass play. Evidence of his prowess on defense included 7 interceptions in 1968 and 5 more in 1969.

=== BC Lions ===
Pitts ended his career with the BC Lions in 1970.

== Death ==
Pitts, on September 24, 1970, was fatally shot (by a .38 caliber revolver) in the neck by his estranged wife during a domestic dispute on the porch of their home in Thornton, Colorado. They had six children. She was charged, tried for murder, and, in June 1971, acquitted, mainly for reasons of self-defense of a forcible entry by Ernie Pitts.

=== Family ===
One of Pitts brothers, George E. Pitts (1925–1987), was an influential and longstanding newspaper entertainment columnist, notably with the Pittsburgh Courier. One of his nephews, George Pitts (1951–2017) was a photojournalist.

== See also ==
- List of gridiron football players who died during their careers
