= James Pitts =

James Pitts may refer to:

- James Pitts (VC recipient) (1877–1955), English recipient of the Victoria Cross
- James Pitts (American Patriot) (1712–1776), Massachusetts merchant and American Patriot
- James Pitts (chemist) (1921–2014), American chemist and researcher
- James E. Pitts (born 1964), United States Navy admiral
- James S. Pitts (1847–1914), Newfoundland businessman and politician
- Jim Pitts (1947–2024), member of the Texas House of Representatives
- J.E. Pitts (James Edward Pitts), American poet, songwriter and musician
