= George Pitts (journalist) =

American newspaper journalist (1925–1987)

George E. Pitts
- Born: George Edward Pitts; September 22, 1925; Aliquippa, Pennsylvania, U.S.
- Died: May 14, 1987 (aged 61); Washington, D.C., U.S.
- Resting place: Rock Creek Cemetery; Washington, D.C., U.S.
- Occupation: Newspaper journalist
- Writing career
- Period: 1953–1965
- Subject: Entertainment

George Eddie Pitts (né George Edward Pitts; September 22, 1925 Aliquippa, Pennsylvania – May 14, 1987 Washington, D.C.) was an influential newspaper entertainment journalist and editor – notably, from 1953 to 1964, for the Pittsburgh Courier, but later, for the Chicago Courier (managing editor), and the Chicago American (reporter).

== Career ==
=== U.S. Armed Forces ===
In September 1943, at age 17, Pitts volunteered to train in the U.S. Army Aviation Cadet Corps in Pittsburgh. He entered active service in the U.S. Army Air Corps November 20, 1943, at Keesler Field in Biloxi, Mississippi. Pitts joined the Reserve Officers Training Corps (ROTC) and then competed for a Regular Army commission under the federal Thomason Act. He was honorably discharged March 8, 1946, at Fort Meade, Maryland.

=== Journalism ===
George E. Pitts, Sr., was first a reporter, then entertainment columnist with the Pittsburgh Courier from 1953 to 1964. He was a civil rights advocate and wrote about abolishing segregation, notably in entertainment. As an entertainment editor, Pitts flourished as a prolific jazz columnist. Nat Hentoff, in the 1958 inaugural issue of Jazz Review, singled out Pitts, stating,

"Except for George Pitts in the Pittsburgh Courier, there is little of jazz interest in the Negro press. Once in a while, the Magazine Section of the weekly Afro-American in Baltimore has a feature of interest in fields like gospel singing (for example, the July 12, 1958, issue)."

W. Beverly Carter, Jr. (1921–1982), publisher of the Pittsburgh Courier from 1955 to 1962, became publisher of the Chicago Courier in 1962. Pitts became managing editor of the Chicago Courier in 1964. Later, Pitts was a reporter for the Chicago American.

=== Civil service ===
In 1965, Pitts was appointed Regional Civil Rights Coordinator for the Great Lakes Region of the U.S. Office of Economic Opportunity, headquartered in Chicago, as part of President Lyndon B. Johnson's War on Poverty. The Great Lake Region included Minnesota, Illinois, Michigan, Wisconsin, Ohio, and Indiana.

=== Death ===
George Eddie Pitts died May 14, 1987, in Washington, D.C., and was interred May 19, 1987, there, at Rock Creek Cemetery.

== Family ==
George E. Pitts was married to Phyllis F. Pitts (née Forbes; 1931–2008). They were the parents of the late photojournalist George Pitts, Jr. (1951–2017) and Michael Kevin Pitts. One of George's late brothers, Ernie Pitts (1925–1970), played football in the Canadian Football League. He also played intercollegiate baseball and football for the University of Denver.

== Pittsburgh Courier, selected articles ==
General features, artist profiles, editorials, reviews
- "Flirting With Greatness: 'Cannonball' Really Whales on Tenor Sax," Vol. 47, No. 11, March 17, 1956
- "Big Jay McNeely – The Blowinist Cat Alive" (see Jay McNeely), September 29, 1956, p. 21
- "Agents and Entertainers at Fault: Segregated Audiences Should Be Abolished," No. 48, No. 9, March 2, 1957, p. 22 (the article singled out Louis Armstrong) (accessible via Newspapers.com at www.newspapers.com/image/40824383)
- "Patti Austin Show Biz Veteran at Age of 9," Vol. 51, No. 21, May 21, 1960, p. 24

George E. Pitts:
- "Ray Charles Explains His 'Soul' Singing," Vol. 51, No. 11, March 14, 1959, p. 22
- "Bigots Should Be Kept Off Radio and TV" September 26, 1959, p. 22
- "Negro Theatrical Writers Slashed by Sports Scribe," October 3, 1959, p. 3
- "Negro Musicians, Do They Really Want to Merge?" Vol. 51, No. 49, December 5, 1959 (accessible via Newspapers.com at www.newspapers.com/image/40017810)
- "Give Brubeck Credit for a Slap at Bias," Vol. 51, No. 7, February 13, 1960, p. 22

Theatrical Roundup:
- "A Tribute to Duke Ellington," April 5, 1956, p. 24

Rock 'n' Roll Department: "Bits About 'Em"
- "Bob Harrison", Vol. 47, No. 46, November 17, 1956, p. 26
  Re: Elvis Presley's derivative style – quoting publisher Bob Harrison: "Negro associates taught him a lot about his present style of singing."

Around the Theatrical World:
- "Are Negroes Born With More Rhythm Than Whites?" Vol. 48, No. 28, July 13, 1957, p. 22 (accessible via Newspapers.com at www.newspapers.com/image/40850036)
- "Comparison of World's Best Two Drummers" (Max Roach and Art Blakey), April 8, 1958
- "Are Russians Afraid of American Jazz?" May 31, 1958, p. 23

George E. Pitts Sez ...
- "Cannonball Blasts Hurok Who Attacked Jazz" (see Cannonball Adderley and Sol Hurok), May 28, 1960, p. 33
- "Harry Belafonte in Thick of Rights Fight," Vol. 51, No. 24, June 11, 1960, p. 23
- "Belafonte Blasts 'Parlor Liberals'" (see Harry Belafonte), August 20, 1960, p. 23
- "Are White Musicians Discrimination Victims?" Vol. 51, No. 41, October 8, 1960, p. 22 (accessible via Newspapers.com at www.newspapers.com/image/40046943)
- "Should Artists Express Political Views?" Vol. 51, No. 43, October 22, 1960, p. 22 (accessible via Newspapers.com at www.newspapers.com/image/40047022)
- "Lean Times Plague Pittsburgh Clubs," Vol. 51, No. 45, November 5, 1960, p. 24
- "Negro Musicians Accused of Discrimination," Vol. 51, No. 46, November 12, 1960, p. 23 (accessible via Newspapers.com at www.newspapers.com/image/40047140)
- "Fuss Over Interracial Marriages Ridiculous," Vol. 51, No. 48, November 26, 1960, p. 23
- "Writer Blasts Television Color Line," Vol. 51, No. 51, December 17, 1960, p. 23
- "Jazzman Says Colleges are Jazz Minded," Vol. 52, No. 9, March 4, 1961, Section 2, p. 21 (accessible via Newspapers.com at www.newspapers.com/image/40272985)
- "Comedian Dick Gregory Making It Big" (re: Dick Gregory), Vol. 52, No. 11, March 18, 1961, p. Section 2, p. 22 (accessible via Newspapers.com at www.newspapers.com/image/40273065)
- "Rhythm and Blues Now Strong Musical Force," Vol. 52, No. 37, September 16, 1961, Section 2, p. 22 (accessible via Newspapers.com at www.newspapers.com/image/40274125)
- "Disc Payola Still Riding High," Vol. 53, No. 2, January 13, 1962, Section 2, p. 20 (accessible via Newspapers.com at www.newspapers.com/image/40828942)
- "Jail, Freedom or Help for Ray Charles," Vol. 53, No. 4, January 27, 1962, Section 2, p. 20 (accessible via Newspapers.com at www.newspapers.com/image/40832613)
- "Negroes Gaining Better Television Roles," March 3, 1962, Vol. 53, No. 9, Section 2, p. 22 (accessible via Newspapers.com at www.newspapers.com/image/40841393)
- "Nation's Night Club Business Sagging," Vol. 53, No. 12, March 24, 1962, Section2, p. 22 (accessible via Newspapers.com at www.newspapers.com/image/40845912)
- "Slappy White Dislikes Offensive Comedy," Vol. 53, No. 19, May 12, 1962, Section 2, p. 22 (accessible via Newspapers.com at www.newspapers.com/image/40854479)
- "Some Russians Dug Goodman, Some Didn't," Vol. 53, No. 24, June 16, 1962, Section 2, p. 17 (accessible via Newspapers.com at www.newspapers.com/image/40857486)
- "Did US Jazz Come From Africa or Europe?" Vol. 53, No. 29, July 21, 1962, p. Section 2, p. 15 (accessible via Newspapers.com at www.newspapers.com/image/40859854)

Survey
- "Who Wants Intermarriage?" by Pitts and Harold L. Keith, August 16, 1958, p. 3

Magazine Section
- "Who Wants Intermarriage? Intermarriage Favored, But Non-Skilled Females Object," September 6, 1958
