= Topless (disambiguation) =

Topless is where a woman's breasts are exposed.

Topless may also refer to:

- "Topless", a song by Breaking Benjamin from the 2006 album Phobia
- "Topless", a song by Eminem with Dr Dre and Nas
- Topless (film), a 2008 Japanese film
- Topless (play), by Miles Tredinnick, 1999
- La Mouette Topless, French hang glider design

== See also ==
- Topfreedom, a cultural and political movement for toplessness
