= The Pit =

The Pit may refer to:

== Places ==
- The Pit, a commonly used name for a mosh pit
- The Pit (arena), the main indoor arena at the University of New Mexico
- The Pit (memorial), "Яма" the Holocaust memorial in Minsk, Belarus
- Elder 'The Pit' Stadium, the football stadium at Elder High School in Cincinnati, Ohio
- McArthur Court, also called "The Pit", an arena at the University of Oregon
- Peoples Improv Theater, also referred to as "The PIT", a New York City theatre specializing in improvisational and sketch comedy
- The Pit, a 200-seat studio theatre at the Barbican Arts Centre in the City of London
- The Pit, a common nickname for the underground war room in the fortified compound of the Israeli Defense Ministry
- The Pit, a small public performance area in Harvard Square, Cambridge, Massachusetts
- The Pit, a popular study spot in the lower level of the library at the Indiana University Maurer School of Law
- The Pit, the central courtyard of the University of North Carolina at Chapel Hill

== Arts, entertainment, and media ==
=== Fictional places ===
- The Pit (G.I. Joe), the secret headquarters of the fictional G.I. Joe in Marvel comics
- The Pit, a dangerous fighting arena featured and made famous in the Mortal Kombat video games
- The Pit, the Barksdale Organization's nickname for the low-rise building complex where D'Angelo's crew sold drugs, in The Wire

=== Films ===
- The Pit (1981 film), a Canadian horror film also known as Teddy
- The Pit (2020 film), a Latvian drama film

=== Gaming ===
- The Pit (video game), a 1981 arcade game
- Sword of the Stars: The Pit, a 2013 space rogue computer game by Kerberos Productions

=== Literature ===
- The Pit (Judge Dredd story)
- The Pit (Norris novel), a 1903 book by Frank Norris
- The Pit (Penswick novel), a Doctor Who tie-in novel
- The Pit: A Group Encounter Defiled, a 1972 book about mind dynamics, leadership dynamics, and holiday magic
- The Pit and the Pendulum, a 1842 short horror story by Edgar Allan Poe
- Yama: The Pit, a 1905–1915 novel by Aleksandr Kuprin

=== Other uses in arts, entertainment, and media ===
- "The Pit" (song), a 2012 single by Silversun Pickups from Neck of the Woods
- "The Pit" (Adventure Time)
- "The Pit" (Star Wars: Visions)
- "The Pit", an episode in the second season of the television series The Invaders, 1967–1968
- Orchestra pit, a lowered area in front of the stage that holds musicians who accompany the performers on stage
- A recording studio at the Sausalito location of the Record Plant

== Other uses ==
- The Pit (mixed martial arts) training camp
- The Pit, a forum on Ultimate Guitar Archive

== See also ==
- Abyss (religion), the bottomless pit, which may lead to the underworld or hell
- The Pitt, an American television series
- The Pitt, an expansion pack to the 2008 game Fallout 3
- Pit (disambiguation)
