= Bottomless pit =

Bottomless pit may refer to:

- Bottomless pit (Bible), a place where demons are imprisoned
- Bottomless Pit (band), an indie rock band from Chicago, Illinois
- Bottomless Pit (album), a 2016 album by Death Grips
- Bottomless pit (video gaming), a level hazard in video games
- "Bottomless Pit!", an episode of Gravity Falls

== See also ==
- Abyss (disambiguation)
- Pit (disambiguation)
