= John Pitt =

John Pitt may refer to:

== Politicians ==
- John Pitt (Bridgwater MP) (1421–1435), English Member of Parliament
- John Pitt (Bridport MP) (c.1546–1626), English Member of Parliament
- John Pitt (of Crow Hall) (c.1673 – 1731), British Member of Parliament for St Ives and Stockbridge, probably son of George Pitt of Strathfieldsaye (d. 1694)
- John Pitt (colonel) (c.1698 – 1754), British Member of Parliament and Governor of Bermuda
- John Pitt (of Encombe) (1704 – 1787), British Member of Parliament for Dorchester and Wareham and Lord of Trade and the Admiralty
- John Pitt (attorney) (c.1727 – 1805), British Member of Parliament for Gloucester
- John Pitt (died 1731), British Member of Parliament for Stockbridge and Gloucester
- John Pitt, 2nd Earl of Chatham (1756 – 1835) British statesman, brother of William Pitt the Younger
- John R. Pitt (1885–1971), Canadian politician

== Others ==
- John Pitt (warden), Warden of Wadham College, Oxford 16??-1648, see John Wilkins
- John Pitt (cricketer) (born 1939), English cricketer
- Jack Pitt, footballer
- John I. Pitt (1937–2022), Australian mycologist

== See also ==
- John Pitts (disambiguation)
