= Bob Fass =

American radio personality (1933–2021)

- Born: Robert Morton Fass; June 29, 1933; Brooklyn, New York, U.S.
- Died: April 24, 2021 (aged 87); Monroe, North Carolina, U.S.
- Education: Syracuse University (B.A., 1955)
- Occupations: radio presenter, journalist, actor
- Known for: Radio Unnameable broadcast radio program
- Spouse(s): Bridget Potter (divorced), Catherine Revland (common law marriage), Lynnie Tofte Fass

Robert Morton Fass (June 29, 1933 – April 24, 2021) was an American radio personality and pioneer of free-form radio, who broadcast in the New York region for over 50 years. Fass's program, Radio Unnamable, aired in some form from 1963 until his death primarily on WBAI, a radio station operating out of New York City.

== Early years ==
Robert Morton Fass was born June 29, 1933, and grew up in Brooklyn, New York. He graduated from Syracuse University in 1955. When he went into the army in 1956, he started a theater at Fort Bragg, North Carolina. Fass received a scholarship to study acting with Sandy Meisner and Sydney Pollack at the Neighborhood Playhouse and was also a member of Stella Adler's workshop.

He appeared on stage in Brendan Behan's The Hostage at Circle in the Square, The Execution of Private Slovik with Dustin Hoffman, and The Man with the Golden Arm at the Cherry Lane, among other New York productions. In 1960, he took over the role of the warden in the legendary off-Broadway production of Threepenny Opera with Lotte Lenya. Over the next two years, he played a variety of roles in the show, also acting as assistant stage manager.

In 1963, he began working at WBAI, operated by the Pacifica Foundation. Novelist and poet Richard Elman, a friend of Fass's from high school, who was producing programs for the station's Drama & Literature Department, helped Fass get a job as an announcer. He then was given the midnight to dawn time block to use as he wished.

== Radio Unnamable ==
The Unnamable by Samuel Beckett, which Fass was reading at the time, gave the show its title. His signature greeting, "Good morning, cabal," came from a listener. "I wanted a sign-on line, like William B. Williams "Good morning, world," says Fass.

Someone sent in a postcard suggesting, "Good morning, cabal." I looked it up in the dictionary and discovered that the word, cabal, comes from "horse." Originally, people met on horseback at night with their identities concealed-even from each other—to plot or plan something subversive. And I thought, that's it: "Good morning, cabal."

=== Show content ===
The show was described as a free-form show often with random phone calls and political discussion."

Fass collaborated with Gerd Stern and Michael Callahan's media collective, USCO, which had produced sound fields for Timothy Leary's Fillmore East shows, then began creating mixes on the air.

=== Response to the show ===
Ralph Engleman, in his book, Public Radio & TV in America: A Political History, cites Fass as "the first to develop the full potential of free-form radio and make it a major vehicle of the counterculture." and Wavy Gravy refers to him as "the father of freeform radio."

He also plays a major role in Marc Fisher's book, Something In The Air, which covers radio's impact in the post-TV years. The Washington Post columnist describes how the "I'm mad as hell and I'm not going to take it any more!" scene in the film, Network, grew out of an actual incident when WOR's Jean Shepherd exhorted his listeners to throw open their windows, stick out their heads, and shout, "Excelsior!", then he goes on to write "Radio Unnameable would inspire a monsoon of musical, sexual, pharmacological, political, and social change"

== "Midwife to a Movement" ==
=== Human Fly-In ===
On February 11, 1967, three thousand people showed up at midnight "on the coldest day of the year", for a "Fly-In" at John F. Kennedy Airport in New York City, to play guitar and hang out at the International Arrivals Terminal. Fass told author Jay Sand, "that was the first inkling I had that there were so many people and that they wanted so much to get together." "Something about this electronic thing - this radio station - makes it possible to listen to other people like themselves and they get the idea they aren't alone."

=== Sweep In ===
Fass and his friends then announced plans for a Sweep In which would be held on April 8, 1967, and invited the audience to join them in cleaning up Krassner's garbage-strewn block; 7th Street between Avenue D and Avenue C. Word of the upcoming spring-cleaning eventually reached New York's Sanitation Department. City trucks were dispatched in the early hours to clean the block, from top to bottom, considered to be an unusual occurrence in the area. However, Fass's listeners arrived armed with brooms, mops, sponges and cleaning solutions, moved down to 3rd Street and started scrubbing there. The New York Times reported a sizeable group of participants were kids who came in from Westchester County and Long Island.

=== Yippies ===
The Yippies! got worldwide attention that October when they applied for permission to levitate the Pentagon during a massive anti-Vietnam War demonstration that attracted 50,000 to Washington, D.C. Fass can be heard on tapes of the event (along with Ed Sanders of the rock group The Fugs, and Mountain Girl) chanting, "out demons, out!" as they attempt to exorcize the evil spirits in the Pentagon.

=== Yip In at Grand Central ===
The Yippies decided to hold a Yip In at Grand Central Terminal in New York in March 1968. While the reunion started pleasantly, some attendees engaged in violent behaviors. Radio Unnameable broadcast eyewitness accounts from the scene and spoke to Abbie Hoffman, who was being treated at Bellevue Hospital.

== The 1970s onward ==
Fass continued to do his show as New York City and WBAI went through radical changes. In the 1970s, the Movement split into factions and new program directors and station managers began to alter the thrust of the programming, apportioning blocks of airtime to feminists, gay rights activists, African-Americans, Hispanic-Americans, Native Americans, and other interest groups. Fass and many others felt this approach was the very antithesis of the personal character of WBAI.

=== Station takeover and lock-out ===
In 1977, Fass found himself at the forefront of a power struggle for the future of the station. He participated in a staff attempt to form a union. Management accused him of "living in the past" and ordered him not to discuss the station's internal business on the air. The stand off ended with some staff members seizing control of WBAI's transmitter at the Empire State Building, while others (including Fass) remained barricaded in the studios, broadcasting until the phone lines were cut and the police arrived to haul them away.

New York City's free speech station padlocked the front door and suspended broadcasting for 35 days. Fass was banned for five years, during which he returned to stage acting, did a guest residency at WFMU in New Jersey, and campaigned to return to WBAI.

=== Reinstatement ===
Fass was reinstated in 1982.

In the mid-1980s, Fass was nearly homeless. AJ Weberman rented a truck for Fass and a large storage unit to hold his archives, paid in advance for many years.

Fass was last paid for his radio time in 1977. Musicians like Dave Bromberg, and other radio personalities such as Steve Post, Larry Josephson, and Vin Scelsa, and have spoken of his generosity with his time. Listeners have made donations to his retirement fund.

By 2006, Fass's time on WBAI had been reduced to one night a week. He continued to host in that single weekly overnight time slot. As of 2016, the show was also being heard on a small syndication network, at the time flagshipped at WFTE in Mount Cobb, Pennsylvania (which went out of business later that year) and hosted from his home due to declining health.

On October 4, 2019, WBAI was illegally seized by a minority faction of Pacifica's board without authorization, and canceled all of WBAI's original programming including Fass's show, replacing it with canned programs from California. This lasted a month before it could be reversed through court action and Radio Unnameable was restored.

== Notable guests ==
Fass remembered his very first guest on the air was Paul Krassner, editor of The Realist, soon followed by Zen poet D.A. Levy. Krassner became a regular, along with Timothy Leary, Wavy Gravy, (aka comedian Hugh Romney), filmmaker Robert Downey, David Amram, comic actor and writer, Marshall Efron, the club performer, Brother Theodore, and Kinky Friedman (years before he began writing mystery stories and took up politics).

Notable guests include investigative reporter Mae Brussell, Abbie Hoffman commenting on the Chicago Seven trial, a planning session for the Central Park Be-In, and the first radio appearance of Phoebe Snow. The show has featured the work, and the first performances of Arlo Guthrie's "Alice's Restaurant" and Jerry Jeff Walker's "Mr. Bojangles."

Allen Ginsberg, Peter Orlovsky, and Gregory Corso, turned up multiple times. Over the course of the years, activist attorney Flo Kennedy kept listeners abreast of the latest injustices in America's court system. Steve Ben Israel and Judith Malina of the Living Theater, actor Rip Torn (and more recently his son, director Tony Torn), Ed Sanders, Tuli Kupferberg, and the rest of The Fugs, all made themselves comfortable on Fass's show. Abbie Hoffman, the former civil rights organizer turned political provocateur appeared regularly during the tumultuous years from 1968 to 1973.

=== Musicians ===
A long list of musicians have appeared on Radio Unnameable, including Townes Van Zandt, David Peel, Richie Havens, Jose Feliciano, Joni Mitchell, The Fugs, Karen Dalton, Patti Smith and Phil Ochs (parodying "Positively 4th Street"; half pretending a comic competition with Bob Dylan, but later telling disapproving callers that it was Dylan's right to play with an electric guitar and a band behind him). The Incredible String Band came over from England with their manager, Joe Boyd, Happy and Artie Traum often stopped by before heading back to Woodstock.

Other performers include Taj Mahal, Paul Siebel, Muddy Waters, Otis Spann, Skip James, Rosalie Sorrels, Tiny Tim, Jake & the Family Jewels, Cat Mother & the All Night Newsboys, Melanie, Penny Arcade, Rambling Jack Elliot, Tom Rapp and Pearls before Swine, Frank Zappa, Jeremy Steig, The Holy Modal Rounders, Sis Cunningham and Sammy Walker.

=== Bob Dylan ===
Fass met Dylan before he began his radio career, double dating with Carla Rotolo, one-time stage manager of The Hostage, and her sister, Suze, who was Dylan's girlfriend. (Note: And somehow, when she said, "What are you looking at?" I said, "Well, I’m not sure why, but you." And she said, "Well, you should see my sister." Her sister was Suze Rotolo, who was Bob Dylan’s very best live-in roommate friend at the time. And, you know, I was more than a little interested. And after a couple of weeks, I asked her to, you know, have a cup of coffee with me. And she said, "Alright." And we had the cup of coffee, and I got to know her a little better. And she said, "Do you think that I’m good looking? You should see my sister. And you know who her" — this was on the downlow — "boyfriend is?" And I said, "No." And she said, "Dylan." I said, "The poet?" She said, "No." I said, "Who?" She said, "Bob Dylan." I said, "Bob?" She said, "Yeah. Well, that’s not really his — but we’ll tell you more about it later.")

We went out to dinner in the Village and played poker at Dylan's apartment over The Music Inn on W. 4th Street," Fass remembers. "When I started the show, he listened and occasionally I could squeeze a suggestion out of him. He turned me on to Lightnin' Hopkins."

Dylan's first appearance on radio was on Radio Unnameable doing comic improvs with Suze Rotolo and John Herald in 1963. Listeners also got a preview of his forthcoming album, Freewheelin'. In 1966, in the midst of recording Blonde on Blonde, he returned to Radio Unnameable, taking calls from listeners. When Dylan's crusading anthem, Hurricane, came out in the mid 1970s, Fass played it all night for five nights in a row and in 1986, when Dylan turned 45, Fass organized a 45-hour marathon of his music for WBAI.

== Influence ==
In his book about life at WBAI, Playing in the FM Band, Steve Post describes Fass as "a gigantic man with receding blond hair and thick black-rimmed glasses, with hands so huge they appeared to dominate his enormous frame. His voice, soft and gentle, which I heard coming from the office monitors seemed somehow detached from his body." Post, who began as WBAI's bookkeeper before hosting a program of his own, The Outside, describes how Fass took him under "his ample wing" and allowed him to watch him at work, teaching him what he knew, demystifying the whole process.

Marc Fisher wrote that "some of the voices that would break the last taboos in talk radio a generation later were in [Fass's] audience."

== Legacy ==
In 2005, attorney Neil Fabricant, President Emeritus of the School of Social Policy at GWU, organized a rent party for Fass. "The right wing has spent billions of dollars to revise the history of an era and to distort the collective memory," Fabricant says. He suggests that restoring and properly archiving the 45 years of Bob Fass's program "would be a giant first step in reclaiming that history."

A documentary film about Fass and the show, also named Radio Unnameable, aired on the World Channel series America ReFramed on September 17, 2013.

80 hours of Radio Unnameable have been acquired and are currently available at the Museum of Television and Radio in New York.

Good Evening Cabal, a weekly show on a Florida-based community FM station, is named as a tribute to Bob Fass by its host, Curt Werner, who as a Brooklyn teenager listened to Fass in the 1960s on WBAI. The program, which features music from the 1960s and 1970s, and live interviews with artists and writers from that era, has been on the air for four years on WSLR 96.5 LPFM in Sarasota, Florida. Fass himself appeared as a guest on the show in 2007.

== Broadcast samples ==
The internet archive has available a sound recording (in various formats) of a program "featuring live interviews with Jerry Rubin, Abbie Hoffman, and Phil Ochs": Bob Fass in Chicago - August 27, 1968

== Death ==
Fass's death was announced via the WBAI Twitter account: "Bob Fass, Legendary Icon, the Father of Free Form Radio who had a program and home @WBAI since 1963, passed away peacefully April 24, 2021. He was 87 years old. We love you Bob. Rest in Peace." Fass died of longstanding congestive heart failure as well as COVID-19.

WBAI has run reruns of Radio Unnameable segments in Fass's former time slot since his death.

== See also ==
- Timeline of 1960s counterculture
- WBAI
- Yippies

== Sources ==
- Playing in the FM Band: A personal account of free radio – Steve Post – Viking Press, 1974, ISBN 0-670-55927-X
- "A Radio Station with Real Hair, Sweat, and Body Odor" – The New York Times, Susan Braudy; September 17, 1972; Sunday Magazine
- "Insurgent Staff Members Take Over WBAI In Coup" – The New York Times, Robert D. McFadden; February 12, 1977
- Sand, Jay. "THE RADIO WAVES UNNAMEABLE:." 24 Jan. 1996. 28 Aug. 2006
- Breslin, Jimmy. "BETWEEN EVANGELIST & a ROCK SHOW, JUSTICE." NY Daily News 29 October 1985.
- Engleman, Ralph. Public Radio & TV in America: a Political History. Thousand Oaks, CA: Sage Publications, 1996. p. 57
- Fisher, Marc. Something in the Air. New York, NY: Random House, 2007. pp. 124–157 Something in the Air: Radio, Rock, and the Revolution that Shaped a Generation
- Platzer, David "Some Radio Unnameable Nights with Bob Dylan", The London Magazine, December 2004/January 2005
- "On Air, a Broadcaster and a Killer Shared a Platform" New York Times, February 24, 2008
