= George Pitt =

George Pitt may refer to:

== Politics ==
- George Pitt (died 1694) (1625–1694), British member of parliament for Wareham
- George Pitt (died 1735) (1663–1735), British member of parliament for Hampshire, Stockbridge and Old Sarum
- George Pitt (died 1745), British member of parliament for Wareham and Dorset
- George Morton Pitt (1693–1756), administrator of India and later British member of parliament for Pontefract
- George Pitt, 1st Baron Rivers (1721–1803), British diplomat and politician
- George Pitt, 2nd Baron Rivers (1751–1828), British politician
- George Dean Pitt (1772 or 1781–1851), British soldier and lieutenant-governor of the former New Zealand Province of New Ulster
- George Pitt (Australian politician) (1872–1932)

== Other ==
- George Dibdin Pitt (1795–1855), British dramatist
- George Cecil Pitt (1767–1820), British musician and father of George Dibdin Pitt
