= Carwyn Jones (rugby union) =

Wales rugby union player

- Born: 23 February 1993 (age 33) Haverfordwest
- Notable relative: Llewelyn Jones (twin brother)

Rugby union career
- Position: Second row
- Current team: RC Vannes
Senior career
Years	Team	Apps	(Points)
2013-14	Carmarthen Quins RFC	2	(0)
2015-17	Ealing Trailfinders	27	(0)
2017-	RC Vannes	64	(5)
International career
Years	Team	Apps	(Points)
2013	Wales U20	8	(5)

Carwyn Jones (born 23 February 1993) is a Welsh rugby union player. He plays for Rugby Club Vannes in the French D12 league. He is the brother of Llewelyn Jones, a professional rugby player who represented Wales U18, Scarlets, Ealing, Saracens, Nottingham and Ampthill.

== Career ==
From Haverfordwest, and a former member of the Scarlets academy, Jones was part of the Wales Under-20s side that reached the Junior World Championship final in 2013, appearing alongside the likes of Ellis Jenkins, Elliot Dee, Rhodri Williams, and Hallam Amos amongst others, before losing 23–15 to an England side in the final that contained the likes of future Welsh international Ross Moriarty as well as future England internationals Jack Nowell, Anthony Watson, Henry Slade, and Luke Cowan-Dickie. Jones appeared for Carmarthen Quins before moving to London to play for the Ealing Trailfinders where he played in the second row alongside his twin brother Llewelyn Jones. A move to Brittany in France with RC Vannes followed in 2017.
