= Llewelyn Jones =

Nigerian rugby union player

Llewelyn Jones (born 23 February 1993) is a Welsh rugby player.

From Haverfordwest he was a member of the Scarlets Academy and made his debut in senior rugby for Llandovery. He made his debut for Ealing alongside his twin brother Carwyn Jones in the 2014–15 season. He can play in the second row, flank or number 8. He moved to Nottingham R.F.C. and then to Ampthill RUFC for whom he made his debut in February 2021. He also had a spell on loan at Saracens RFC in 2021.
