= Pitts Sanborn =

American journalist

- Born: John Pitts Sanborn Jr. October 19, 1879; Port Huron, Michigan, US
- Died: March 7, 1941 (aged 61); New York, New York, US
- Occupations: Writer, critic

John Pitts Sanborn Jr. (October 19, 1879 – March 7, 1941) was an American writer and critic.

== Biography ==
John Pitts Sanborn was born in Port Huron, Michigan on October 19, 1879, the son of John Pitts Sanborn and Mary Wastell. He dropped the "John" for most of his professional career.

After graduating Harvard in 1900, he established himself as a music critic, writing for the New York Globe, New York Mail and finally New York World-Telegram. As a poet he was published in Trend, for which he served as an editorial staffer beginning in 1914. As a novelist, his 1929 novel Prima Donna was called by one New York Times critic "an amazing achievement; nothing quite like it has been done in this country before." He went on to put Sanborn in the same league as Willa Cather, Edith Wharton and Thornton Wilder. Sanborn was remarked upon as one of the great originals of 1920s-1930s culture. Sanborn's wealth of connections in intellectual and cultural circles included Van Wyck Brooks, Rosa Ponselle, Mark Van Doren and Llewelyn Jones.

His friendship with Wallace Stevens (whom he met at Harvard) had a great influence on Stevens' interest in music and thus his poetry. He was a good friend and sometimes lover of Carl Van Vechten, whom he convinced to assume the editorship of Trend. He was also a radio commentator for the Philadelphia Orchestra.

Sanborn died at 61 of an apparent heart attack in his Greenwich Village apartment on March 7, 1941, a few hours after he had attended a performance at the Metropolitan Opera House. He had just completed the first paragraph of his review.

== Selected publications ==
- "Mortality", The Harvard Advocate
- Vie De Bordeaux. 1916. Nicholas L. Brown, Philadelphia.
- "Anatole France-The Host." November 5, 1924. The Nation, page 489
- "A Note on Gluck" December 10, 1924. The Nation, page 661
- "Puccini and Faure." December 24, 1924. The Nation, page 714
- Prima Donna. 1929. The Book League of America. 2 vols.;
- Greek Night. 1933. Lincoln Mac Veagh/Dial Press, New York
- Metropolitan Book of Opera. 1937
- Beethoven and His Nine Symphonies. 1939. Philharmonic-Symphony Society of New York
- Brahms and Some of His Works. 1940. Philharmonic-Symphony Society of New York
