= Steve Post =

Radio personality (1944–2014)

Steve Post (20 March 1944 – 3 August 2014) was an American freeform radio artist and the author of Playing in the FM Band.

== Early life ==
Post, born in the Bronx, became fascinated by radio at about the age of 8 or 10, recording 'broadcasts' on his father's Webcor tape recorder, using names such as Paige Turner. Upon his mother's death of cancer, when Post was 10, he was sent for a time to a boarding school in New Jersey. An indifferent student, by his own account, he eventually graduated from DeWitt Clinton High School.

== Career ==
Post was a pioneer and a trailblazer in freeform radio at WBAI-FM in New York in the late 1960s and early 1970s. Bob Fass, drawing his inspiration from Jean Shepherd, initially transformed and redefined the form and its possibilities, and Fass, Post, and Larry Josephson, a sort of informal, free-floating, quasi-magical creative triumvirate, then pushed the possibilities significantly further in the artistic, cultural, and political turmoil of the time.

Post was, ‘a legendary New York broadcaster’ who, through his years first at WBAI and then at WNYC, was a ‘wry, one-of-a-kind’ personality', a ‘creative genius’ who showed ‘extreme personal courage’, who presented a ‘combination of warmth, bitterness, intelligence, mordant humor, and brilliantly on-target observations’, who ‘didn’t care about fairness, objectivity, balance, the canons of journalism’, who ‘just said whatever the hell came into his mind’, and who formed a deep ‘personal connection… with… listeners scattered around the New York area.’

Post's style was at the core wry, witty, and sardonic – ‘curmudgeonly’. If Will Rogers had famously said that he never met a man he didn't like, Post said no such thing – indeed, he quoted Hobbes as an influence, saying ‘I believe people are essentially brutal, murderous, lying bastards who put on masks of civility to make society work.’

Post, who was 'the undisputed king of on-air fund raising', 'raised millions for public radio.'

He also formed an extraordinarily close, seemingly personal, link with his listeners. 'In a radio age when personality means rant, hysteria, terminal adolescence and unrelieved, unbelievable perkiness, Post is a person. He's depressed. He kvetches. He whines.' His resonant voice, his skill, his talent, his connection with his listeners, meant that 'as is true with some of the best radio people', his fans had the sense that 'they were the only one or members of a very small group.'

In the course of his on-air career, Post was host/producer of:

- The Outside – WBAI
- Room 101 – WBAI
- Morning Music – WNYC
- The No Show – WNYC

Post lived with his wife of 38 years, Laura Rosenberg, on New York's Upper West Side.

Post, who presented '...a quirky combination of music and commentary that defied almost every programing rule of radio', and who was '... one of New York Radio's all-time great contrarians...' died 3 August 2014, age 70.

== Bibliography ==
- Playing in the FM Band: A personal account of free radio – Viking Press, 1974, ISBN 0-670-55927-X
- Playing in the FM Band: The Steve Post Story is a 90' documentary directed by Rosemarie Reed and produced by Caryl Ratner released in March 2022
