= Milton Pitts =

American barber (1912–1994)

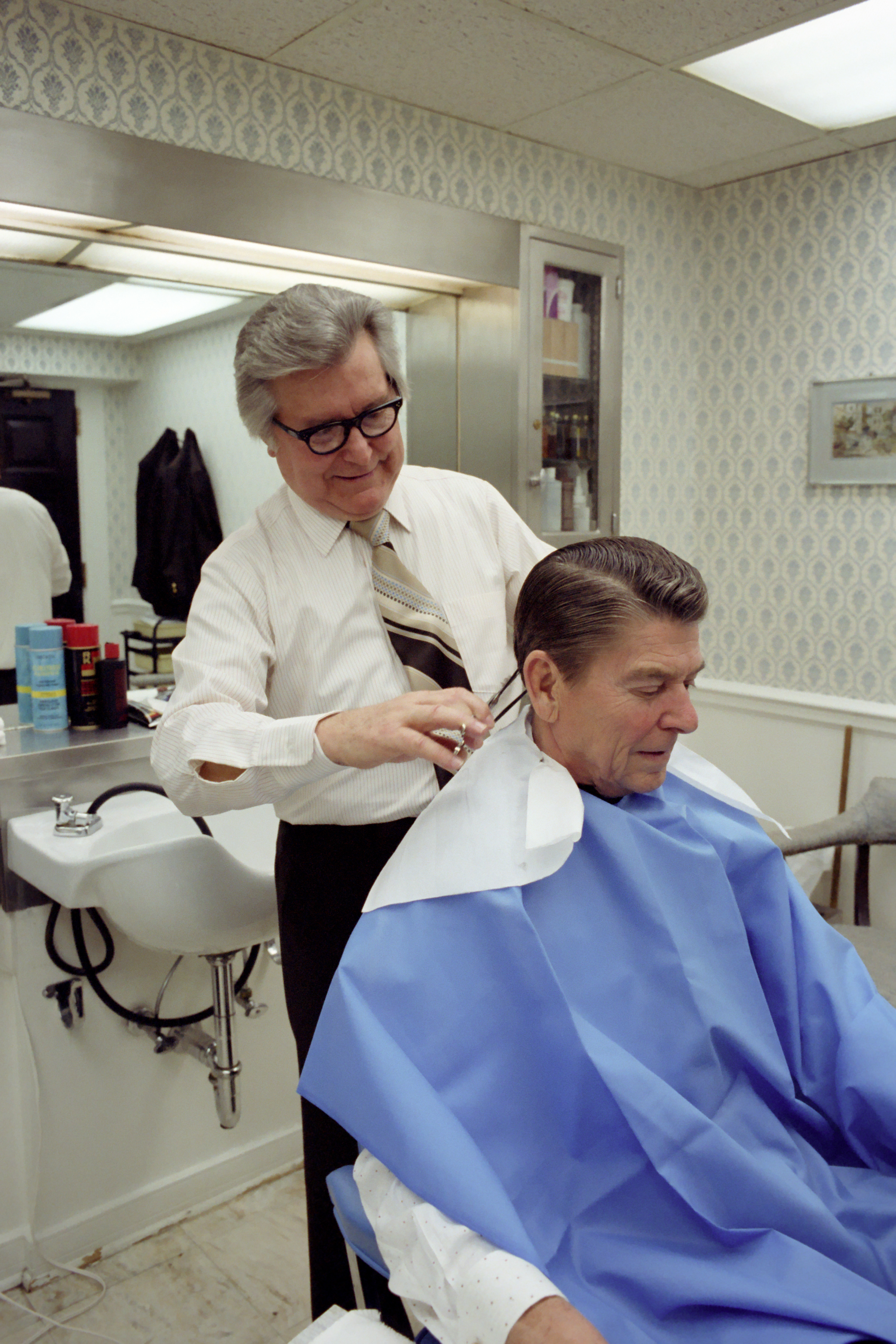
- Milton Pitts cutting Ronald Reagan's hair
- Born: July 4, 1912; Greenville, South Carolina, U.S.
- Died: December 25, 1994 (aged 82); Washington, D.C., U.S.
- Known for: Barber to U.S. presidents

Milton Pitts (4 July 1912 – 25 December 1994) was the White House barber for Republican U.S. Presidents Richard Nixon, Gerald Ford, Ronald Reagan, and George H. W. Bush.

While Pitts was a Republican, he always maintained that "my scissors are neither Republican nor Democrat," and he counted Democratic Senator George McGovern among his clients. Democratic President Jimmy Carter did not use Pitts, though, and instead brought Mr. Pitts partner, Ismael Rodriguez. President Reagan's Chief of Staff James Baker dismissed two hair stylists in July 1982 and Pitts again became the sole White House barber.

During his years in the White House, Pitts won acclaim as "Washington's most famous barber." He appeared on Late Night with David Letterman on May 24, 1982. His twentieth anniversary celebration in 1985 was attended by numerous dignitaries including President Reagan, Defense Secretary Caspar Weinberger, Secretary of State George Shultz and Attorney General Edwin Meese.

Pitts regularly gave his clients advice, both fashion and political, and was well known for speaking frankly: he once "suggested that Richard Nixon do something about his nose and told Gerald Ford his ties were too loud." When President Bill Clinton received a $200 haircut from the Beverly Hills stylist Cristophe, Pitts criticized Clinton and said the price amounted to "showmanship" on the part of the barber. In the years after he left the White House, Pitts typically charged $25 for a haircut at his shop in the Sheraton-Carlton Hotel.
