= Pit Schubert =

German author and mountain climber (1935–2024)

- Born: 2 December 1935; Breslau, Gau Silesia, Germany
- Died: 28 February 2024 (aged 88)
- Occupations: Author, climber and mountaineer
- Writing career
- Genre: Non-fiction
- Notable work: Modern Felstechnik

Pit Schubert (2 December 1935 – 28 February 2024) was a German non-fiction author, climber, and mountaineer. He was the founder and former head of the safety commission of the German Alpine Club (DAV).

== Life and career ==
Schubert was born in Breslau. He started climbing and mountaineering at the age of 17. He became known for both his first ascents and his adherence to alpine doctrines.

Schubert was a qualified engineer, and worked for approximately 15 years in the aerospace industry. In 1968, he was a founding member of the DAV Safety Group, which he chaired until retiring in 2000. He was also president of the UIAA Safety Commission. He worked to standardize climbing equipment, prevented innumerable accidents, and he stated that "At that time man was making the first flight to the moon a reality, but we were still using ice axes with wooden shafts – which could break on the first use on the ice – so a lot of things were waiting to be done.”

Schubert died on 28 February 2024, at the age of 88.

== First ascents ==
- 1967: Piz Ciavazes, South Wall, Via Schubert (VI+, 220 m), Sellagruppe, Dolomites
- 1968: Guglia di Brenta, SW-edge, Schubert / Werner (VI, 380 m), Brenta group, Dolomites
- 1969: First ascent of the Roc Noir (Khangsar Kang, 7485 m), Karakorum
- 1975: Fleischbank, Neue Ostwand, Pohlke / Schubert (VIII, 360 m), Kaisergebirge
- 1976: First ascent of the south flank of Annapurna IV (7525 m), Annapurna Massif

== Books ==
- Moderne Felstechnik, Bergverlag Rother, 1975
- The application of the rope in ice and rock, Bergverlag Rother, 1998, ISBN 3-7633-6082-4
- Alpine rope technique for beginners and advanced, Bergverlag Rother, 2000, ISBN 3-7633-6083-2
- (Alpine club leader extreme) Kaisergebirge, Bergverlag Rudolf Rother, 2000. ISBN 3-7633-1272-2
- Via ferrata, Bergverlag Rother, 2003, ISBN 3-7633-6019-0
- Safety and Risk in Rock and Ice, Bergverlag Rother, Volume 1, 7th Edition, 2004, ISBN 3-7633-6016-6; Volume 2, 2002, ISBN 3-7633-6018-2; Volume 3, 2006, ISBN 3-7633-6031-X
- Alpine Curriculum, Vol. 5: Safety at the Mountain, BLV Verlagsgesellschaft, 2003, ISBN 3-405-16632-2
- Anecdotes from the mountain: Amusing stories of mountaineering, climbing and skiing, Bergverlag Rother, 2010, ISBN 3-7633-7039-0
