= George Pitts (photographer) =

American academic, artist and poet (1951–2017)

George Pitts (né George Edward Pitts Jr.; September 10, 1951 – March 4, 2017) was an American academic, artist and poet, based in Brooklyn, New York.

== Early life and education ==
Pitts was the son of newspaper journalist George Edward Pitts Sr. (1925–1987), and Phyllis Forbes (maiden; 1931–2008).

From September 1969 to December 1969, Pitts studied art, creative writing, and literature at Howard University in Washington, D.C.

In 1971, Pitts won a first prize while studying at the Skowhegan School of Painting and Sculpture in Skowhegan, Maine.

In 1973, he earned a Bachelor of Arts degree from Bennington College in Bennington, Vermont.

== Career ==
Pitts was, in 1993, the founding director of photography at Vibe Magazine, and served in that role until 2004.

He was an assistant professor of photography at Parsons School of Design. In 2004, Pitts became the director of photography at Life magazine.

His work has been published by The New York Times Magazine, Werk, New York magazine, S magazine and Complex magazine.

In addition to his photography, Pitts was also a painter and poet. His art and writings have appeared in publications including Big magazine, S magazine, and The Paris Review.

In 2006, he received the Lucie Award for Picture Editor of the Year.

== Death ==
Pitts died on March 4, 2017, after a long illness.
