= 2-Propanoyl-3-(4-isopropylphenyl)-tropane =

Chemical compound

Identifiers
- IUPAC name: 2-Propanoyl-3-(4-isopropylphenyl)-tropane
- CAS Number: 162809-72-5
- PubChem CID: 44458747
- ChemSpider: 23121202
- ChEMBL: ChEMBL278122

Chemical and physical data
- Formula: C_{20}H_{29}NO
- Molar mass: 299.458 g·mol^{−1}
- 3D model (JSmol): Interactive image
- SMILES: CCC(=O)C1C2N(C)C(CC2)CC1c3ccc(C(C)C)cc3
- InChI: InChI=1S/C20H29NO/c1-5-19(22)20-17(12-16-10-11-18(20)21(16)4)15-8-6-14(7-9-15)13(2)3/h6-9,13,16-18,20H,5,10-12H2,1-4H3; Key:BVSOMKYAWFJCTH-UHFFFAOYSA-N

2-Propanoyl-3-(4-isopropylphenyl)-tropane (WF-31, PIT) is a cocaine analogue which acts as a serotonin-norepinephrine-dopamine reuptake inhibitor (SNDRI). Research shows WF-31 to be approximately ten times more potent than cocaine at binding to the serotonin transporter and at inhibiting its reuptake.

== See also ==
- List of cocaine analogues
