= Edwin Howard Armstrong award =

The Major Armstrong award, named after the inventor of FM radio, Edwin Howard Armstrong, is presented "to AM and FM stations for excellence and originality in radio broadcasting" by the Armstrong Memorial Research Foundation at Columbia University.

The Institute of Electrical and Electronics Engineers Communications Society also has an award named after Edwin Armstrong. The award was created in 1958 under the name Achievement Award, and was renamed Edwin Howard Armstrong Achievement Award in 1975.

The Radio Club of America also presents an award named after Edwin Armstrong.

At Columbia University, the Armstrong Memorial Research Foundation nested in the Department of Electrical Engineering delivers the Edwin Howard Armstrong Memorial Award.
