= Fort Pitt =

Fort Pitt may refer to:

== Saskatchewan, Canada ==
- Fort Pitt Farms Christian Community, Hutterite group
- Battle of Fort Pitt, during the 1885 North-West Rebellion
- Fort Pitt Provincial Park, named after a Hudson's Bay Company trading post, now listed in the Canadian Register of Historic Places

== Kent, England ==
- Fort Pitt Grammar School
- Fort Pitt, Kent, Napoleonic-era fort

== Pittsburgh, Pennsylvania, USA ==
- Fort Pitt (Pennsylvania), on the site of present-day Pittsburgh
- Fort Pitt (Amtrak), former train operated between Pittsburgh and Altoona
- Fort Pitt Blockhouse, a structure built in support of Fort Pitt
- Fort Pitt Boulevard
- Fort Pitt Brewing Company, active 1906 to 1957
- Fort Pitt Bridge
- Fort Pitt Elementary School
- Fort Pitt Foundry, historic armory
- Fort Pitt Hornets, former ice hockey team
- Fort Pitt Incline, former funicular railroad
- Fort Pitt Museum
- Fort Pitt Regiment, soccer club
- Siege of Fort Pitt, in 1763 during Pontiac's War
- Treaty of Fort Pitt, 1778, between the United States and the Lenape people
- Fort Pitt Tunnel
