= James Pitts (American Patriot) =

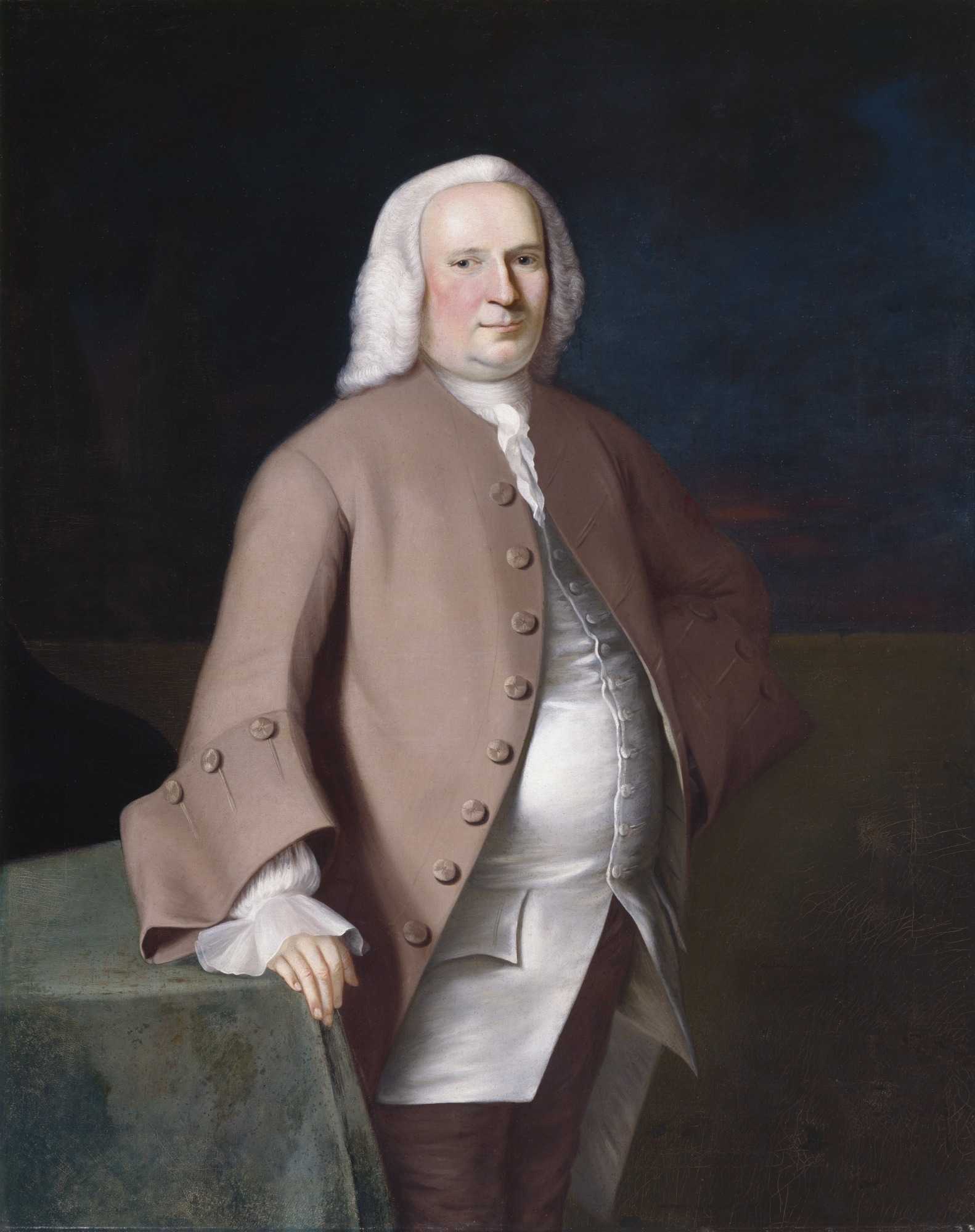
- Born: 1712
- Died: 1776 (aged 63–64)

James Pitts (1712–1776) was a Massachusetts merchant and an early American Patriot.

== Biography ==
Pitts, was born in Boston, Massachusetts in 1712 he was the son of John Pitts, who emigrated from England. (Note: John Pitts was a Massachusetts merchant, who was born in England in 1668. His father, Baruth Pitts, was mayor of Lyme Regis, England. John emigrated to Boston in 1694, became a merchant, and held several offices under the city. Smibert painted portraits of him and his wife.) He graduated from Harvard in 1731, and succeeded to his father's business and fortune. He was a member of the king's council from 1766 till 1775. On the death of Governor Bowdoin (his father-in-law) he became his executor.

Pitts, his wife and their six sons took an active part in the American Revolution. His house, which stood on the spot that was occupied by the Howard Athenæum, was a resort of the Adamses and other American Patriots. In 1770, with Royal Tyler and Samuel Dexter, he was instrumental in persuading Governor Thomas Hutchinson to comply with the popular demand for the removal of the troops from Boston. He was for many years treasurer of the Society for propagating Christian knowledge among the Indians. He died in 1776. (Note: Blackburn painted portraits of both James and Elizabeth (his wife) (Wilson & Fiske 1900))

== Family ==
In 1732 Pitts married Elizabeth Bowdoin, sister of Governor James Bowdoin. Their eldest son, John (Boston 1738 – Tyngsboro 1815), was graduated at Harvard in 1757, was selectman of Boston from 1773 till 1778, represented the city in several provincial congresses, was speaker of the house in 1778, and afterwards a state senator.

A younger son, Lendall (Boston 1737–1787), was an American Patriot, principal leader of the Boston Tea Party, and the defendant in Gray v. Pitts (1771).

James's grandson, Thomas (1779–1835). He was commissioned lieutenant of light artillery in 1808, and captain in 1809, and served through the War of 1812.
