= Communications Update / Cast Iron TV =

Communications Update / Cast Iron TV was a weekly artist-run television series which ran on Manhattan cable TV Public-access television channel D from 1979 through 1992.

Its initial aim was to provide an alternative source of information and an alternative approach to questions often slighted or ignored by broadcast TV. Topics included video verité of the cable franchising process, home satellite TV, and third world views on communications control.

As the number of artist producers expanded, so did the style and subject matter of the shows, which ranged from political documentary to satire.

Communications Update subsequently focused on works which explored the relationship between documentary and drama, not conforming to either but drawing from both.

In 1983, the series was renamed Cast Iron TV to reflect its changing orientation as a forum for experimental video makers. Programs in the series included artists' segments commissioned or made specifically for the show, as well as previously existing video works. Milli Iatrou coordinated the series for two years from 1984 to 1986. Terese Svoboda followed her, continuing the series for four years until 1990 when Betsy Newman took over for two years until 1992. Communications Update / Cast Iron TV was eventually considered to fall under the rubric of "alternative television" or "artists' television."

== History ==
In September 1979, Liza Bear, cofounder of Avalanche magazine and of Send/Receive Satellite Network, initiated a 10-week series entitled the "WARC Report" on the World Administrative Radio Conference then taking place in Geneva. Co-producers were Michael McClard and Willoughby Sharp in New York, and Rolf Brand in Geneva. A slow-scan link for relaying images on phone lines was set up between Geneva and New York. The impetus for producing the series, according to Bear, was the fact that "the TV media was not covering communications issues and we felt that it had to be done." When WARC ended, still concerned with public telecommunications policies and the uses of the new technology, the program was renamed Communications Update; it continued to run in the same 7:30 pm, post-news time slot.

After its initial season, Communications Update began to shift its emphasis. Bear explains, "I didn't want to go on just becoming a lexicon or dictionary of new technology or new political policy problems." While retaining its documentary mode, Communications Update began to develop as an outlet for programs made by individuals attempting to gain an "active role in the making of information as artists and citizens."

By 1982, the programs in the series had a broad range of styles and concerns from documentary to abstract fiction. A lot of the shows attempted to expose the manipulation carried out by television. For example, "The Very Reverend Deacon b. Peachy," by Ron Morgan and Milli Iatrou, was about a tele-evangelist newly arrived in New York who finds his moral intentions subverted by the economic imperatives of the medium and its technology.

Several of the productions that originated on Communications Update / Cast Iron TV have been shown in video festivals in Bonn, Bologna and The Hague, as well as The Museum of Modern Art, The American Museum of the Moving Image, The Kitchen and the Whitney Museum of American Art.

== See also ==
- Paper Tiger Television
- Liza Bear
