= Liza Béar =

New York-based filmmaker

Liza Béar is a New York-based filmmaker, writer, photographer, and media activist who makes both individual and collaborative works. Béar co-founded two early independent art publications Avalanche magazine and Bomb. Since 1968 she has lived and worked in New York City.

== Early life ==
Béar was raised in France and England. She studied Philosophy at the University of London.

== Career ==
=== Avalanche Magazine ===
In 1968, Béar co-founded and edited Avalanche magazine with Willoughby Sharp, producing thirteen issues between 1970 and 1976.Avalanche explored conceptual art and other new forms of art making, such as performance art and land art, from the artist's perspective and featured interviews with artists done by either Béar, Sharp, or both of the editors together, documenting artists' work and news and avoiding criticism as a matter of editorial policy. Among the artists featured in early editions of Avalanche magazine were Vito Acconci, Lawrence Weiner, Joseph Beuys, Gordon Matta-Clark, and Yvonne Rainer. Avalanche was also influential in its design. Béar was especially attuned to the possibilities of the interview as an artistic form in its own right. For example, in her interview with Joel Shapiro in Avalanche 12, she conceived of the conversation through the narrative and formal devices of film.

=== Telecommunications ===
In 1977 she collaborated with Keith Sonnier and several other artists to stage the two-day project Send/Receive Satellite Network, an interactive video link set up via a NASA satellite between participants in New York City and San Francisco. The live feed was relayed directly by infrared link to via Manhattan public access cable in New York, and to a Bay Area public access station.

In 1978–79, following the Send/Receive project, Béar pioneered the use of Slow Scan and Telefax technology as a means to continue interactive visual exchanges between individual artists and artist groups, but using the phone lines rather than a satellite connection. The largest of these demonstrations included eleven cities in the United States and Canada. Among the participating artist groups in New York City was Collaborative Projects (originally named the Green Corporation) of which Béar was a founding member with forty to fifty other artists. She also appeared in the 1979 Public Arts International/Free Speech performance art events.

From 1979 – 1991 Béar co-founded the artist public access television show Communications Update / Cast Iron TV, which showed on Manhattan Cable's Channel D. The show debuted as the 10-week series "The WARC Report", providing coverage of the 1979 World Administrative Radio Conference at which frequencies were allocated for various uses of the spectrum by broadcast and other technologies. The series included a Slow Scan feed from Geneva, Switzerland as well as live studio interviews with telecommunications experts. Of the WARC report programs, Rachel Wetzler has written that they "were fundamentally concerned with the intermingling of governmental, corporate, and military interests that determined and regulated access to information on a global scale." The show continued uninterruptedly on Manhattan Cable's access channel but changed its name to Communications Update and diversified its focus to include experimental programs by artists and filmmakers, including satire and comedy.

=== Films ===
Beginning in 1978 with Souk El Arba, Béar has made a number of films in formats ranging from Super 8 to 35mm. They include the shorts Oued Nefifik: A Foreign Movie (1982), a post-colonial comedy of manners, Lost Oasis, Earthglow and the feature film Force of Circumstance (1989), a political intrigue set in Casablanca and Washington DC, starring Boris Major, Eric Mitchell, Jessica Stutchbury and Tom Wright. Her films and videos have been exhibited at the Festival of the Other Avant-Garde, the São Paulo Biennial, the Museum of Modern Art, Anthology Film Archives, the Edinburgh International Film Festival, "American Independents", Berlinale, the Institute of Contemporary Arts, London, UK and the Cinema Arts Centre, Huntington, Long Island.

==== Select filmography ====
- Five Video Pioneers (1977)
- Send/Receive (1977)
- Jackie Winsor: Work in Progress (1975–1978)
- Towards a New World Information Order (1979)
- Satellite TV: Birth of an Industry (1980)
- Polisario: Liberation of the Western Sahara (1981)
- Lost Oasis (1982)
- Oued Nefifik: A Foreign Movie (1982)
- Earthglow (1983)
- Force of Circumstance (1989)
- Homeward Bound (1988)
- Spring Lake (2013)

=== BOMB magazine ===
In 1981, along with Betsy Sussler, Sarah Charlesworth, Glenn O'Brien, and McClard, Béar co-founded Bomb. The first edition, which was published in May 1981, featured artwork by Sarah Charlesworth on the cover. The title of the publication was both a reference to British Vorticism and their publication, Blast, and to the fact that the founders believed that the magazine would "bomb" and fail after only a few editions.

== Publications ==
Béar has written both fiction and non-fiction. In the late 80s and early 90s her first-person short stories set in Hawaii, Jamaica and downtown New York were published in Between C and D and Bomb Magazine. As a freelance reporter, her features, interviews and filmmaker profiles have appeared in Variety, Bomb, Newsday, the New York Times, The Boston Globe, Ms. Magazine, the Village Voice, the New York Daily News, indiewire, Salon.com, Interview Magazine and Artforum.

More recently, Béar is the author of Beyond the Frame: Dialogues with World Filmmakers, (Praeger: 2007), ISBN 0275996670, a selection of her interviews with 55 filmmakers from 23 countries. She also co-authored "The Early History of Avalanche 1968–1972" (2005) with Willoughby Sharp.

== Awards ==
Béar's awards in film and literature include:

- 1983 National Endowment for the Arts, Video Artist Fellowship
- 1984 Jerome Independent Filmmaker Fellowship
- 1985 National Endowment for the Arts, Film Production Award
- 1990 NYFA Creative Non-Fiction Fellowship
- 1990 Philafilm, Silver Award, Feature Film "Force of Circumstance"
- 1994 Edward Albee Writing Fellowship

== Bibliography ==
- Hulser, Kathleen. "Artists Gain Access to Cable," Videography, Vol. 10, Issue 1, January 1985
- Allen, Gwen. "Against Criticism: The Artist Interview in Avalanche Magazine, 1970–1976." Art Journal 64, 3 (Fall 2005): 50–61.
- Allen, Gwen. Artists’ Magazines: An Alternative Space for Art. Cambridge: MIT Press, 2011.
- Allen, Gwen. "In on the Ground Floor: Avalanche and the Soho Art Scene, 1970–1976." Artforum International 44, 3 (November 2005): 214–221.
- Ballmer, Amy. "In the Words of the Artist." Art Documentation 30, 1 (Spring 2011): 21–26. Errata: Page 21 of the article states "A few months after the meeting, Béar had relocated to New York, and she and Sharp founded Avalanche." This statement misconstrues the timeline of Avalanche’s founding. Sharp and Béar decided to work on a magazine together during their second meeting, also in November 1968.
- Béar, Liza and Hans Haacke. "Artist in Residence: Liza Béar and Hans Haacke on Willoughby Sharp (1936–2008)." Artforum International 47, 7 (March 2009): 57–60.
- Liza Béar and Willoughby Sharp, The Early History of Avalanche (London: Chelsea Space, 2005).
