= Avalanche (magazine) =

American arts magazine

Joseph Beuys on the cover of Avalanche

Avalanche was an American New York City-based arts magazine that existed for the six years between 1970 and 1976. 13 issues, all in black and white, were produced. Avalanche was co-founded and co-edited by Willoughby Sharp and Liza Béar. Their aim was to cover Postminimalism from the artist's perspective, exploring conceptual art, minimal art, performance art, and land art.

== Editorial focus ==
Avalanche featured interviews with artists, done by either Béar, Sharp, or both of the editors together. The magazine featured a single, often close-cropped, portrait of an artist on almost every cover. Its editorial emphasis was to document artists' work and Postminimalism art news. It avoided standard art criticism and art reviews as a matter of editorial policy. The singular intention of the magazine was to foreground conceptual artistic ideas without mediation from art critics or other writers.

Avalanche was initially designed as a square-shaped journal similar to Artforum. Its covers resembled vinyl albums.

Among the featured artists were Vito Acconci, Laurie Anderson, Bill Beckley, Joseph Beuys, Chris Burden, Daniel Buren, Hanne Darboven, Walter De Maria, Jan Dibbets, Barbara Dilley, Simone Forti, Gilbert & George, Philip Glass, Hans Haacke, Jannis Kounellis, Meredith Monk, Barry Le Va, Sol LeWitt, Richard Long, Gordon Matta-Clark, Bruce Nauman, Dennis Oppenheim, Steve Paxton, Yvonne Rainer, Klaus Rinke, Joel Shapiro, Jack Smith, Keith Sonnier, Richard Serra, Robert Smithson, George Trakas, William Wegman, Lawrence Weiner, and Jackie Winsor.

For its final five issues, Avalanche went to a tabloid format, but bankruptcy brought a halt to its run in 1976.

== Legacy ==
In 2010 a reprint of the first eight issues of Avalanche was created by Primary Information.
