= FOOD (New York City restaurant) =

Artisanal restaurant in Manhattan, New York

- Interactive map of FOOD

Restaurant information
- Established: October 1971
- Closed: {late 1980s
- Previous owners: Carol Goodden, Tina Girouard, Gordon Matta-Clark
- Food type: home-cooked, artisanal
- Location: New York City, New York, United States
- Coordinates: 40.7265097°N 74.0019006°W

FOOD

FOOD was an artist-run restaurant in SoHo, Manhattan, New York. FOOD was founded by artists Carol Goodden, Tina Girouard and Gordon Matta-Clark. FOOD was considered one of the first important restaurants in SoHo. Other individuals who were involved with FOOD included Suzanne Harris and Rachel Lew. FOOD was a place where artists in SoHo, especially those who were later involved in Avalanche magazine and The Anarchitecture Group (an artists' group), could meet and enjoy food together. FOOD was considered to be both a business and an artistic "intervention in an urban setting." It has also been called a "landmark that still resonates in the history and mythology of SoHo in the 1970s."

== History ==
Before they founded FOOD, Goodden and Matta-Clark were already cooking for artists in New York and were already known for throwing dinner parties for friends, mainly hosted at their loft. In 1971, they roasted an entire pig under the Brooklyn Bridge. The roast was known as the Brooklyn Bridge Event. The Event was accompanied by outdoor sculpture and celebrated the opening of the Alternative Gallery Space on Greene Street. The sculptures at the pig roast had been curated by Alanna Heiss of the Museum of Modern Art (MOMA.) Music for the roast was done by Dickie Landry and the Philip Glass Ensemble.

Matta-Clark suggested to Goodden the idea for a restaurant, which she found appealing. They chose a location in SoHo on the corner of Prince and Wooster streets. There was a struggling restaurant there called Comidas Criollas and Goodden negotiated the lease from them. At that time, SoHo was considered a cultural desert, with struggling businesses. Goodden had access to an inheritance which she was able to use as the initial investment for the restaurant. Gooden and Matta-Clark wanted to create a space where they could help their friends find jobs while giving people a place to eat in what would later be known as SoHo. Matta-Clark and Girouard began to renovate the place. FOOD opened in October 1971 at 127 Prince Street. During the renovations, Matta-Clark was inspired to do some of his original "cutting" art works.

FOOD was intended to be a simple project designed to bring the artistic community together. Artists were invited to be guest chefs, as well as working at the restaurant on a regular basis. There was no ordering of many different dishes at FOOD, diners ate what was offered on that day. The menu was simple and affordable. Meals included items like raw mackerel in wasabi sauce, Creole-style stuffed tongue and anchovy onion pie. FOOD was considered to be an "active and dynamic site" which served nearly one hundred people daily in 1972.

In 1972 Matta-Clark created a 43-minute documentary of the restaurant. He was often seen as the center of the energy surrounding FOOD restaurant.

FOOD only lasted about three years with the original founders. After Matta-Clark lost interest in the project, Goodden was left to carry on mostly on her own. Eventually, the restaurant was handed over to new operators who ran FOOD until the 1980s. However, FOOD did not retain its artistic roots under the new management.

== Legacy ==
FOOD was said to inspire others who create food art, or work in the field of relational art." Many famous artists and performers, such as Donald Judd, Robert Rauschenberg and John Cage created meals at FOOD. The cooking and the meals themselves were a kind of a performance art, especially the soup. Gooden felt that soup could be used as a sort of "painting" for the table. Matta-Clark developed a meal that he based on bones called Matta-Bones which cost $4. After the meal, the bones were used to create necklaces for the diner to wear. Matta-Bones once served over 100 people and after they ate, Richard Peck scrubbed the bones clean in the kitchen after which Hisachika Takahashi, an assistant to Rauschenberg and a jeweler, drilled holes in the bones so that they could be strung onto rope. Another unusual meal was made of living brine shrimp swimming in egg whites called Alive. Perhaps the most unusual dinner was never realized: Mark di Suvero wished to serve meals through the windows of the restaurant using a crane and directing diners to eat with tools such as screwdrivers and hammers.

FOOD was noted for using fresh and seasonal foods, which was a "vaguely countercultural" idea for the time. FOOD was one of the first New York restaurants to serve sushi which had been suggested by Takahashi. Another unusual feature of FOOD was that it was one of the first places to serve vegetarian meals. FOOD also "championed" the use of the open kitchen which is seen in many modern restaurants.

Other famous artists who were frequently seen at FOOD included the members of Mabou Mines, the Philip Glass group and dancers of Grand Union. Filmmaker artist musician Vincent Gallo stated FOOD was the first place in New York City he ate at.

== FOOD 1971/2013 ==
The Frieze Art Fair recognized the contributions of FOOD to the artistic community in 2013 by inviting several chefs from the original FOOD to participate at the fair. Goodden and Girouard both contributed to the tribute of FOOD with Goodden preparing her famous soups and Girouard paying homage to the pig roast under the Brooklyn Bridge. FOOD 1971/2013 was created by curator, Cecilia Alemani and conceived of as a special project for the fair.
