= Tina Girouard =

American artist (1946–2020)

- Tina Girouard in 1970 in video art performance Maintenance I
- Born: Cynthia Marie Girouard; May 26, 1946; DeQuincy, Louisiana, US
- Died: April 21, 2020 (aged 73); Cecilia, Louisiana, US
- Education: BFA, University of Southwestern Louisiana (1968)
- Known for: Video and Performance Art
- Notable work: FOOD
- Movement: Postminimalism

Cynthia Marie "Tina" Girouard (May 26, 1946 – April 21, 2020) was an American video and performance artist best known for her work and involvement in the SoHo art scene of the 1960s and early 1970s.

== Early life and education ==
Cynthia Marie Girouard was born in 1946 at DeQuincy, Louisiana, to Yvelle Marie (Theriot) Girouard, a special education teacher, and Whitney Lewis Girouard, a farmer and teacher of agricultural engineering. She studied art at the University of Southwestern Louisiana, graduating with a BFA in 1968.

== Career ==
When she moved to New York City, Tina Girouard befriended other Louisiana-born artists, including Lynda Benglis, musician/artist Richard "Dickie" Landry, and Keith Sonnier. Their work helped establish New York City's post-minimalist scene.

Although not as widely recognized as some of her contemporaries, she was an early founding participant of the art spaces 112 Greene Street which became White Columns, FOOD, The Clocktower, P.S. 1 Contemporary Art Center, Creative Time, and The Fabric Workshop and Museum. In addition to her own art projects she was involved in films, videos and performances by Keith Sonnier, Richard Serra, Lawrence Weiner, Laurie Anderson and the Natural History of the American Dancer, among others. Girouard worked as a designer with the New York theater group Mabou Mines in the seventies on several productions including The Red Horse Animation and The B. Beaver Animation. Along with Carol Goodden and Gordon Matta-Clark, Girouard was one of the founders of FOOD, an artist-run restaurant in Soho that combined culinary arts with other visual and performance art practices. At FOOD, the acts of cooking and eating were seen as art performances. In 1977 Girouard performed with Gerard Murrell as part of the performance program of Documenta 6.

For her contribution to the 1981 exhibition Other Realities: Installations for Performance at the Contemporary Arts Museum Houston, Girouard led a ten-day workshop with local students and then turned material generated during the workshop into the basis for a performance. The remnants of the performance, including costumes, sets, and props, were then exhibited as an installation. Girouard's work was featured in a solo exhibition curated by Susan Rothenberg at CUE Art Foundation in 2004. More recently it was shown as part of 112 Greene Street: The Early Years (1970-1974) curated by Jessamyn Fiore at David Zwirner Gallery in New York in 2011, and included in the related publication of the same title. Fiore also curated Gordon Matta-Clark, Suzanne Harris, and Tina Girouard: The 112 Greene Street Years at the Rhona Hoffman Gallery in Chicago in 2013.

In 2013 Girouard participated in the tribute to FOOD organized by Frieze New York.

Girouard's 1977 installation performance piece Pinwheel, originally executed at the New Orleans Museum of Art, was recreated alongside documentation of the original event at the 2019 edition of Art Basel Miami Beach.

In 2019, Girouard was one of the artists selected for the multi-country retrospective exhibition called Pattern, Crime & Decoration at Le Consortium in Dijon France. The same year, Girouard's Pinwheel was shown by gallery Anat Ebgi at The Art Basel Miami Beach Art Fair . In 2020, Girouard's first solo exhibition in Los Angeles, A Place That Has No Name , took place at Anat Ebgi Gallery . The show was featured in Artforum . In 2024 Girouard exhibited in New York City at gallery Magenta Plains.

In 2024, her textile works in the DNA-Icons series are featured in a solo exhibition titled Conflicting Evidence at Magenta Plains, New York. Art critic Theodora Bocanegra Lang writes in a review published in IMPULSE Magazine: "This series of hanging screen-printed banners was produced in collaboration with The Fabric Workshop and Museum in Philadelphia. These works embrace and experiment with new ways of using contemporary textiles while furthering and complicating Girouard’s interest in communal action and communication."

== Personal life ==
Girouard died of a stroke at her home in Cecilia, Louisiana on April 21, 2020. She was 73.
