= Dia Beacon =

Modern art museum in Beacon, New York, United States

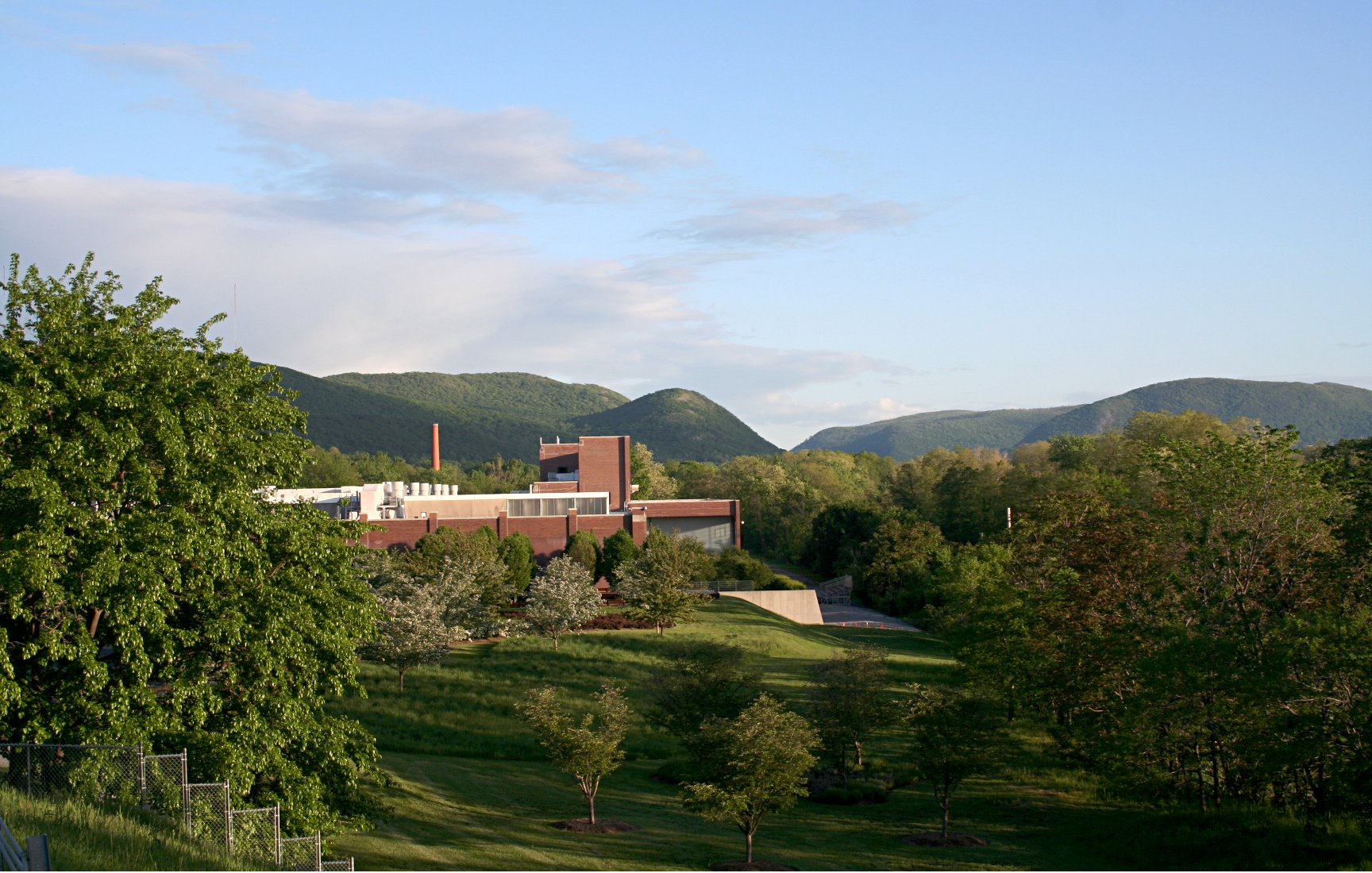
- Established: 2003
- Location: 3 Beekman Street, Beacon, New York
- Coordinates: 41.499708°N 73.982484°W
- Type: Modern and contemporary art.
- Visitors: 100,000
- Public transit access: Beacon station, Metro-North Hudson Line
- Website: Official website
- National Biscuit Company Carton Making and Printing Plant
- U.S. National Register of Historic Places
- Area: 26.6 acres (10.8 ha)
- Built: 1929
- Architect: Louis N. Wirsching, Jr.; John W. Cowpers Co.
- NRHP reference No.: 03000253
- Added to NRHP: April 18, 2003

Dia Beacon is the museum for the Dia Art Foundation's collection of art from the 1960s to the present and is one of the 12 locations and sites they manage. The museum, which opened in 2003, is situated near the banks of the Hudson River in Beacon, New York. Dia Beacon's facility, the Riggio Galleries, is a former Nabisco box-printing facility that was renovated by Dia with artist Robert Irwin and architects Alan Koch, Lyn Rice, Galia Solomonoff, and Linda Taalman, then of OpenOffice. Along with Dia's permanent collection, Dia Beacon also presents temporary exhibitions, as well as public programs designed to complement the collection and exhibitions, including monthly Gallery Talks, Merce Cunningham Dance Company Events, Community Free Days for neighboring counties, and an education program that serves area students at all levels. With 240,000 square feet (22,000 m^{2}), it is one of the largest exhibition spaces in the country for modern and contemporary art.

== Overview ==
Dia pioneered the conversion of industrial buildings for the installation of contemporary art, a practice and aesthetic now widely adopted by museums and galleries internationally. Dia's most recent conversion, its museum in Beacon, is located in a former printing plant built in 1929 by Nabisco (National Biscuit Company). The museum is sited on thirty-one acres near the banks of the Hudson River, and is adjacent to ninety acres of riverfront parkland. It is a five-minute walk from the Metro-North train station in Beacon, 60 miles (80 minutes by train) north of New York City.

Dia Beacon's expansive spaces are well suited to the needs of large-scale installations, paintings, and sculptures. In keeping with Dia's history of single-artist, site-related presentations, each gallery was designed specifically for the art it contains. This includes Andy Warhol's 1978–79 multipart work Shadows, displayed in a single installation measuring approximately 350 linear feet; selections from Dan Flavin's series of fluorescent light Monuments to V. Tatlin (1964–81); Richard Serra's monumental steel sculptures, Torqued Ellipses; and Michael Heizer's North, East, South, West (1967/2002). The ideal viewing conditions created by reflected north light from more than 34,000 square feet (3,200 m^{2}) of skylights are especially evident in the galleries devoted to the paintings of On Kawara, Agnes Martin, Blinky Palermo, and Robert Ryman.

Dia collaborated with American artist Robert Irwin and architect OpenOffice to formulate the plan for the museum building and its exterior setting. The grounds include an entrance court and parking lot with a grove of flowering fruit trees and a formal garden, both of which were designed by Irwin. The adjacent Long Dock Park on the Hudson River has a site-specific work by environmental sculptor George Trakas.

Gallery

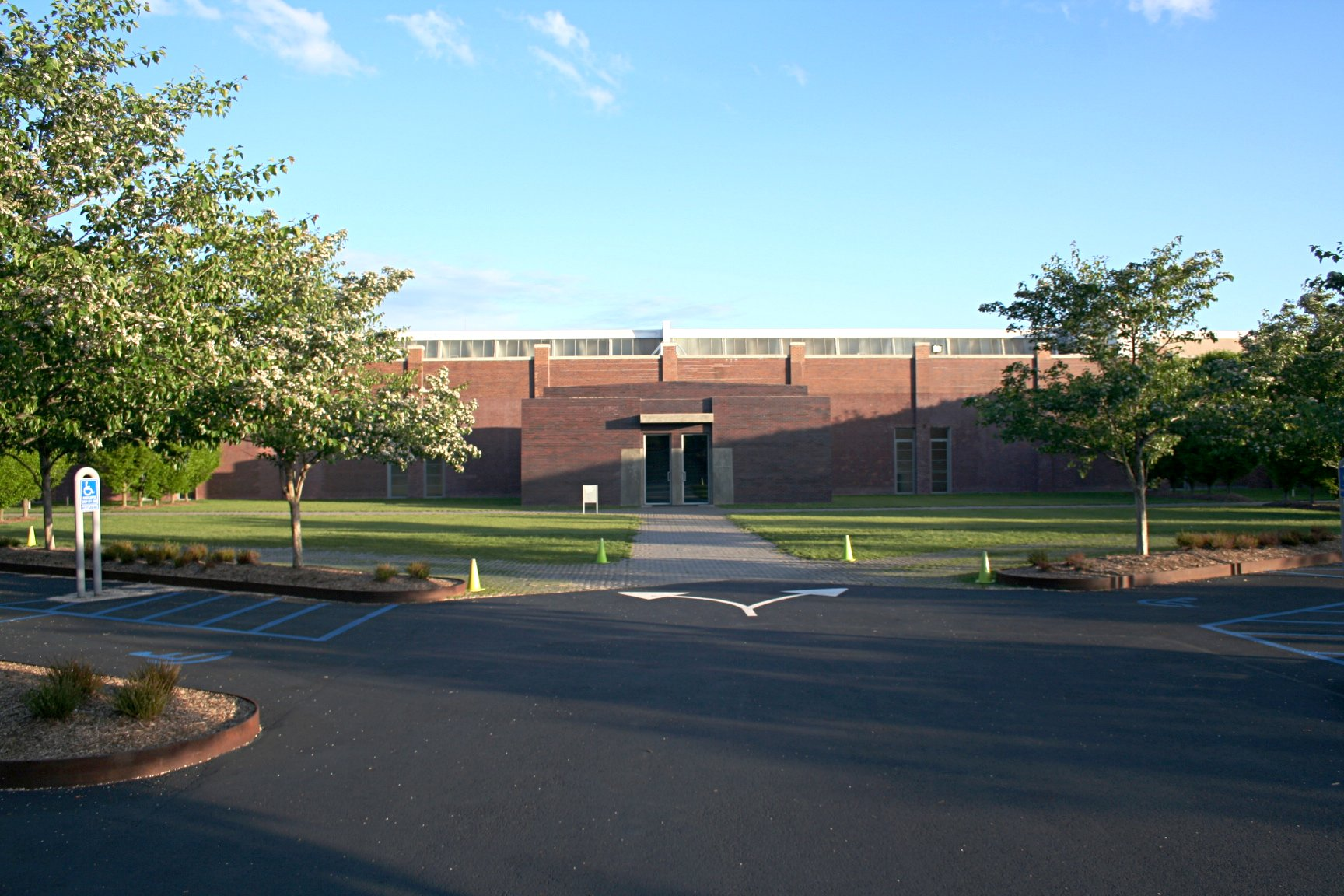
Entrance

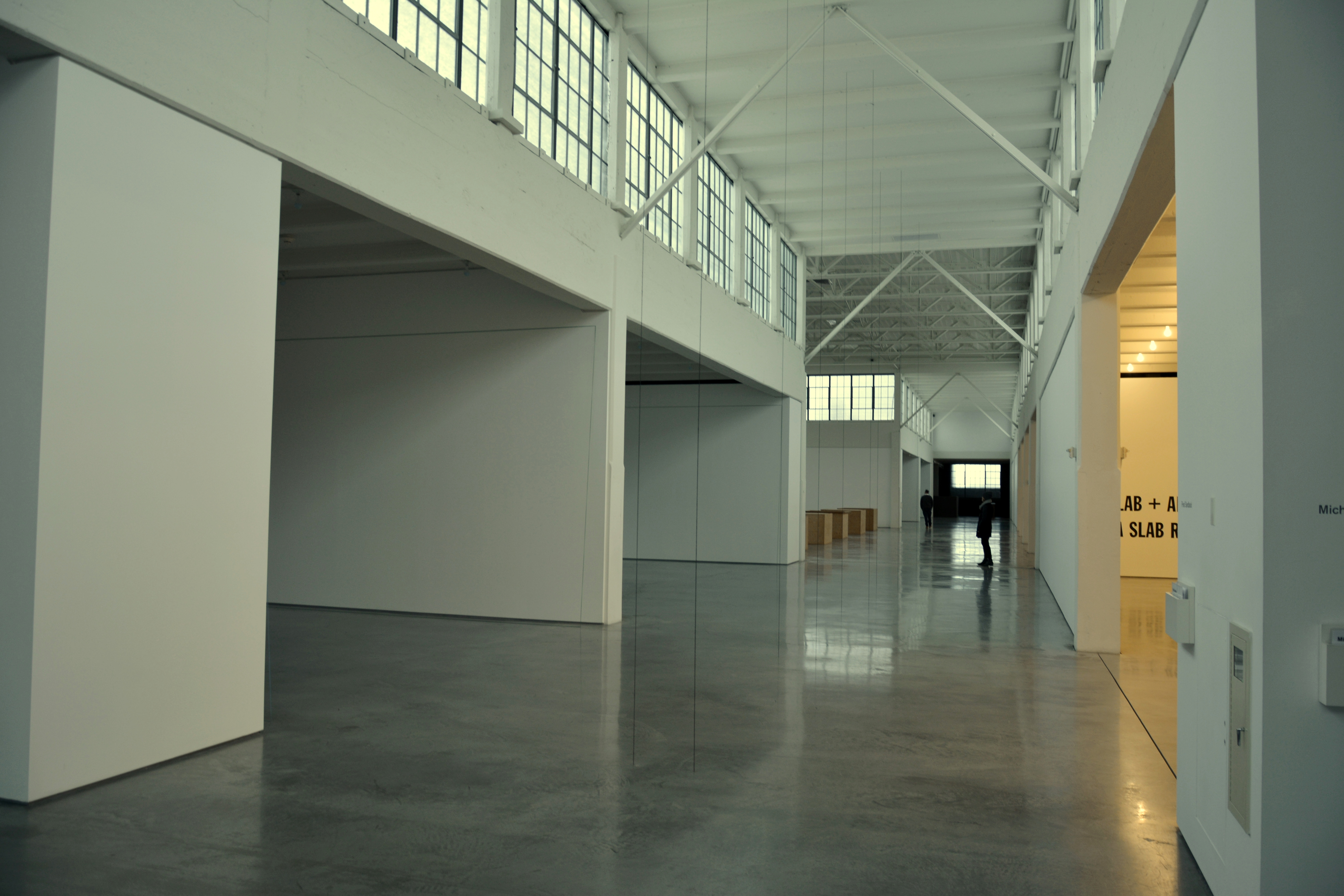
Interior hallway

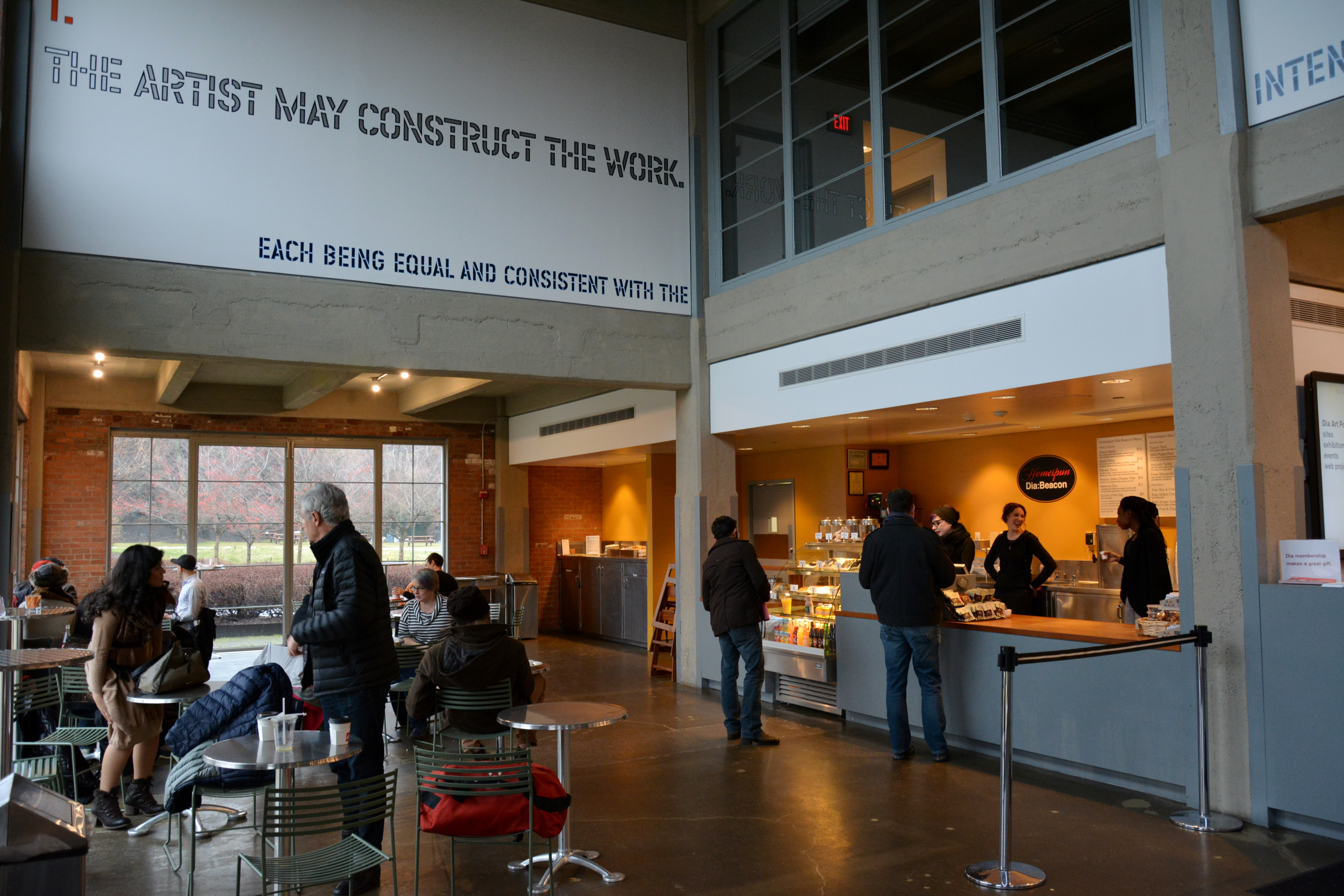
Cafe

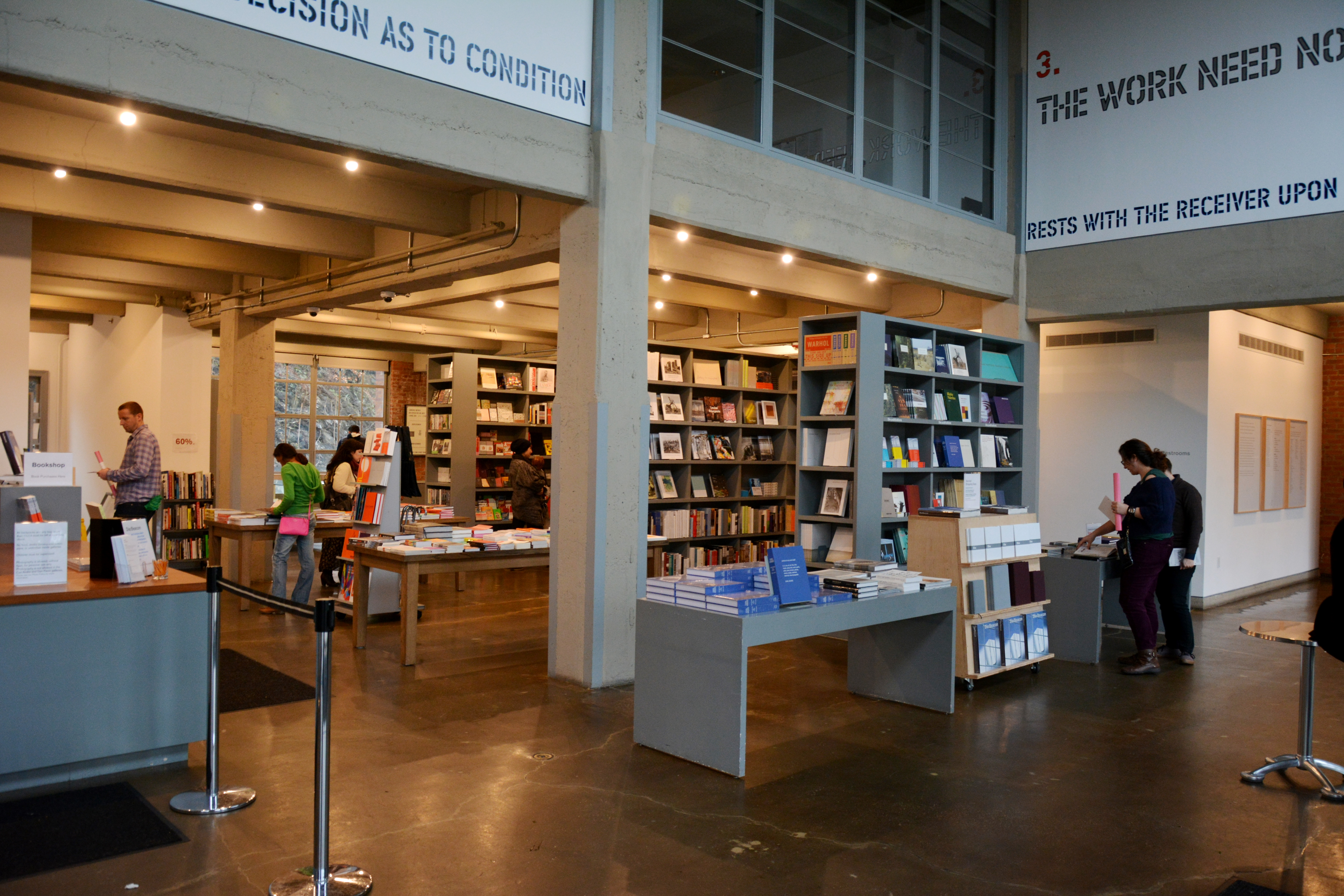
Bookshop

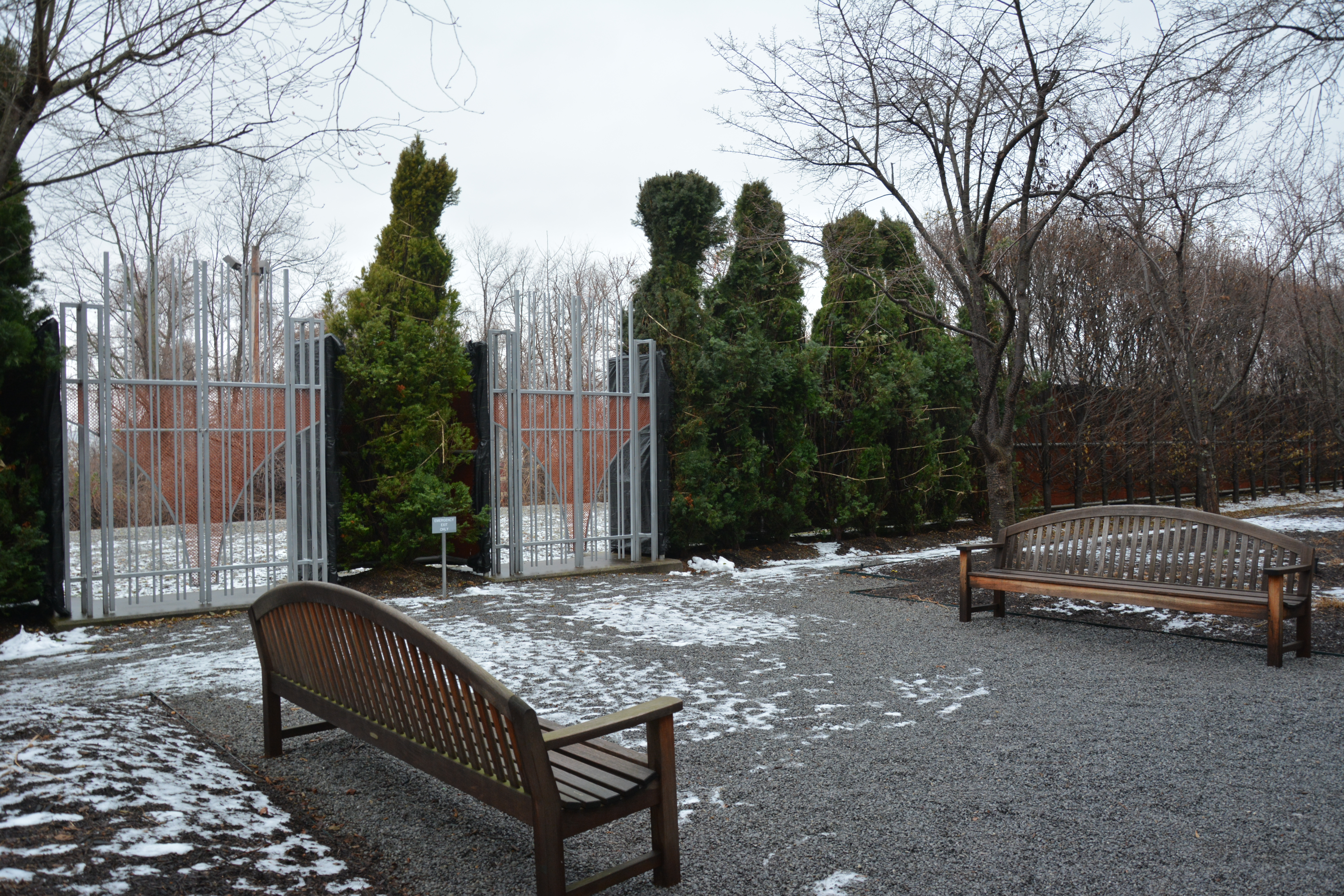
West garden

== See also ==
- Storm King Art Center, in Mountainville, New York, 13 miles from Dia Beacon
- Beacon Point, environmental art by George Trakas inaugurated in 2007 by the Dia Art Foundation in Beacon
