= Carol Goodden =

British-born American artist and dancer

- Born: London
- Known for: Photography, Dance
- Notable work: Trisha Brown Dance Company (founding member), FOOD

Carol Goodden (also known as Caroline Goodden Ames) is a New York based artist and dancer known for her photography and participation in Trisha Brown's dance company. She was also the co-founder of the artist-run restaurant, FOOD where she was the main investor.

== Biography ==
Goodden was born in London, UK during World War II and was a world traveler. In the 1970s, she was in New York where she worked as a documentary photographer and dancer. In 1995, she moved to New Mexico.

== Work ==
Much of Goodden's photography documented the ephemeral art work of the 1970s New York art scene. She became an artistic collaborator with her boyfriend and fellow artist, sculptor Gordon Matta-Clark. Goodden documented his art, such as tagging hair clumps and tying them to a wire cage which she later photographed for Hair (1972). She also documented Matta-Clark's Jacks in 1971. Because of the ephemeral nature of Matta-Clark's art, documentation was important for understanding what the art looked like.

=== Dance and performance ===
Goodden was a founding member of the Trisha Brown Dance Company in 1970. Goodden was a participant in many of Trisha Brown's dance performances. In April 1970, she was part of the original cast of Brown's Leaning Duets which took place near Wooster Street in New York City. In 1973, she danced in Raft Piece, Spanish Dance and Scallops, the last of which was performed at the Festival d'Automne in the Musee Gallera in Paris on October 6. In 1974, she performed Figure 8 with Brown's troupe in Rome at the Contemporanea Festival on January 2, and on June 2, she danced at the John F. Kennedy Center for the Performing Arts in Drift. In 1977, she conducted a series of poetry readings at the Museum of Modern Art (MoMA).

Like her documentation of Matta-Clark, Goodden also documented dance performances such as Brown's 1971 Walking on the Wall and other routines such as Man Walking Down the Side of a Building.

=== FOOD ===
FOOD was founded in 1971 by Goodden, Matta-Clark, Suzanne Harris and Rachel Lew. Goodden had been hosting artistic-themed dinner parties for friends, such as flora-themed dinner event where the guests dressed as edible flowers. She found that the idea of creating a restaurant that served fresh food in a communal setting appealed to her. Goodden received money from her family to invest in FOOD. Matta-Clark considered it to be a "restaurant around the idea of an art project." She documented FOOD through photography.

FOOD only lasted about three years. However, in that time and under the direction of Goodden, Matta-Clark and Tina Girouard who was part of FOOD the first year, when Suzanne Harris and Rachel Lew dropped out shortly after the running of FOOD began, it became an important artistic hub. While Goodden was in charge, she and others helped create a sense of "cohesion within the community and infrastructure to support it." Goodden "curated" many different artists who worked at FOOD full-time or sporadically, depending on an artists' schedule. She made sure that the artist-chefs were paid well and had flexible schedules. Goodden's philosophy in running FOOD was to provide a place where artists could work for a fair wage and have a flexible schedule changed the nature of art-production itself, moving it away from institutional spaces or gallery-spaces and into a new arena: the kitchen.

Matta-Clark became bored with FOOD when the novelty of working there waned for him, which started to happen by 1972. Goodden began to feel "overwhelmed by the managerial duties" for which she became almost solely responsible until she hired Kushner as an assistant manager. In addition, FOOD did not make money for its owners and Goodden nearly lost her family inheritance by investing in the restaurant. Goodden had hoped that even though she provided the bulk of the money for FOOD that more people would help share in the work "for the benefit of all" and that the project itself could be sustainable. However, the restaurant closed its doors in 1974. Goodden wrote, "Though we consumed food, Food consumed us."

=== Anarchitecture ===
Goodden was a member of the Anarchitecture group which met and showed work in New York. While Anarchitecture is often solely associated with Matta-Clark, "it had a broad membership of equally significant artists, including Laurie Anderson, Tina Girouard, Carol Goodden, Suzanne Harris, Jene Highstein, Bernard Kirschenbaun, Richard Landry and Richard Nonas among others." Anarchitecture was formed in 1973 and met weekly until 1974. The Anarchitecture show critiqued the ideas behind art and especially architecture and land ownership. Goodden's photographs, along with fellow Anarchitecture members was shown at the Greene gallery in March, 1974. The anonymous Anarchitecture show critiqued the unchanging nature or "stasis" of the architecture of the time. Some of the ideas surrounding the themes in Anarchitecture were derived from the loss of Goodden's fortune, leading to the use of the slogan, "Nothing Works."

=== Recent work ===
In 2013, Goodden came back to cook during the Frieze Art Fair in New York. Curator, Cecilia Alemani commissioned a project to "recreate" FOOD during the fair. Goodden prepared her own recipes, Carrot Soup Español and Cauliflower Cress Soup, on May 10, 2013, for the Frieze Art Fair.

Goodden has continued to provide artistic direction and historical reference to art from the period of time surrounding FOOD and Anarchitecture.
