= Beacon Point =

Art installation in Beacon, NY

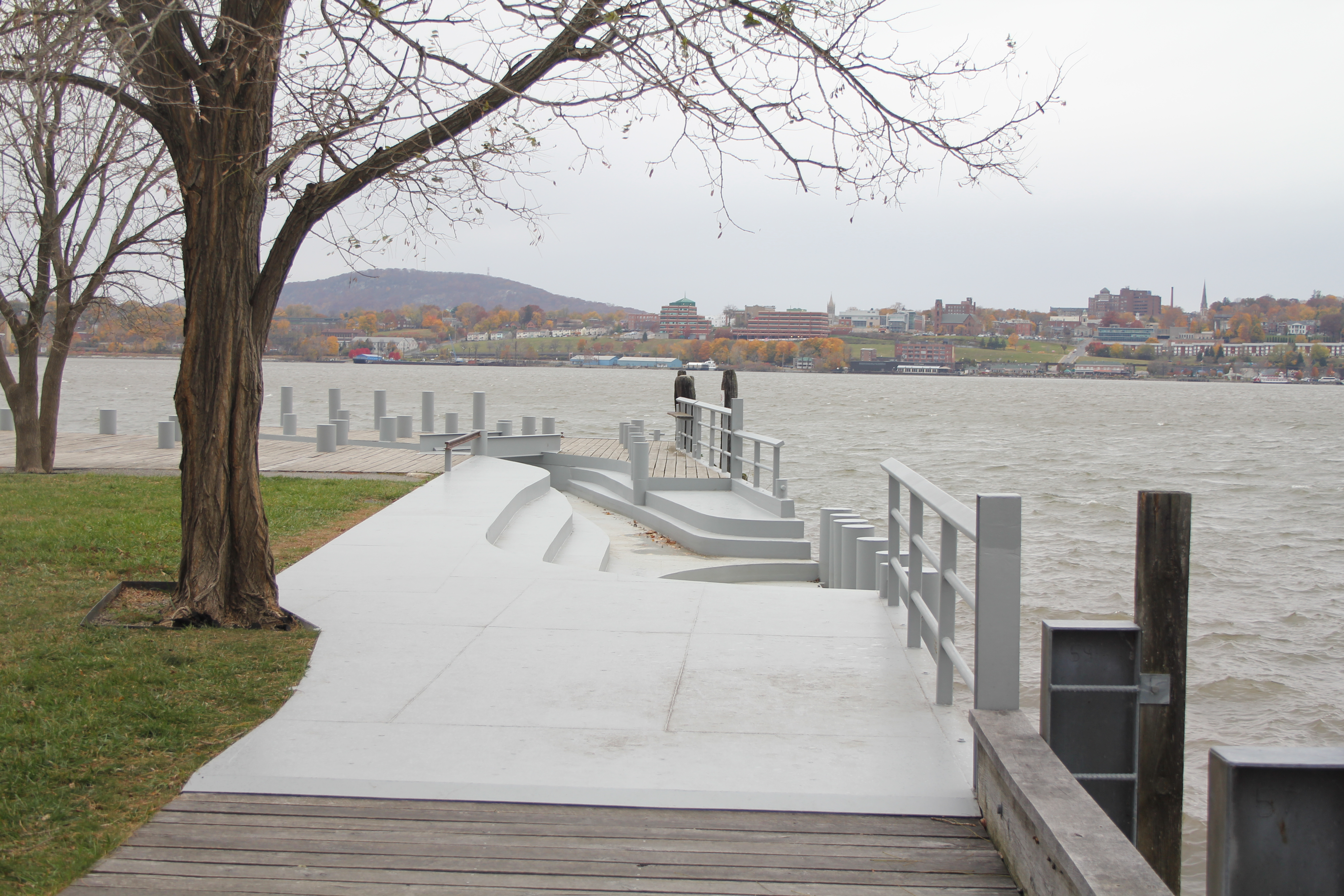
- Artist: George Trakas
- Year: 2007
- Medium: steel, wood, and concrete
- Movement: Environmental art
- Location: Long Dock Park, Beacon, New York; 41.503345°N 73.988807°W

Beacon Point is a permanent public artwork by George Trakas in Beacon, New York. Located on the Hudson River waterfront the work was inaugurated in 2007 by the Dia Art Foundation and built in collaboration with Scenic Hudson and Minetta Brook. Beacon Point was previously listed as one of Dia's sites they managed but is no longer considered as such.

== Design ==
Beacon Point is situated in the Peter J. Sharp Park within the larger Long Dock Park, in Beacon, New York. The 23-acre Long Dock Park was an abandoned railroad marine landing before its adaptation into a public park by Scenic Hudson.

Located on the north side and western tip of the park's peninsula, Beacon Point consists of a series of decks, pathways, and stairs constructed of both steel and wood. Dia describes these elements as, "a series of gradual cascading steps which recall the forms of undulating waves." These curving and undulating forms step down into the Hudson River, interacting with the rivers currents and tidal changes.

The most prominent feature of Beacon Point is a diagonal steel channel dividing the curving boardwalk. This slightly sloping channel flares at each end forming curving steps which allow the river water through. The Architect's Newspaper notes that the surrounding boardwalk is, "studded with a whimsically large number of concrete footings."

Beyond this channel The artwork also includes a terraced angling deck, a boardwalk, a restored bulkhead, and a restored southern shoreline of the peninsula.

Trakas states he designed the work “to play with the existing environment.” While the structure is designed for humans to enjoy, muskrats, crabs, and a variety of fish are noted as using the space as well.

== History ==
Dia Art Foundation and Scenic Hudson began discussions with George Trakas in 1999 about opportunities to create water-access in relation to the construction of the nearby Dia Beacon art museum. Over the next several years Trakas worked with the environmental organization Scenic Hudson and the public art organization Minetta Brook to integrate his work with the overall design and environmental remediation of the chosen location, a peninsula jutting out into the Hudson. Trakas described the condition of the peninsula when he first saw it in a New York Times article with :

“When I got here it was totally overgrown. There were just mounds of weeds, poison ivy, locusts. There were little trails that led out to this point, but the point at high tide was full of water. At low tide it was the exposed stumps of pilings and a lot of industrial refuse.”

In 2001 the peninsula underwent a large-scale clean-up of debris and brush and tree pruning. Shortly after this clean up the Trakas designed boardwalk and steel deck were installed. The full artwork was inaugurated as a permanent public artwork six years later, in October 2007, by the Dia Art Foundation.
