= Susan Rothenberg =

American artist (1945–2020)

- Rothenberg in May 1988
- Born: Susan Charna Rothenberg; January 20, 1945; Buffalo, New York, U.S.
- Died: May 18, 2020 (aged 75); Galisteo, New Mexico, U.S.
- Education: Cornell University
- Known for: Contemporary art
- Spouses: George Trakas (m. 1971; div. 1979) Bruce Nauman (m. 1989–2020)
- Awards: Guggenheim Fellowship for Fine Arts (1980), Rolf Schock Prizes in Visual Arts (2003)

Susan Charna Rothenberg (January 20, 1945 – May 18, 2020) was an American contemporary painter, printmaker, sculptor, and draughtswoman. She became known as an artist through her iconic images of the horse, which synthesized the opposing forces of abstraction and representation.

== Early life and education ==
Rothenberg was born in Buffalo, New York, on January 20, 1945, the daughter of Adele (Cohen), a president of the Buffalo Red Cross, and Leonard Rothenberg, who owned a supermarket chain.

In 1965, she graduated from Cornell University in Ithaca, New York, with a Bachelor of Fine Arts degree. In 1967, she went to Washington, D.C., and studied at George Washington University and the Corcoran Museum School.

== Career ==
Untitled (Horse) (1976)

Dominos-Cold (2001) at The Phillips Collection in 2023

In 1969, she moved to New York City, where she became a member of a dedicated community of artists. Through large acrylic paintings featuring emblematic, life-sized images of horses, largely monochromatic, she established her reputation in the New York art world in the early 1970s.

Rothenberg's first solo exhibition in New York in 1975 was at the 112 Greene Street Gallery. Consisting of three large-scale paintings of horses, it was heralded for introducing imagery into minimalist abstraction, while bringing a new sensitivity to figuration. Critic Peter Schjeldahl called the show "a eureka," stating that "the large format of the pictures was a gesture of ambition," and that "the mere reference to something really existing was astonishing."

From the mid-1970s on Rothenberg has been recognized as one of the most innovative and independent artists of her period of contemporary art. During an era when minimalism was at the forefront of the New York Art scene, she stood out because of her reintroduction of expression and figuration. Rothenberg's horse figures of the 70s contained some degree of minimalism because of their repetitive qualities, her hectic yet loose rendering of the figures blended the earlier conventions of abstract expressionism and color field painting. By the early 1980s, she was focusing on disembodied heads and body parts, and by the end of the decade she was painting complex and symbolic figurative works full of color and movement. In 1980, Rothenberg received a Guggenheim Fellowship for Fine Arts.

After moving to a ranch near Galisteo, New Mexico, her paintings reflected life in the Southwestern United States and became suffused with color. Beginning in the 1990s, she used the "memory of observed and experienced events" (a riding accident, a near-fatal bee sting, and other events) as the inspiration for her subjects and adopted oil paint as her favored medium. As in her earlier works, these paintings are distinguished by thickly layered, energetic brushwork and exhibit her interest in exploring the relationship between images and surface.

In 2010, New York Times art critic David Belcher wrote that comparisons between Rothenberg and Georgia O'Keeffe had "become hard to avoid." From her early years in SoHo through her move to New Mexico's desert landscape, Rothenberg has remained as influenced and challenged by her physical surroundings as she is by artistic issues and personal experiences. In addition to her earliest horse paintings, Rothenberg has taken on numerous forms as subject matter, such as dancing figures, heads and bodies, animals, and atmospheric landscapes. Rothenberg's visceral canvases have continued to evolve, as she explores the boundary between figural representation and abstraction; her work also examines the role of color and light, and the translation of her personal experience to a painterly surface.

However, Rothenberg has challenged these comparisons to O'Keeffe, stating that they are "completely different people" with different artistic energies. Though they both gained inspiration from the New Mexico landscape, Rothenberg's paintings contain a significantly more aggressive quality.

Rothenberg also made crucial contributions to the medium of drawing. Her 2004 exhibition of drawings at Sperone Westwater Gallery were described by Robert Storr as, "...fundamentally, drawing is as much a matter of evocation as it is of depiction, of identifying the primary qualities of things in the world and transposing them without a loss of quiddity. This at any rate is what drawing has been for Rothenberg."

== Exhibitions ==
Rothenberg's work has been the subject solo exhibitions throughout the United States and abroad. Her first major survey, initiated by the Los Angeles County Museum of Art, traveled to the San Francisco Museum of Modern Art, the Carnegie Institute, and the Tate Gallery, London, among other institutions (1983–1985). More recent exhibitions of her work include a retrospective organized by Albright-Knox Art Gallery in Buffalo, New York (1992–1994), which traveled to Washington, D.C., St. Louis, Chicago, and Seattle (1992); a retrospective at the Museo de Arte Contemporáneo in Monterrey, Mexico (1996); a survey of prints and drawings presented by the Herbert F. Johnson Museum of Art, Cornell University (1998); and Susan Rothenberg: Paintings from the Nineties at The Museum of Fine Arts, Boston (1999).

Her 1976 work Butterfly was displayed in the Treaty Room of the White House during the Obama administration.

Rothenberg's work was included in the 2022 exhibition Women Painting Women at the Modern Art Museum of Fort Worth.

== Awards ==
Rothenberg was the recipient of the National Endowment for the Arts Fellowship Grant (1979), the Cornell University Alumni Award (1998), the Skowhegan Medal for Painting (1998), and Sweden's Rolf Schock Prize (2003).

== Art markets ==
From 1987 until her death, Rothenberg was represented by Sperone Westwater, and the gallery then represented her estate. Since 2025, the estate has been represented by Hauser & Wirth.

The two highest prices at auction for Rothenberg’s work were set for paintings of horses. In 2024, her painting United States II (1976) from the collection of Donald L. Bryant Jr. sold for $1.99 million at Christie’s, New York.

== Personal life and death ==
Rothenberg was married to sculptor George Trakas from 1971 to 1979. The couple have a daughter, Maggie, born in 1972.

Susan married artist Bruce Nauman in 1989. Her relationship with Nauman, another prominent artist, has prompted more associations with Georgia O'Keeffe, because of the celebrated O'Keeffe relationship with Alfred Stieglitz.

Rothenberg died at her home in Galisteo, New Mexico, on May 18, 2020, at age 75.

== Museum exhibitions ==
- 1976, The Sable-Castelli Gallery, Toronto. Susan Rothenberg, April 10–24, 1976.
- 1976, Willard Gallery, New York. Susan Rothenberg, April, 10-May 8, 1976.
- 1977, Willard Gallery, New York. Susan Rothenberg, April 2 – May 5, 1977.
- 1978, University Art Museum, University of California, Berkeley, Susan Rothenberg, Matrix/Berkeley 3, January 20 – April 20, 1978. Brochure.
- 1978 "Susan Rothenberg, Recent Work," Walker Art Center, Minneapolis, Minnesota, 20 May – July 2 (catalogue)
- 1978, Greenberg Gallery, St. Louis. Susan Rothenberg, May 1 – June 30, 1978.
- 1979, Willard Gallery, New York. Susan Rothenberg, March 24 – April 19, 1979.
- 1980, Mayor Gallery, London. Susan Rothenberg: Recent Paintings, February 12 – March 15, 1980. Traveled to Galerie Rudolf Zwirner, Cologne, April 25 – May 24, 1980.
- 1981, Willard Gallery, New York. Susan Rothenberg: Five Heads, April 11 – May 16, 1981.
- 1981–1982 “Susan Rothenberg,” Kunsthalle Basel, Switzerland, October 3 – November 15; Frankfurter Kunstverein, Frankfurt, December 7 – January 31; Louisiana Museum, Humlebaek, Denmark, March 13 – 2 May (catalogue); “Susan Rothenberg,” Akron Art Museum, Ohio, November 21 – January 10
- 1982 “Susan Rothenberg: Recent Paintings,” Stedelijk Museum, Amsterdam, October 14 – November 29 (catalogue)
- 1983, Willard Gallery, New York. Susan Rothenberg, March 19 – April 23, 1983.
- 1983–1985 “Susan Rothenberg,” Los Angeles County Museum of Art, California, September 1 – October 16; San Francisco Museum of Art, California, November 10 – December 25; Museum of Art, Carnegie Institute, Pittsburgh, January 18 – March 18, 1984; Institute of Contemporary Art, Boston, April 10 – June 3; Aspen Center for the Visual Arts, Colorado, July 1 – August 19; Detroit Institute of Arts, Michigan, September 9 – October 21; Tate Gallery, London, November 21 – January 20, 1985; Virginia Museum of Fine Arts, Richmond, February 26 – March 27 (catalogue); “Currents,” ICA, Boston, April.
- 1984, Barbara Krakow Gallery, Boston, Susan Rothenberg Prints: 1977-1984, March 10–29, 1984. Traveled to Davison Art Gallery, Wesleyan University, Middletown, Connecticut, October 31 – December 5, 1984. Catalogue.
- 1984, Institute of Contemporary Art, Boston. Currents: Susan Rothenberg, April 1984. Brochure.
- 1985 “Centric 13: Susan Rothenberg—Works on Paper,” University Art Museum, California State Center, Long Beach, March 12 – April 21; Des Moines Art Center, Iowa, June 21 – July 28 (catalogue); “Susan Rothenberg, Prints,” Des Moines Art Center, Iowa, September – October
- 1987, Larry Gagosian Gallery, New York. Susan Rothenberg: The Horse Paintings: 1974-1980, January 15 – February 28, 1987. Catalogue.
- 1987, Sperone Westwater, New York. Susan Rothenberg, October 17 – November 14, 1987. Catalogue.
- 1987-1988, The University of Iowa Museum, Iowa City. Heads, Hands, Horses: Susan Rothenberg Prints, November 21, 1987 - January 3, 1988. Brochure.
- 1988 “Drawing Now: Susan Rothenberg,” Baltimore Museum of Art, Maryland, February 23 – April 4.
- 1988 Galerie Gian Enzo Sperone, Rome, June - July 1988.
- 1990 “Susan Rothenberg,” Rooseum Center for Contemporary Art, Malmo, Sweden, June 30 – August 17, 1990 (catalogue).
- 1992–94 "Susan Rothenberg, Paintings and Drawings, 1974–1992," Albright Knox Art Gallery, Buffalo, November 14, 1992 – January 3 *1993; Hirshhorn Museum and Sculpture Garden, Washington, D.C., February 10 – May 9, 1993: The Saint Louis Art Museum, Saint Louis, MO., 27 May – July 25, 1993; Museum of Contemporary Art, Chicago, August 20 – October 24, 1993; Seattle Art Museum, Seattle, WA., November 17 – January 9, 1994; The Dallas Museum of Art, Dallas, TX, January 30 – March 27, 1994 (catalogue).
- 1995 "Focus Series," Virginia Museum of Fine Arts, Richmond, VA, February 18 – July 2
- 1996–97 "Susan Rothenberg," MARCO, Museo de Arte Contemporaneo de Monterrey, Monterrey, Mexico, October 4, 1996 – January 19, 1997 (catalogue).
- 1998–99 "Susan Rothenberg: Drawings and Prints," Herbert F. Johnson Museum of Art, Cornell University, Ithaca, NY, August 22 – October 25; The Contemporary Museum, Honolulu, HI, January 15 – March 14; Museum of Fine Arts, Santa Fe, NM, March 21 – 24 May (catalogue).
- 1999–2000 "Susan Rothenberg: Paintings from the 90's," Museum of Fine Arts, Boston, MFA, November 18, 1999 – January 17, 2000 (Catalogue).
- 2009–2010 "Susan Rothenberg: Moving In Place," Modern Art Museum of Fort Worth, TX, October 18, 2009 – January 3, 2010.
- 2016 "Susan Rothenberg," Sperone Westwater, New York, NY, November 4 – December 20, 2016.
