= Willoughby Sharp =

American artist, curator, publisher, gallerist, teacher, author and telecom activist

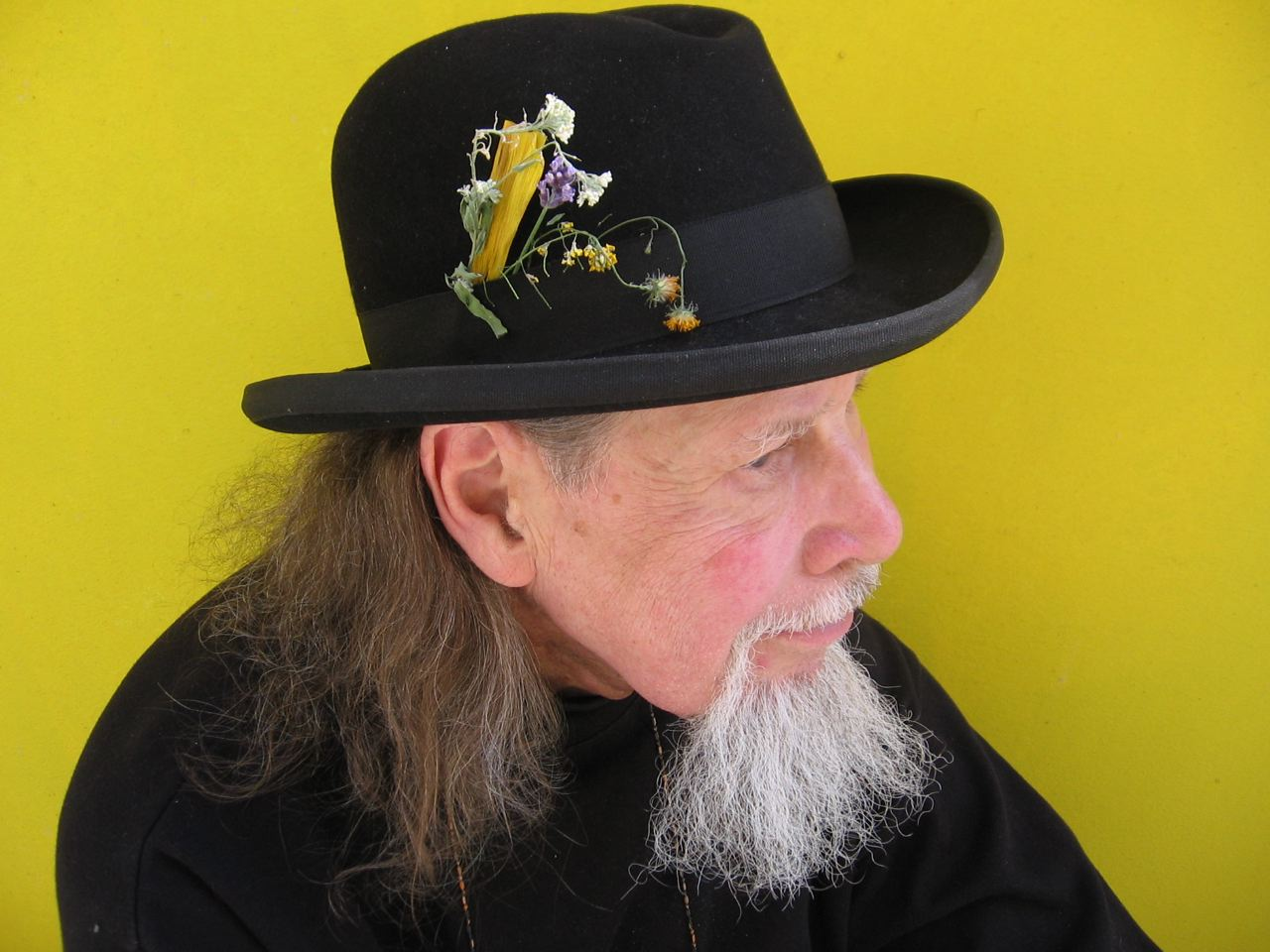
- Sharp in 2006
- Born: January 23, 1936
- Died: December 17, 2008 (aged 72)
- Education: Brown University (BA)
- Spouse: Pamela Seymour Smith Sharp
- Children: Saskia Sharp

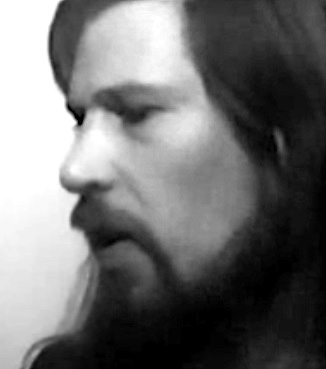
Willoughby Sharp in 1973

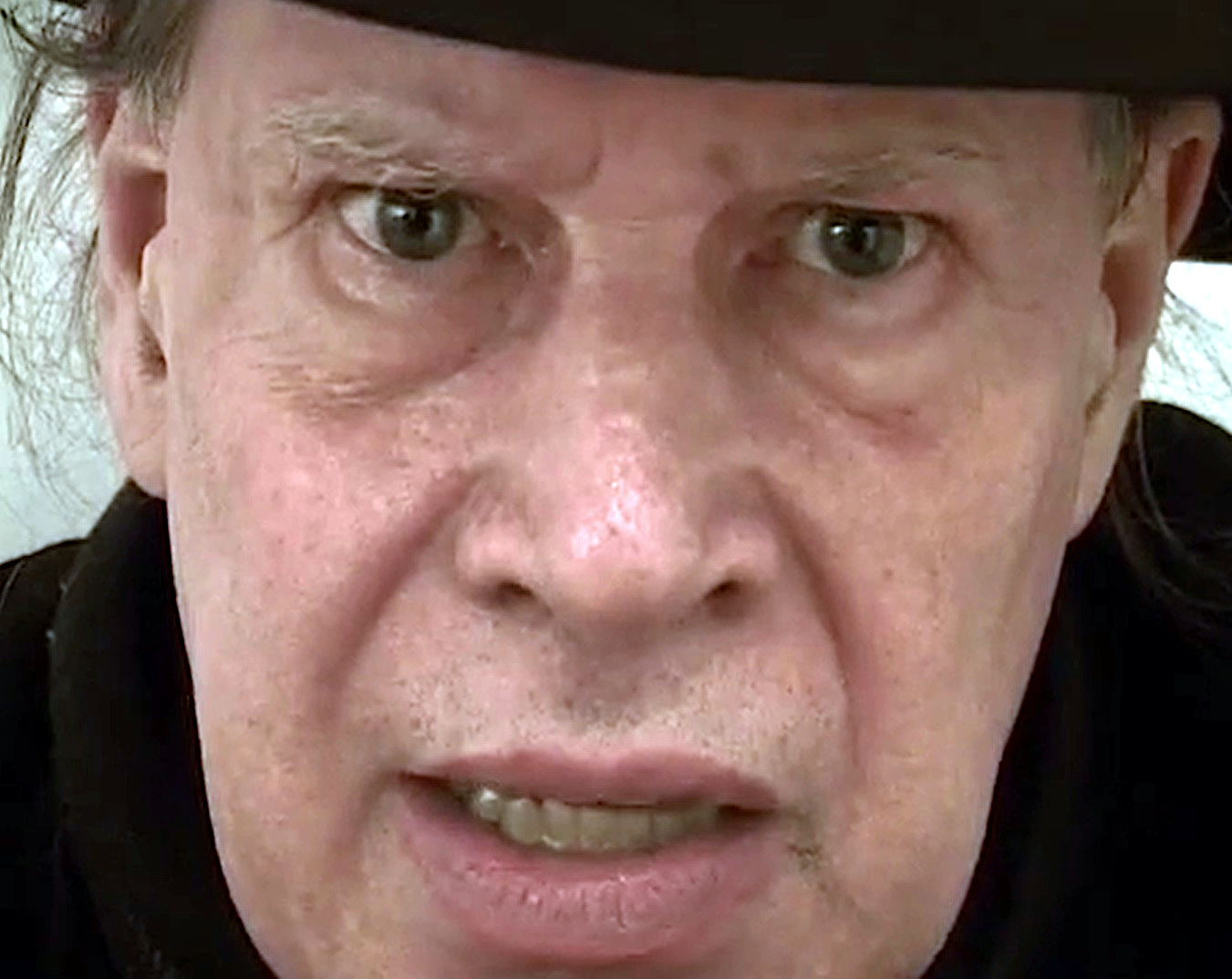
Willoughby Sharp 2002

Willoughby Sharp (January 23, 1936 – December 17, 2008) was an American artist, independent curator, independent publisher (he was co-founder and co-editor of Avalanche Magazine with Liza Béar), gallerist, teacher, author, and telecom activist. Avalanche published interviews they conducted with contemporary artists such as Vito Acconci, Dennis Oppenheim and Yvonne Rainer. Sharp also was contributing editor to four other publications: Impulse (1979–1981); Video magazine (1980–1982); Art Com (1984–1985), and the East Village Eye (1984–1986). He published three monographs on contemporary artists, contributed to many exhibition catalogues, and wrote on art for Artforum, Art in America, Arts magazine, Laica Journal, Quadrum and Rhobo. He was editor of the Public Arts International/Free Speech documentary booklet in 1979. Sharp received numerous grants, awards, and fellowships; both as an individual or under the sponsorship of non-profit arts organizations.

== Education ==
Sharp was born and raised in New York City. He received his BA from Brown University in 1957, where he studied art history. He then undertook graduate study in art history at the University of Paris (1957–58), the University of Lausanne (1958–59), finishing at Columbia University, where he studied under Meyer Schapiro. Sharp wrote his graduate thesis on kinetic art.

== Solo exhibitions ==
Beginning in 1969, Sharp had more than twenty solo exhibitions at museums, and art galleries such as: Brown University; the University Art Museum, Berkeley, California; The Museum of Conceptual Art, San Francisco; CAYA, Buenos Aires, Argentina; the University of Iowa; the Ontario College of Art, Toronto; the University of California, Los Angeles; the Vancouver Art Gallery, and Pumps Gallery, Vancouver. His work has also been seen in many group shows in the United States, Canada, Europe and Asia. In February 1969, at the invitation of Hans Haacke, he presented a three-part video installation, “Earthscopes,” at Cooper Union, which included a video catalogue of the historic “Earth Art” exhibition that he curated at the Andrew Dickson White Museum of Art at Cornell University. In March 1969, Sharp created “Einstein’s Eye,” a closed-circuit b/w video sculpture exhibited at the Richard L. Feigen Gallery in New York City.

== Career ==
Sharp began his media work in 1967 by shooting films in 8mm, Super 8mm, and 16mm including “Earth,” (1968, Collection: Museum of Fine Arts, Boston) and “Place & Process,” (1969, Collection: MoMA, New York). After these films, he produced a body of video works in 1/2, 3/4 and 1-inch tape. These works included video sculpture, video installations, “Videoviews,” (1970–1974), Video performances (1973–1977), cable television programs (1985–1986), and broadcast TV programs (2001–2008). In 1970 Sharp's film “Place and Process” was included in MoMA’s “INFORMATION” exhibition curated by Kynaston McShine. Also in 1970, Sharp curated “Body Works,” an exhibition of Video art with works by Vito Acconci, Bruce Nauman, Terry Fox, Keith Sonnier, Dennis Oppenheim and William Wegman at Tom Marioni's Museum of Conceptual Art, San Francisco, California. In 1971, Sharp created Points of View: A Taped Conversation with Four Painters, for Arts Magazine, a live interview with painters: Ronnie Landfield, Brice Marden, Larry Poons, and John Walker.

Between 1970 and 1972, Sharp began work on the “Videoviews”, a series of dialogues with artists using one of the first Sony 3400 Porta-Pac video recording systems at San Jose State TV studios. The series consists of Sharp's dialogues with Bruce Nauman (1970), Joseph Beuys (1972), Vito Acconci (1973), Chris Burden (1973), Lowell Darling (1974), and Dennis Oppenheim (1974). Later, while working with ARTENGINE, N.Y., Sharp produced a series of 30-minute documentary programs on Dennis Oppenheim (2001), Keith Sonnier (2002), Earle Brown (2002), and Morton Subotnick (2003). In 1976, under an NEA grant to Center for New Art Activities, Inc., he co-produced with Liza Béar Five Video Pioneers: Vito Acconci, Richard Serra, Willoughby Sharp, Keith Sonnier, William Wegman (Collection: MoMA, N.Y.). That year, he also represented the United States in the Venice Biennale. Shortly afterward, Sharp began production on a series of international, multi-casting, pre-Internet projects which simultaneously interlaced information from computers, telefax, In September 1977, he participated in Send/Receive Satellite Network: Phase II, co-produced and directed by Keith Sonnier and Liza Béar in collaboration with a group of San Francisco and New York artists; this was the first trans-continental interactive satellite work made by artists. His participation in Send/Receive in part led to Sharp's current preoccupation with global collaborative work through a series of interactive telecommunications and streaming transmissions. This ongoing series of projects honors the accomplishments of electrical geniuses Guglielmo Marconi (1981), Heinrich Hertz (1986) and Nikola Tesla (2005–2006). In 2006, his interview with Serkan Ozkaya (conceptual artist) has been published under the title Have You Ever Done Anything Right? in English and Spanish, by Kuenstlerhaus Bethanien and Smart Art Press.

In 1985 Sharp appeared regularly on his The Willoughby Sharp Show that broadcast on public-access television Channel D on Manhattan Cable Television.

Sharp's video and film works are in the collections of the Museum of Modern Art New York; the Solomon R. Guggenheim Museum; ZKM (Zentrum fur Kunst und Medientechnologie) in Karlsruhe, Germany; The Collection of the Venice Biennale, Venice, Italy; The Museum of Fine Arts; the Rhode Island School of Design; the National Art Gallery in Ottawa; The Western Front in Vancouver and in private collections worldwide.

=== Collaboration with Joseph Beuys ===
In 1958, Sharp met Joseph Beuys in Düsseldorf and maintained a close, collaborative relationship until Beuys' death in 1986. Sharp was influential in bringing Beuys’ work to the attention of the American art world. Starting with an Artforum interview (December, 1969), Beuys was also featured in the first issue of Avalanche magazine (1970). In 1972, Sharp produced the Beuys Videoview which constituted Beuys’ first solo show at Ronald Feldman Fine Arts, Inc., N.Y. He also produced Public Dialogue in which Beuys performed as part of the Videoperformance exhibition Sharp curated din 1974. In 1974, at Beuys’ request, Sharp videotaped I Like America, America Likes Me, his performance at the Rene Block Gallery, New York City, which has been released as America (1974–2003). In 1979, Beuys invited Sharp to curate the film/video sections of his retrospective at the Solomon R. Guggenheim Museum and while Beuys was in New York, Sharp suggested he visit and support the turmoil around The Real Estate Show and even took Beuys to the Mudd Club one night.

== Teaching career ==
Sharp taught on the faculties of the School of Visual Arts, Humanities and Science Department (1984–1988); the University of Rhode Island, Kingston, where he was also the director of the Fine Arts Center (1988–1990); and the New School University, Parsons The New School for Design, Graduate Faculty, Digital Design Department, N.Y. (2000–2003).

== Curatorial work ==
Beginning in 1964, Sharp curated numerous exhibitions, including:

- 1964 POP ART: AN ART HISTORICAL APPROACH, Columbia University, NY. No Catalogue.
- 1964 ROBERT RAUSCHENBERG, Museum Haus Lange, Krefeld, Germany. Catalogue.
- 1966 GUNTHER UECKER, Alfred Schmela Gallery, Düsseldorf, Germany. Catalogue.
- 1966 GUNTHER UECKER, Howard Wise Gallery, NY. Catalogue.
- 1966 KINETIC AND PROGRAMMED ART, November 25 – December 4, 1966. Rhode Island School of Design, Museum of Art, Providence. Brochure.
- 1967 SLOW-MOTION, Rutgers University, NJ. Catalogue.
- 1967 LIGHT–MOTION-SPACE, Walker Art Center, Minneapolis, MN. and the Milwaukee Art Center, Milwaukee, WI. Catalogue.

Front cover, LUMINISM exhibition catalogue, 1967

- 1967 LUMINISM, The Artists Club, NY. Catalogue.
- 1968–1969 AIR ART, Arts Council, YM/YWHA, Philadelphia, PA; traveled to: Contemporary Arts Center, Cincinnati, OH; Lakeview Center for the Arts and Sciences, Peoria, Illinois; University Art Museum, University of California, Berkeley, CA; Lamont Gallery, Phillips Exeter Academy, Exeter, NH; Edmonton Art Gallery, Edmonton, Alberta, Canada. Catalogue.
- 1968 KINETICISM: SYSTEMS SCULPTURE IN ENVIRONMENTAL SITUATIONS (Official Olympic Games Exhibition), University Museum of Arts and Science, Mexico City, Mexico. Catalogue.
- 1969 EARTH ART, Andrew Dickson White Museum of Art, Cornell University, Ithaca, NY. Catalogue.
- 1969 PLACE & PROCESS, The Edmonton Art Gallery, Alberta, Canada. No catalogue.
- 1970 BODY WORKS an exhibition of Video art presented at Tom Marioni's Museum of Conceptual Art, San Francisco, California.
- 1970 THIS IS YOUR ROOF exhibition is presented at the international art festival held in Pamplona, Spain.
- 1971 PIER 18, a site/non-site exhibition on an abandoned Pier on Manhattan's West Side.
- 1971 Vito Acconci, Claim, 93 Grand Street, NY. Performance.
- 1971 William Beckley, 93 Grand Street. Performance
- 1971 Terry Fox, Yeast, 93 Grand Street, NY. Videotaped performance.
- 1973 JOSEPH BEUYS, Ronald Feldman Fine Arts, Inc., NY. Beuys’ first show in the U.S. No catalogue.
- 1973 AVALANCHE DIE ENTWICKLUNG EINER AVANTGARDE-ZEITSCHRIFT, Cologne Kunstverein; traveled to: Hanover Kunstverein; Munster Kunstverein; Frankfurt Kunstverein. No catalogue.
- 1974 VIDEOPERFORMANCE, 112 Greene Street, Gallery, NY. Catalogue: Avalanche magazine Issue Number 9.
- 1979–1980 Joseph Beuys, Guggenheim Retrospective, curated the film/video section. Catalogue.
- 1984 Joseph Nechvatal, Machine Language Book by Willoughby Sharp, 74 pages
- 1988–1991 WILLOUGHBY SHARP GALLERY.
- 1988 Lawrence Weiner, Fine Arts Center, University of Rhode Island, Kingston Rhode Island. No catalogue.
- 1989 Joan Jonas, Fine Arts Center, University of Rhode Island, Kingston Rhode Island. No catalogue.
- 1990 MICROSCULPTURE, Fine Arts Center, University of Rhode Island, Kingston, Rhode Island. Catalogue.
- 1990 Adrian Piper, Fine Arts Center, University of Rhode Island, Kingston, Rhode Island. No catalogue.
- 2003 POLARITIES, The Lobby Gallery, 1155 Avenue of the Americas, NY. Brochure.
- DAAD Berlin grant with Pamela Seymour Smith, (2006)
- Emily Harvey Foundation artists-in-residence grant with Pamela Seymour Smith (2006)
- ACE award (1986)
- Department of Communications, Canadian Government (1981)
- Canada Council, Explorations Department, (1981)
- National Endowment for the Arts (1976–1978, 1980–1981)
- New York State Council on the Arts (1975–1977, 1979, 1985)
- Rockefeller Foundation individual artists grant (1971)

== Body of work ==
- Joseph Beuys' America (1974–2003) 12 min
- Earle Brown By Artengine, New York (2002) 28 min
- Dennis Oppenheim By Artengine, New York (2001) 28 min
- Keith Sonnier By Artengine, New York (2002) 28 min
- Who Killed Heinrich Hertz? (1986–1987) 20 min
- Willoughby Sharp's Downtown New York (1986, in collaboration with Timothy Binkley, George M. Chaikin, Gretta Sarfaty and Ira Schneider) 58 min
- Art And Telecommunications (1983) 60 min
- The Space Shuttle Is A Robot (1983) 20 min
- Willoughby Sharp's Beta 1: DBS (1982) 20 min
- Five Video Pioneers: Acconci, Serra, Sharp, Sonnier & Wegman (1977) 30 min
- Two-Way Demo(1977) 20 min
- Willoughby Sharp Videoviews Chris Burden (1975) 27:45 min
- Art Stars in Hollywood: The DeccaDance (with Chip Lord and Megan Williams) (1974) 60 min
- Art Stars Interviews (with Chip Lord and Megan Williams) (1974) 60 min
- Joseph Beuys' Public Dialogue (1974) 120 min
- Willoughby Sharp's Videoperformances (1973–1974) 58 min
- Chris Burden Videoview (1973) 30 min
- Joseph Beuys Videoview (1973) 30 min
- Vito Acconci Videoview (1973) 30 min
