= Bill Beckley =

American artist (1946–2024)

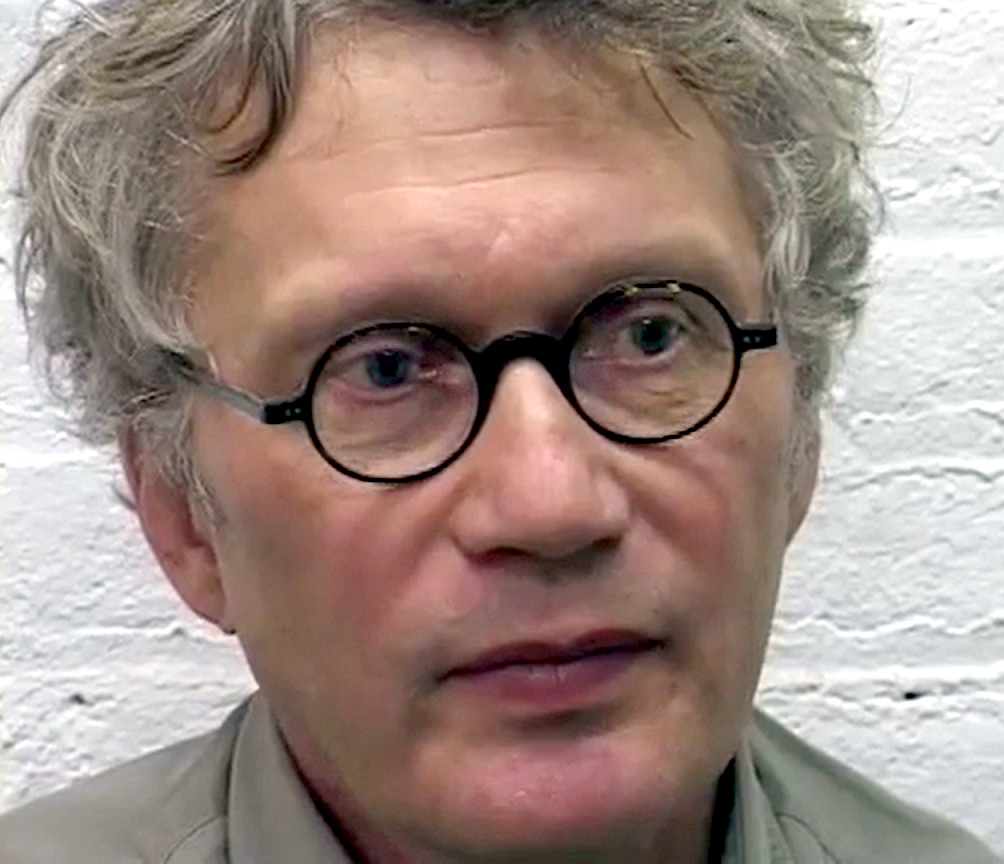
- Bill Beckley in Speaking Portraits
- Born: William G. Beckley Jr. February 11, 1946; Hamburg, Pennsylvania, United States
- Died: August 17, 2024 (aged 78); Kerhonkson, New York, United States
- Education: Kutztown University (BFA), Tyler School of Art (MFA)
- Occupations: Conceptual artist, narrative artist
- Spouses: Deirdre Williams (m. 1980; div. 1981) Laurie Johenning (m. 1986)
- Children: 2
- Website: bill-beckley.com

Bill Beckley (February 11, 1946 – August 17, 2024) was an American narrative and conceptual artist. In the early 1970s, he was one of the original artists at 112 Greene Street Workshop gallery in SoHo, New York City.

== Early life and education ==
Bill Beckley was born on February 11, 1946, in Hamburg, Pennsylvania, a small farming town in the Amish countryside. He started drawing at age five.

Beckley attended college at Kutztown University, and graduated with a BFA degree in 1968; and he received a Master of Fine Arts degree in 1970 from Tyler School of Art, Temple University. There he studied with Italo Scanga, who introduced him to former students and friends, including Bruce Nauman, Dan Flavin, Sol LeWitt, and Marcia Tucker, then a curator at the Whitney Museum.

Marcia Tucker introduced his work to Athena Tacha, a curator at the Allen Memorial Art Museum in Oberlin, Ohio, who included his work in “Art in the Mind” (1970), the first conceptual art exhibition in the United States. He moved from Philadelphia to New York City in the summer of 1970 and lived for a time on a sailboat off City Island. He was one of the artists (along with Gordon Matta Clark, Rafi Ferrer, Barry Le Va, Jeffery Lew, Bill Bollinger, and Alan Saret) who organized the first exhibition of the legendary gallery 112 Greene Street Workshop in SoHo, New York City in October 1970. In the fall of 1970 he met Louise Bourgeois, who was also working at 112 Greene Street; Vito Acconci; and Dennis Oppenheim, who became a lifelong friend.

== Work ==
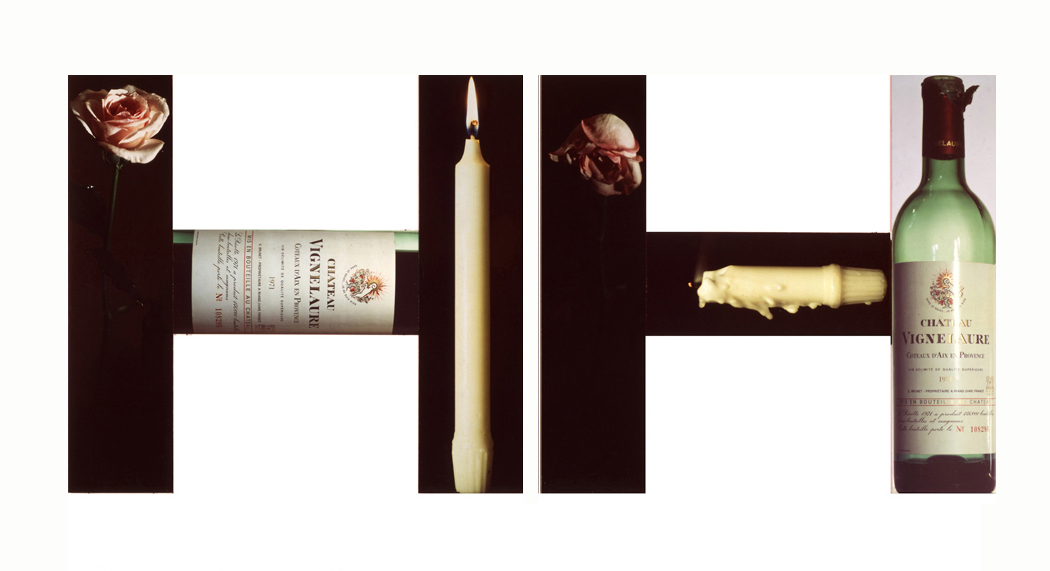
Elements of Romance, 1977

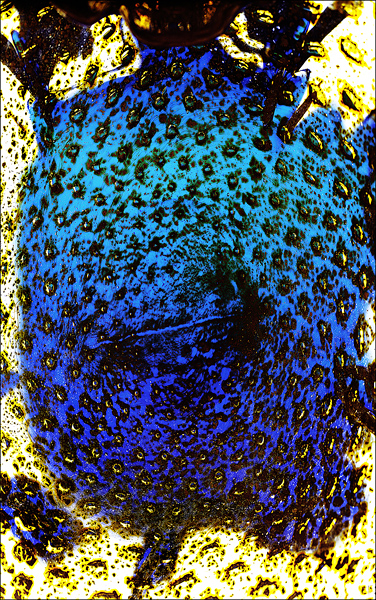
Oscar, 2010, cibachrome photograph, 77 by 48 inches (200 cm × 120 cm)

Beckley went on to exhibit with several European and American Galleries that showed conceptual art, photography, and texts. These included an exhibition with Gerhard Richter at the Rudolf Zwirner Gallery (Cologne, 1972), the Konrad Fischer Gallery (Düsseldorf, 1972), the Nigel Greenwood Gallery (London, 1972), the John Gibson Gallery (New York, 1973), the Yvon Lambert Gallery (Paris, 1974), and Galerie Hans Mayer, which has represented his work in Europe since 1975. He exhibited at the Paris Biennale in 1973; the Venice Biennale in 1975; at Documenta in Kassel, Germany, in 1976; and in the Whitney Biennial in 1979. The Museum of Modern Art showed his works in its Projects Room in 1979.

During the early seventies, Beckley was part of a loose-knit group of conceptual artists that used images and fictional texts in a form that came to be known as Narrative Art. The art dealer John Gibson organized the first group exhibition of these artists in 1973. It included David Askevald, John Baldessari, Peter Hutchinson, Jean Le Gac, Italo Scanga, David Tremlett, Ger van Elk, and William Wegman. Several Museum shows of this narrative work followed, including “Narrational Imagery: Beckley, Ruscha, Warhol” organized by Sam Hunter, at the University of Massachusetts Amherst; and “American Narrative/Story Art: 1967–1977” at the Contemporary Arts Museum in Houston.

In the early seventies, Beckley escaped from the black, white, and gray tonalities of early conceptualism. With his color photographs and references to advertising images, he influenced artists of the so-called Picture Generation like Richard Prince and Jeff Koons, whom he met at the above-mentioned Projects Room exhibition of color photographs at the Museum of Modern Art. From glimpses of himself and his obsessions, he assembled enigmatic works in which modular form and its permutations sometimes read as the story of a sexual relationship or as a baffling involuted image of sexuality itself.

More recent exhibitions include a 2008 show of works from 1971–73, among them his Silent Ping Pong Tables and Short Stories for Popsicles (both 1971), at Chelsea Space (London) in conjunction with the Tate Gallery; a 2010 retrospective exhibition titled “Etcetera” at the Tony Shafrazi Gallery in New York; and an exhibition of abstract color photographs at Galerie Hans Mayer, Düsseldorf, in September 2010, and 2014, and exhibitions at Albertz Benda Gallery, New York, 2014, 2016 and 2018; Studio Trisorio, Naples, 2016; Studio G7, Bologna; 2018; The University of the Arts, Philadelphia, 2018; and a solo show at Frieze, New York, 2018.

== Collections ==
His work is in the collections of the Museum of Modern Art; the Whitney Museum; the Guggenheim Museum, New York; the Smithsonian American Art Museum, Washington D.C.; the Tate Modern, London; the Daimler Collection in Stuttgart; Sammlung Hoffman in Berlin; and in the private collections of the Morton Neumann Family, Jeff Koons, and Sol LeWitt.

== Academe ==
During the nineteen nineties, Beckley edited Aesthetics Today, a series of books for the School of Visual Arts and Allworth Press. This included, among other books, Thomas McEvilley’s Shape of Ancient Thought, Robert C. Morgan’s The End of the Art World, and Beckley’s anthologies Uncontrollable Beauty and Sticky Sublime. In 2018 he spoke on his work at The University of Bologna, and he wrote a chapter for Contemporary Visual Culture and the Sublime, published by Routledge Press in 2018. He began teaching semiotics at the School of Visual Arts in 1970. Former students include John von Bergen, Mark Dion, and Keith Haring.

== Personal life and death ==
Beckley married Deirdre Williams, a costume designer for films, in 1980. They divorced in 1981. He married Laurie Johenning, a sculptor, in 1986. They had two sons, Tristan and Liam.

Bill Beckley died on August 17, 2024, at his home in Kerhonkson, New York. He was 78.
