= George Trakas =

American-Canadian artist

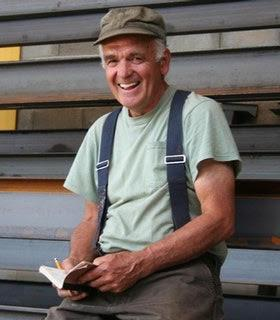
- Born: 1944 (age 81–82); Quebec City, Quebec, Canada
- Education: New York University, B.S., 1969
- Known for: Environmental Sculptor
- Spouse: Susan Rothenberg (m. 1971; div. 1979)

George Trakas is a sculptor who was born in Quebec City in 1944 and has lived in New York City since 1963. Many of his projects are site-specific installations, and he describes himself as an environmental sculptor. He often recycles local materials and incorporates them into his work. Trakas taught sculpture at Yale University for 13 years and has also taught at other schools.

== Education and honours ==
Trakas graduated from Sir George Williams University in Montreal and then went on to earn a bachelor's degree in art history at New York University in 1969. He received a Guggenheim Fellowship in 1982, a National Endowment for the Arts Fellowship in 1989, and the American Academy of Arts and Letters Medal for Sculpture in 1996. Emory University awarded him an honorary doctorate in 2011. He also won the Foundation for Contemporary Arts Grants to Artists award (2017).

== Personal life ==
George Trakas married Susan Rothenberg, a painter, in 1971. Their daughter Maggie was born in 1972. They divorced in 1979 but remained close until Rothenberg's death in 2020.

== Works ==
Notable recent examples of Trakas's work include a waterfront nature walk at the Newtown Creek Wastewater Treatment Plant in Brooklyn, New York; another waterfront installation adjacent to the Dia:Beacon museum in Beacon, New York; and public art in the New York City Subway at the Atlantic Avenue – Barclays Center station.

The following table contains a partial list of works by George Trakas.

Title	Location	Description	Year	References
Pont Épée	Thiers, France	Set of walkways and bridges on the Durolle river next to the "Creux-de-l'enfer"	1985	
Beacon Point	Beacon, New York	Angling deck, boardwalk, & restored bulkhead in Long Dock Park on a 25-acre peninsula adjacent to Dia:Beacon museum	2007	
The pathway of love	Santomato, Pistoia	A path made of iron and wood that crosses a romantic forest alongside a stream	1982	
Shoreline Nature Walkway	Brooklyn, New York	Nature walk adjacent to the Newtown Creek Wastewater Treatment Plant	2007	
Hook (Archean Reach), Line (Sea House), and Sinker (Mined Swell)	Brooklyn, New York	Public sculpture inside the Atlantic Avenue–Barclays Center station of the New York City Subway	2004	
Reconnections	Belmullet, Ireland	Footbridge across a canal in County Mayo that has since been replaced	1993	
Self Passage	Humlebæk, Denmark	Site-specific sculpture leading to a waterside platform, in the Louisiana Museum of Modern Art's sculpture park.	1989	
Berth Haven	Seattle, Washington	A cedar and steel lakeside deck on the premises of an NOAA facility. Rests on foundations remaining from the site’s prior use as navy airfield.	1983	
Source Route	Atlanta, Georgia	Site-specific sculpture in a wooded area of the Emory University campus	1979	

== Gallery ==
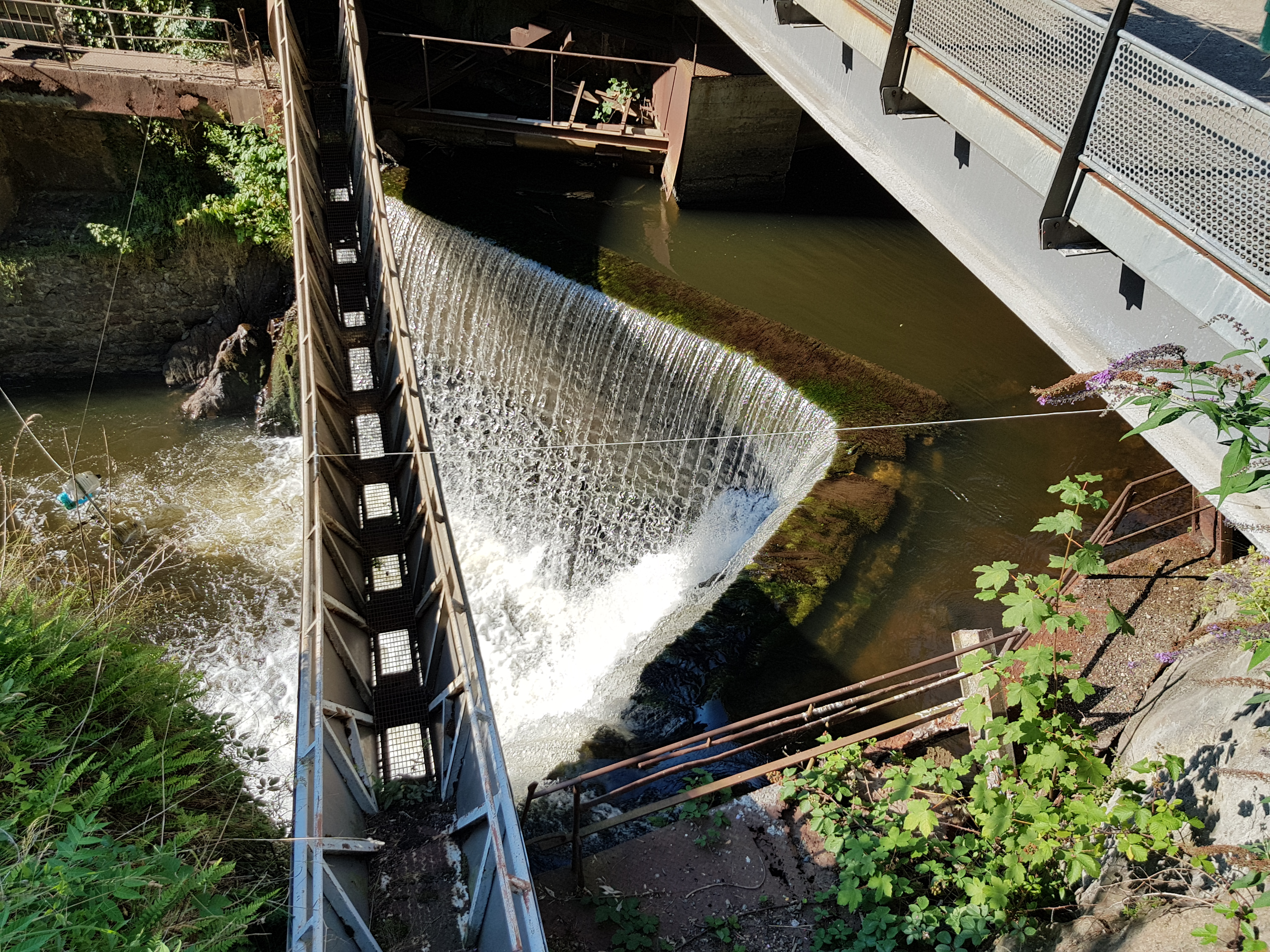
The "pont Epée" in Thiers.

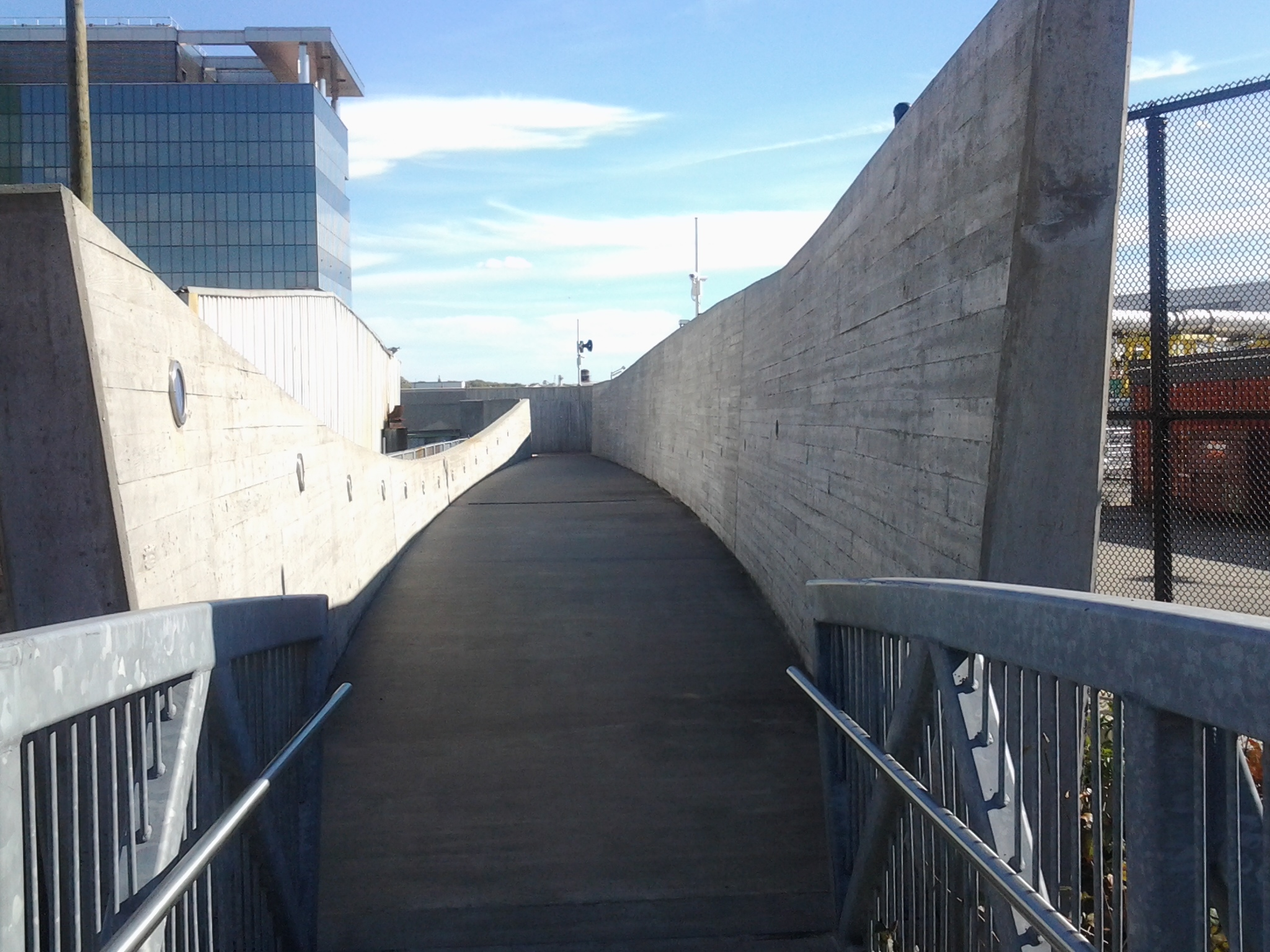
Newtown Creek Nature Walk: "Vessel" entrance

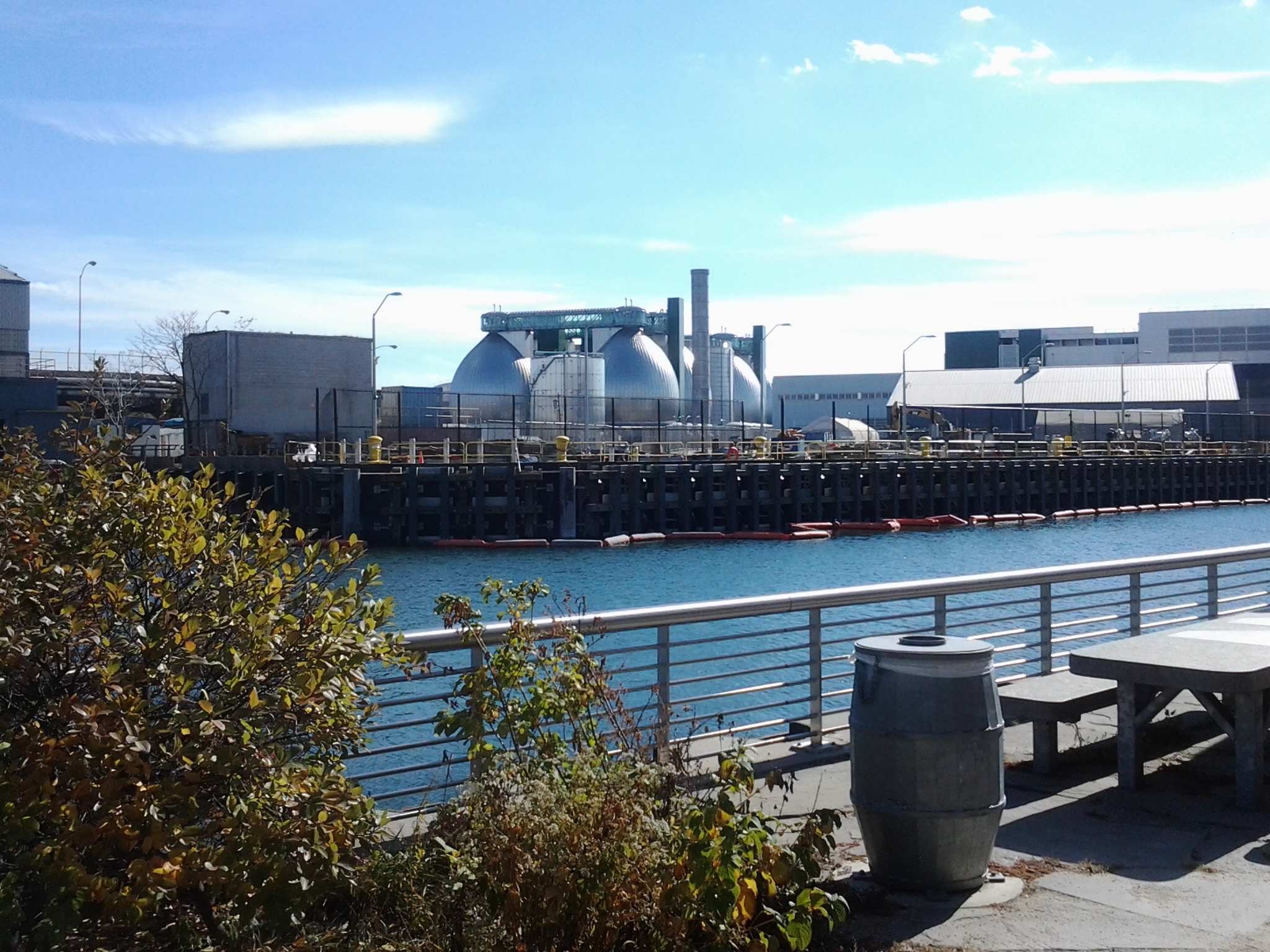
Newtown Creek Nature Walk: Whale Creek, sewage plant in distance

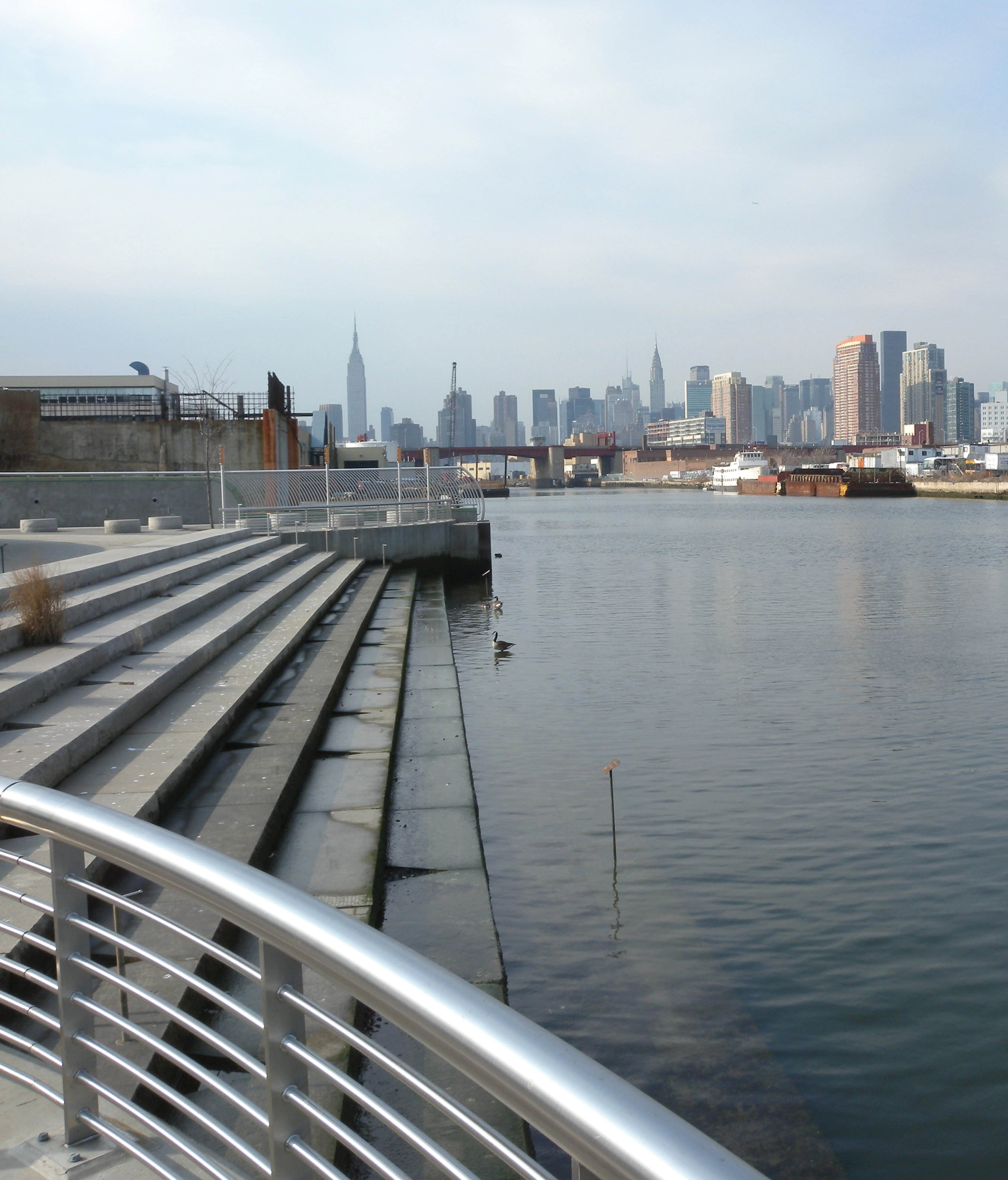
Newtown Creek Nature Walk: steps into the water

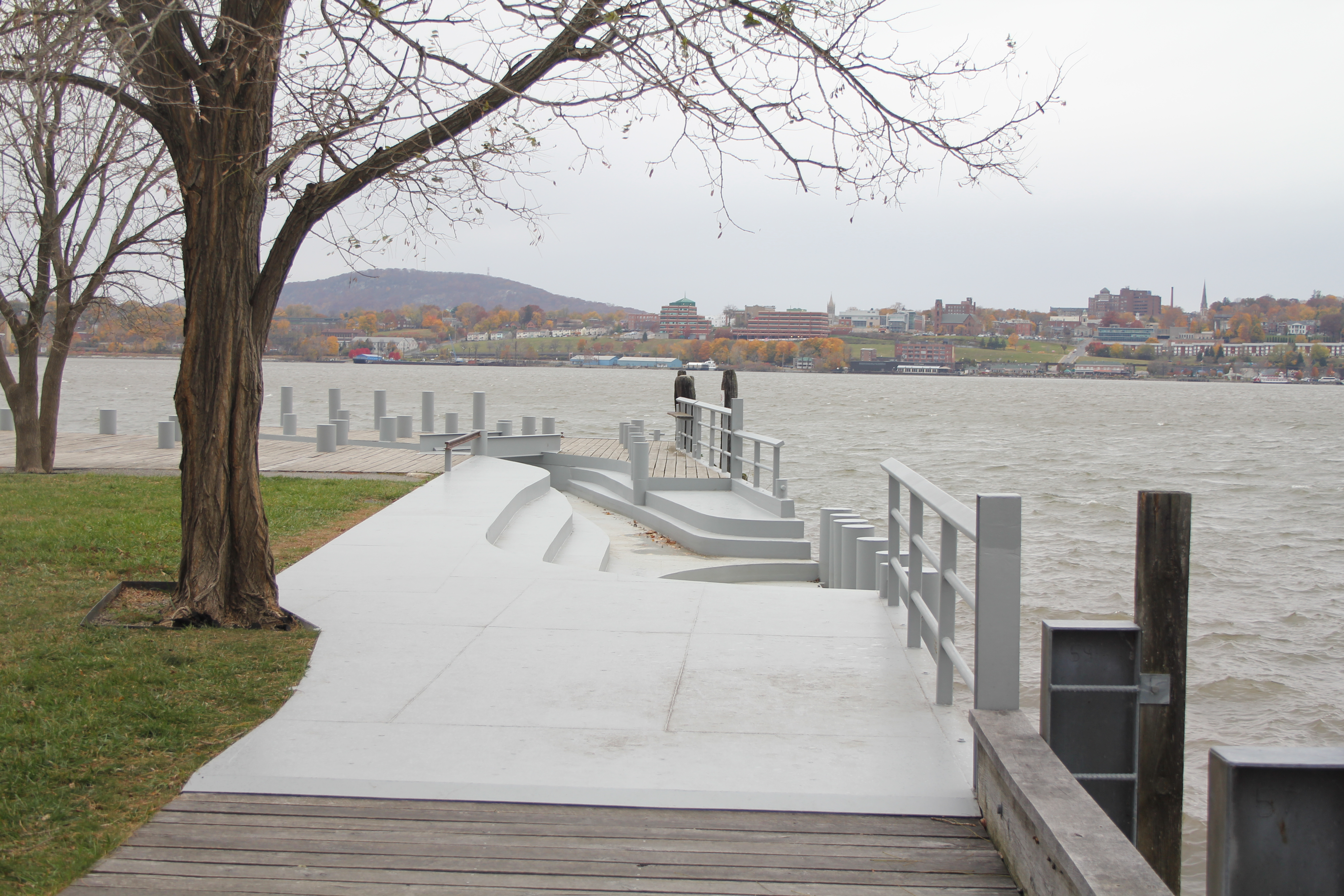
Beacon Point, view of entire site, looking westward toward Newburgh, NY.

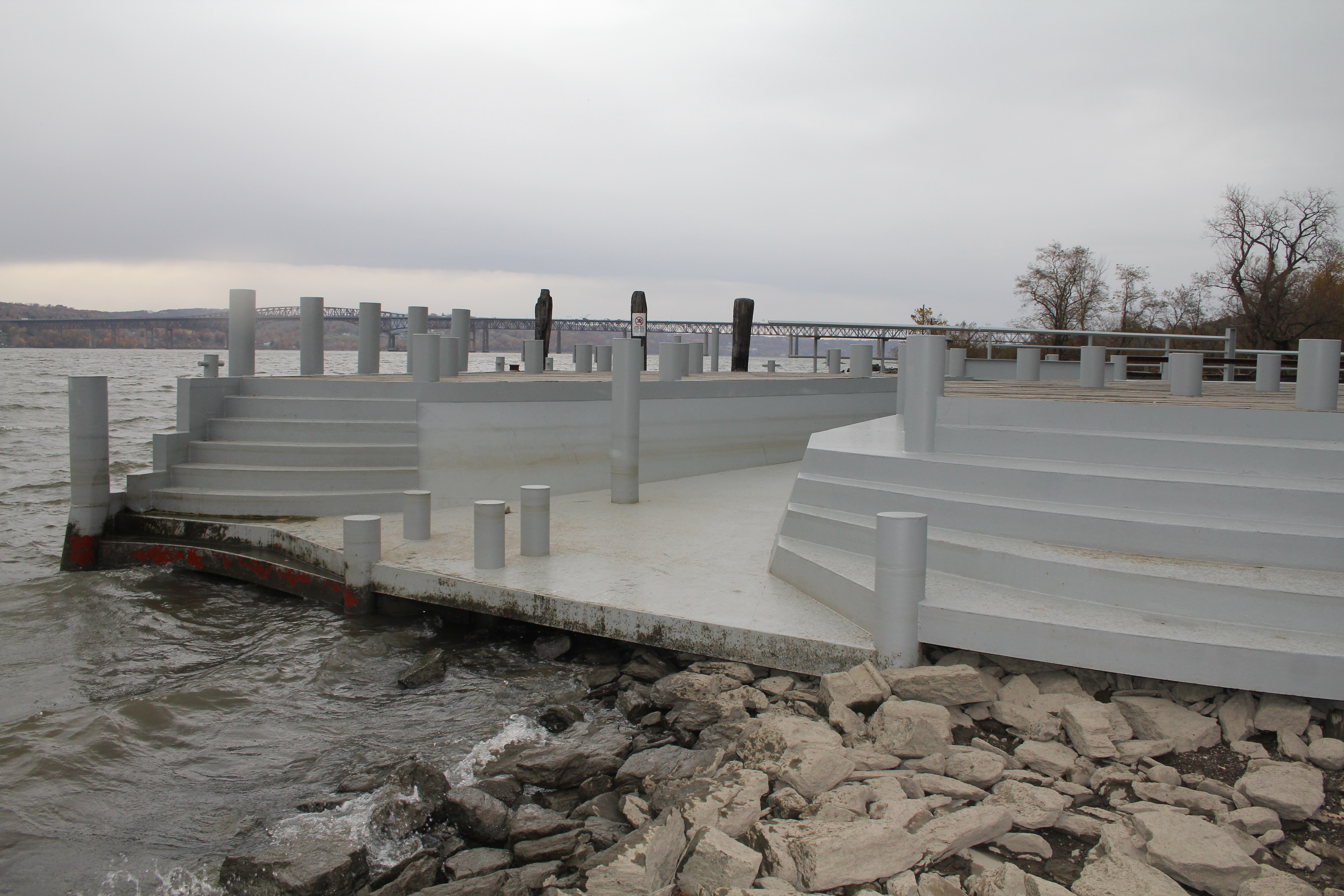
Beacon Point, looking northward, showing mouth of channel that runs through the piece.

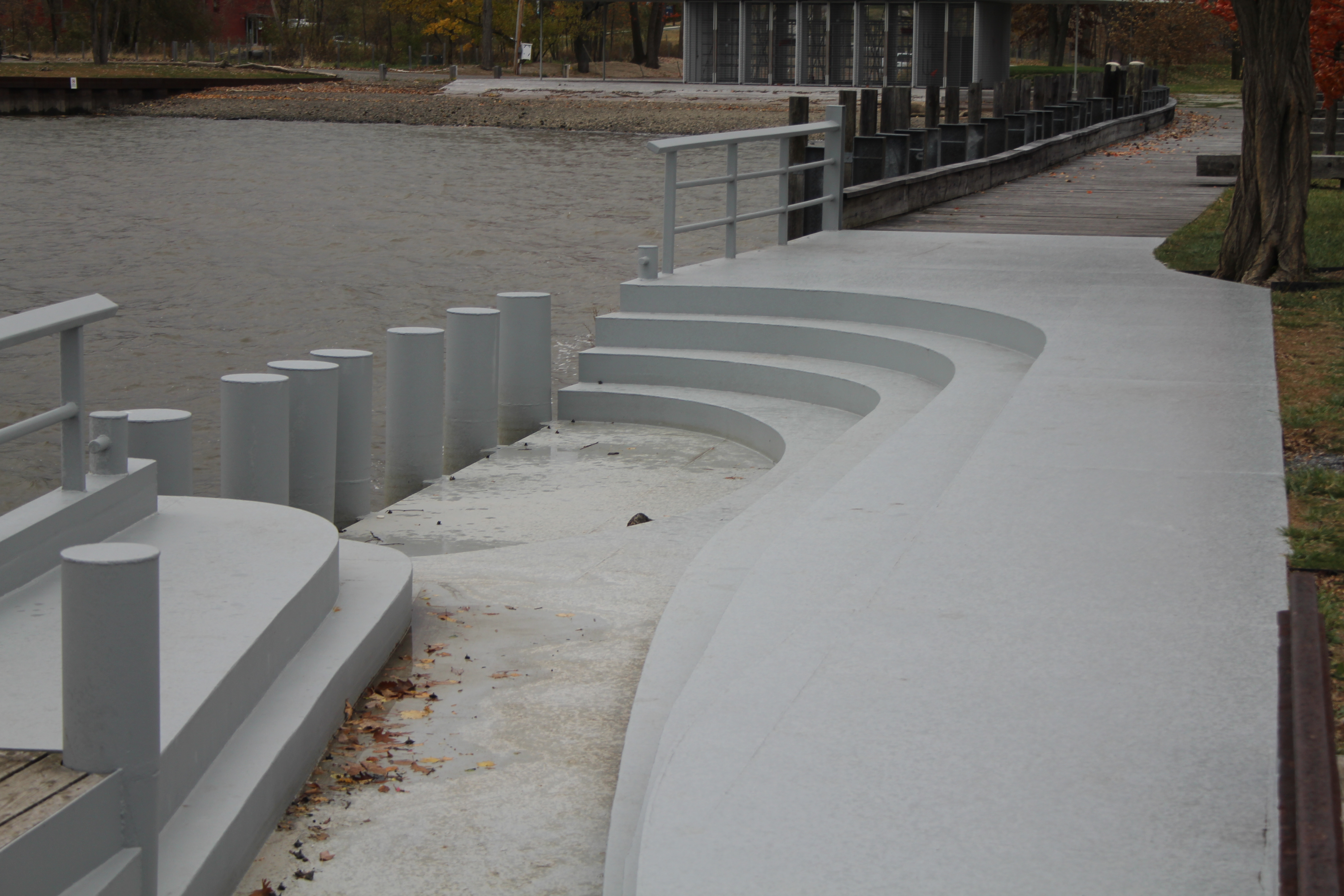
Beacon Point, looking eastward, showing other end of the channel.

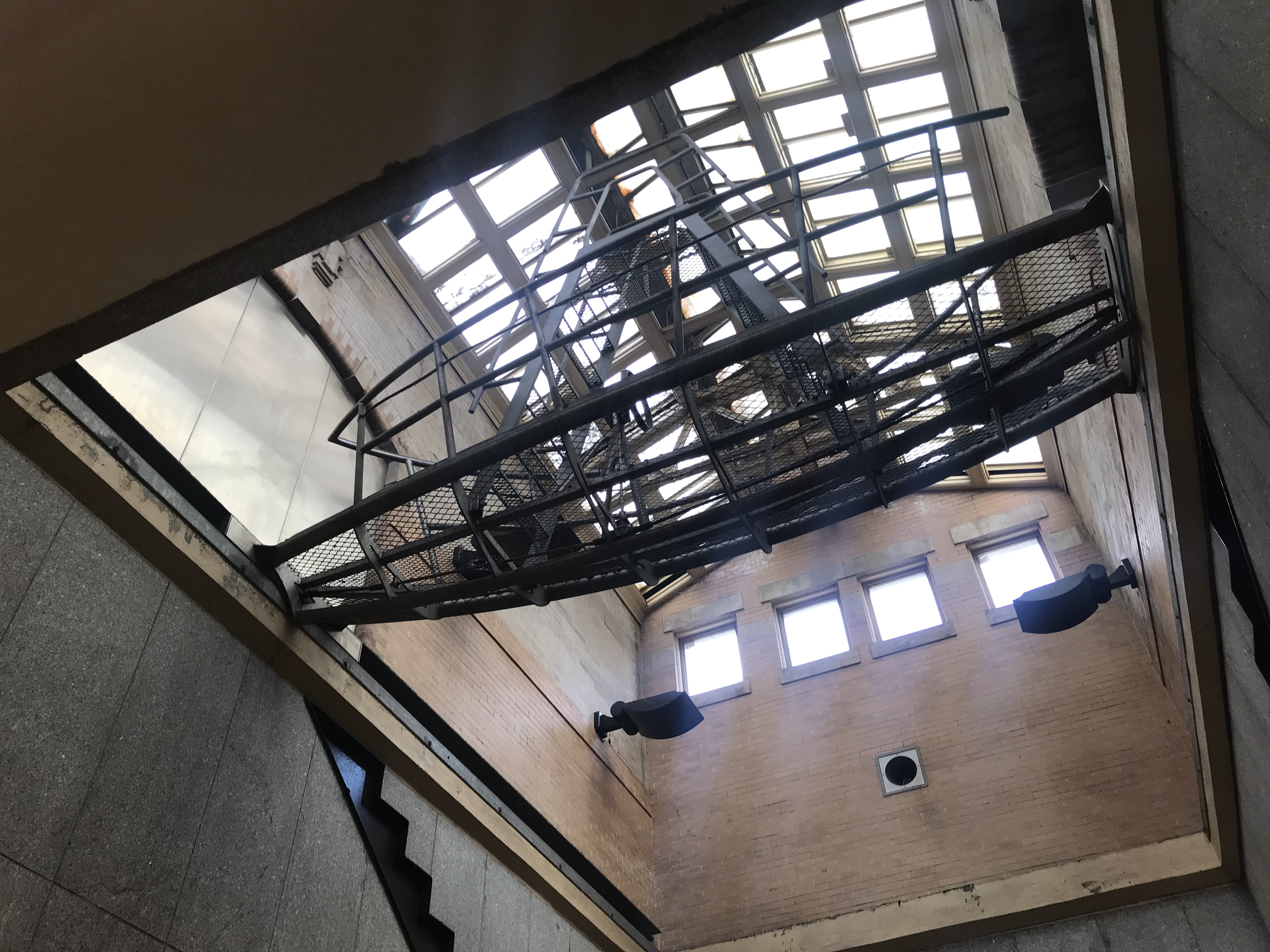
Line sculpture in the former control house of the Atlantic Avenue station.
