= Charles Ruas =

American writer, literarary and art critic

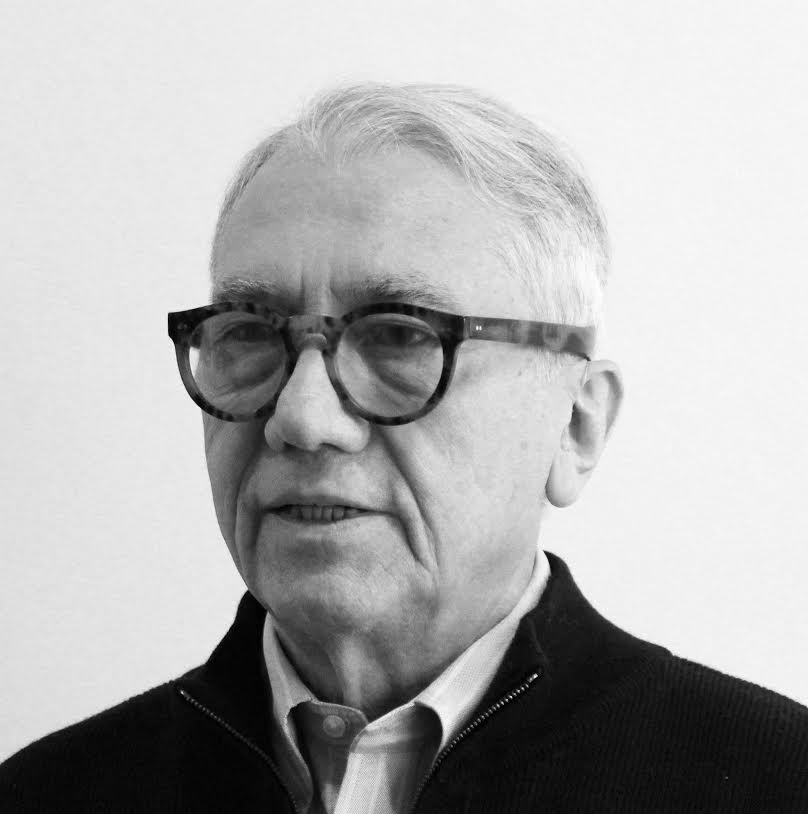
- Born: November 14, 1938 (age 87); Tianjin, China
- Education: Princeton University
- Occupations: Teacher, author, translator, critic, interviewer
- Children: Alexander Ruas
- Awards: Danforth Fellowship, Fulbright, NYSCA, NEA, Chevalier (Knight) of the Order of Arts and Letters

Charles Ruas (born November 14, 1938) is an American teacher, writer, translator, literary and art critic, and interviewer for print and broadcast. He is well known for his work with artists, musicians, and writers of the 1970s, when he was Director of Arts Programming at WBAI Radio, New York. He was a literary and art critic for the Soho Weekly News, ArtNews, and Art in America, among other publications. He is the author of the interview collection Conversations with American Writers (1985) and the editor and translator of numerous literary works. A specialist in French, English, and Comparative Literature, he has taught at Columbia University, New York University, University of Grenoble, France, and Nankai University in China. He lives and works in New York City.

== Background ==
Ruas was born in Tianjin, China in 1938. His father, a French civil engineer, died in 1940 as a result of his work restoring potable water supply during the Great Flood of Tianjin. In 1946, at the end of World War II, Ruas and his brothers, Franklin and Alex, were repatriated with their mother to Paris, where she was recruited to join the United Nations in New York. The family moved to the UN community in Queens, New York, in 1950. Ruas attended Jamaica High School, followed by Princeton University, where he received his BA in 1960, his MA in 1963, and his PhD in 1970. He was a Fulbright Scholar at the Sorbonne from 1963 to 64.

== New York ==
Ruas returned to New York in 1965 to teach French at New York University. After his first year of teaching, he took a summer trip to North Africa and Europe, where he met his future wife, Agneta Danielsson, who was also traveling from her native Sweden. They were married in New York in June, 1967, and the following year celebrated the birth of their son Alexander at New York Hospital in March, 1968.

During this time, Ruas began to write literary criticism for The New Leader, The Village Voice and Anaïs Nin's Under the Sign of Pisces.

== Broadcast ==
=== WBAI ===
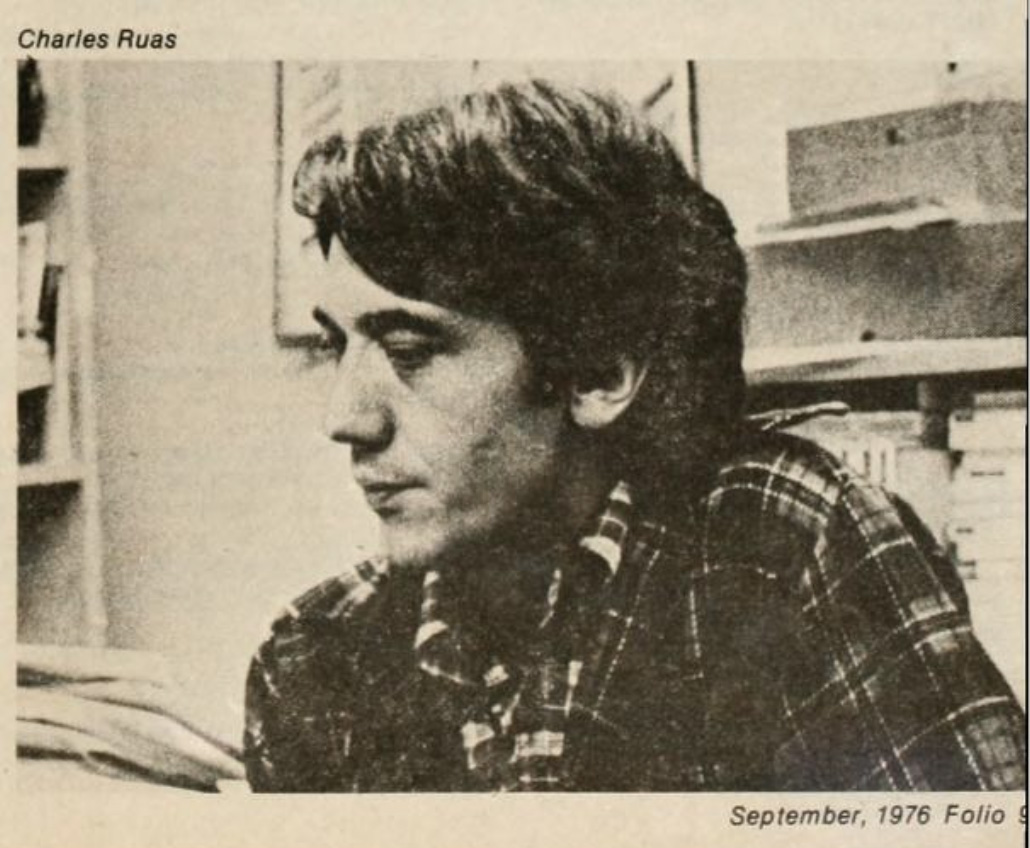
Charles Ruas, Director of Arts Programming, WBAI Folio, September 1976. Photograph by Joan Schwartz, 1975.

In 1974, Ruas proposed to WBAI Radio, New York, a program on the works of Marguerite Young, which turned into The Reading Experiment, a year-long series of readings from her epic novel Miss MacIntosh, My Darling. The readers came from a wide variety of artistic and literary backgrounds—including Anaïs Nin, Marian Seldes, Osceola Macarthy Adams, Wyatt Cooper, Ruth Ford, and Owen Dodson, among others. The programs were scored by artist Rob Wynne with a collage of instrumental music, opera and concrete sound effects.

In the course of this series, Ruas became Director of Arts and Literature programming at WBAI, New York's main platform for the Civil Rights Movements, the anti-Vietnam-war protests and the 1960s counterculture. Its programming was distributed nationally via Pacifica Radio Network. Under Ruas, WBAI also became known for its programming of New York art, poetry, literature, performance and experimental theater, for each of which he initiated weekly coverage. To Courtney Callender's weekly Getting Around show covering the culture scene, Ruas added Moira Hodgson's features on dance and visual arts coverage by a combination of critics and artists, including John Perreault, Cindy Nemser, Liza Baer, Joe Giordano, Judith Vivell, Kenneth Koch and Les Levine. Under Ruas, poetry was covered by Susan Howe and CCNY professor Paul Oppenheimer, who produced programming on alternating weeks.

After the Marguerite Young Reading Experiment series, Ruas presented Helen Adam's play, San Francisco Burning, and Patti Smith performing at Ira Weitzman's Free Music Store in June 1975. Then in 1976, Ruas brought poet John Giorno to the Reading Experiment for his iconic Dial-A-Poem project as an eight-part series. This was followed by Allen Ginsberg's ten-part poetry seminar, recorded at the Jack Kerouac School of Disembodied Poetics at Naropa Institute in Boulder, Colorado. Together with Susan Howe, Anne Waldman, and Maureen Owens, he initiated annual coverage of St. Mark's Church's New Year's Eve poetry marathon. On the day that the Vietnam War ended, Ruas invited Muriel Rukeyser to read her poem on peace.

When Ruas learned that William Burroughs was relocating to New York from Tangiers, he immediately invited him to do a series of readings of his extant works for another series that Ruas initiated, on Major Writers. Other authors in the series included Jerzy Kosinski, Donald Barthelme (in collaboration with music director Judith Sherman) and William Goyen.

Other programming on contemporary fiction featured Maxine Hong Kingston, Ed Sanders, E.L. Doctorow, John Gardner, Nadine Gordimer, and Richard Adams, to name a few.

In non-fiction, Ruas interviewed major figures including biographer Nigel Nicolson, architectural theorist R. Buckminster Fuller, explorer Thor Heyerdahl, social reformer Jonathan Kozol, novelist and historian Alex Haley, memoirist Wyatt Cooper, memoirist and widow of Pablo Neruda, Matilde Urrutia, and poet and memoirist Maya Angelou, among others.

In theater, Ruas presented diverse experimental playwrights including Julian Beck and Judith Malina of the Living Theatre, “Bunny” V.R. Lang, Joseph Chaikin, Jean-Claude van Itallie, Richard Schechner, and the team of Andrei Serban and Elizabeth Swados. He presented Mabou Mines company performing Samuel Beckett. When Tennessee Williams was under attack by critics during the last years of his life, Ruas defended him by covering his Memoirs, his novel Moise and the World of Reason and broadcasting a production of Two-Character Play and In the Bar of a Tokyo Hotel.

In 1976, Ruas created the Audio Experimental Theater, a platform for avant-garde performances at WBAI. The series presented works adapted for radio by Meredith Monk, Yvonne Rainer, Richard Foreman, Ed Bowes, Vito Acconci, Ed Friedman, Charles Ludlam, and Robert Wilson and Philip Glass, among others.

Ruas left WBAI in 1977, during the crisis in which the station's building, the old Swedish Church, was sold. He and Marnie Mueller, the former WBAI Program Director, developed the idea to cover “Arts in New York” on public television, and proposed programming in each of the arts to WNYC-TV and WNET-TV. At the time, public television primarily covered community affairs, current events, news, and entertainment. While “Arts in New York” was being considered, in 1978, Ruas and Mueller received an NEA grant to produce a program on a contemporary artist. For WNET-TV New York, Channel 31, they produced “In Daylight and Cool White,” a documentary on Minimalist artist Dan Flavin, who worked with light sculpture. At the last minute, due to a disagreement with the artist, the program was canceled, and instead donated to the Museum of Modern Art's Film Department archives as a period document.

=== WPS1 and Clocktower Radio ===
In 2004, Ruas resumed broadcasting under the direction of Linda Yablonsky with the series Conversations with Writers for WPS1, Art on Air, in Long Island City. When the station moved from Queens to the historic Clocktower building in downtown Manhattan in 2009, it was renamed Art International Radio. Ruas continued the series there under the direction of David Weinstein until 2013. During this time, Ruas, Weinstein, and AIR associate Tennae Maki restored Ruas’ original WBAI programs and listed them at Clocktower under the name Historic Audio from the Archives of Charles Ruas. Following this initiative, Weinstein and Ruas continued collaborating on the Downtown History Project, making archival recordings of major figures from the downtown scene of the 1960s, including Joan Jonas, Joanne Akalaitis, Anne Waldman, Ed Bowes, Fanny Howe, Susan Howe, R.H. Quaytman, Yvonne Rainer and John Giorno, until interrupted by the covid pandemic.

These audio files are archived at PennSound Center for Programs in Contemporary Writing at the University of Pennsylvania.

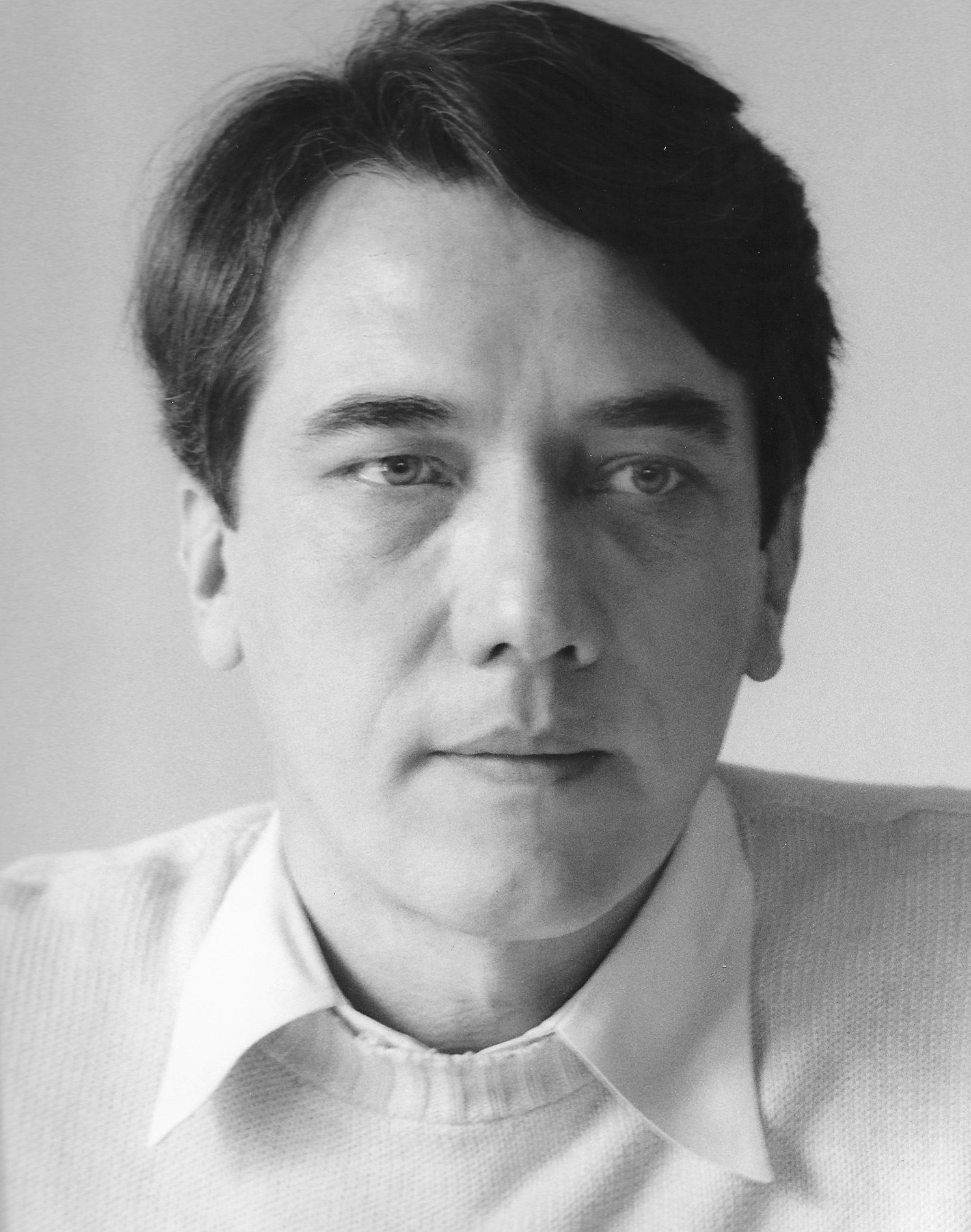
Charles Ruas photographed by Peter Hujar, 1984.

== Literary and arts journalism ==
Ruas began writing about literature and the arts for diverse publications in the 1960s. From 1979 until 1982, he was a contributor to the SoHo Weekly News. In the 1980s and 1990s, he was a regular contributor to ARTnews and Art in America.

In 1983, Ruas was asked to translate Michel Foucault's first book, Death and the Labyrinth: Raymond Roussel, about one of the fathers of experimental writing. When in Paris, Ruas was introduced to Foucault by Edmund White, who was a close friend. An interview was conducted at Foucault's home, in French, just one year before Foucault was to die of AIDS, and it was published in the article “Archéologie d’une passion” in Magazine littéraire. It was included as a postscript in all editions of the translated volume, alongside an Introduction by John Ashbery, who had originally discovered Roussel when he was studying in Paris. For his work on Foucault and contribution as a translator and critic, Charles Ruas was first nominated for the Chevalier (Knight) of the Order of Arts and Letters.

In 1985, Knopf published Conversations with American Writers, collecting Ruas's most notable interviews with literary figures of the 1960s, 70s and 80s, including Norman Mailer, Joseph Heller, Eudora Welty, Susan Sontag, and Toni Morrison, among others. The book has been translated into numerous languages.

== China ==
In 1992, when China reopened to the outside world post-Cultural Revolution, Ruas returned as a Fulbright Professor of American Literature and Civilization to Nankai University in Tianjin, his birthplace. While serving as a professor for two years, he connected with the family of his mother's friend, Grace Divine Liu, the American wife of his father's Chinese colleague. As a widow, she had been assigned to teach English at Nankai University in the same department where Ruas was teaching. Her life story resulted in the book Grace in China, for which Ruas wrote the Introduction. This material, as well as Ruas’ research into his own family history in China from before the Boxer Rebellion to 1946, is now deposited in the Tianjin Museum of Modern History. Ruas's Family Papers and Tianjin History Collection is housed at Princeton University Library.

Conversations with American Writers was translated into Mandarin in 1995. Then in 2019, for its centennial celebration, Nankai University awarded Ruas the College of Foreign Languages Distinguished Professor Medal.

== Editing and work in translation ==
Upon his return to New York from China, Ruas was asked to edit the unfinished manuscript of Marguerite Young's monumental biography of labor leader Eugene Victor Debs, the first Socialist candidate for President of the United States, who ran against Woodrow Wilson from prison during WWI. Harp Song for a Radical: The Life and Times of Eugene Victor Debs was published by Knopf in 1999.

Ruas translated Pierre Assouline's biography of D. H. Kahnweiler, the gallerist who sponsored the rise of Modernism in France, in 1990. This was followed by Assouline's Life of Hergé, on the illustrator and creator of the perennially popular comic book series The Adventures of Tintin. Ruas then worked on two contemporary Polish histories by Agata Tuszynska. The first was Vera Gran the Accused, on the popular early twentieth century Jewish Warsaw singer who was falsely accused of collaboration and treason and forced into exile in France. The second was Tuszinska's autobiographical Family History in Fear, about discovering her Jewish identity and tracing antisemitic persecution and survival during World War II, and under Communism.

For his work in furthering literature and the arts as a scholar and critic and for his translations from the French, in 2012, Ruas was awarded Chevalier de l'Order des Arts et des Lettres (Knight of the Order of Arts and Lettres) by the government of France. A ceremony was held at the French Consulate in New York in 2015.

For the 2026 centenary of Michel Foucault's birth, Ruas's 1983 interview with Foucault was published on Gallica, the website of the Bibliothèque nationale de france.

== Books ==
- The Intellectual Development of the Duc de Saint Simon - Charles Ruas. Princeton University, 1970.
- Conversations with American Writers – Charles Ruas. Knopf, 1985, ISBN 978-0-394-52787-1
- Conversations with American Writers – Charles Ruas. McGraw Hill, 1986, ISBN 0-07-054206-6
- Conversations with American Writers – Charles Ruas. Quartet Books, Ltd, London, 1986, ISBN 0-7043-2554-3
- Conversations with American Writers – Charles Ruas. Macmillan India, Ltd., New Delhi, 1986, ISBN 0-33390-919-4
- Conversaciones con escritores norteamericanos – Charles Ruas (Spanish translation by Carlos Gardini). Editorial Sudamericana, Buenos Aires, 1986, ISBN 950-07-0378-5
- Conversations with American Writers – Charles Ruas. (Mandarin translation.) China Translation and Publishing Corporation, Beijing, 1995, ISBN 7-5001-0396-4
- Death and the Labyrinth: The World of Raymond Roussel – Michel Foucault. John Ashbery (Introduction), Charles Ruas (Translator and Postscript Interview with Michel Foucault). Doubleday, 1986, ISBN 978-0-385-27854-6 / University of California Press, 1987, ISBN 0-5200-5990-5 / Athlone, 1987, ISBN 0-485-12059-3 / Athone Contemporary Thinkers Series, 2004, ISBN 0-8264-6435-1 / Continuum, 2007, ISBN 978-0-8264-9362-0 / Bloomsbury, 2006, ISBN 9781441175366
- An Artful Life: The Biography of D.H. Kahnweiler – Pierre Assouline. Charles Ruas (Translator). Grove/Atlantic, 1990, ISBN 978-0-8021-1227-9
- Grace: An American Woman in China, 1934–1974 – Eleanor McCallie Cooper, William Liu. Charles Ruas (Introduction). Soho Press, 2003, ISBN 978-1-56947-350-4
- Harp Song for a Radical: The Life and Times of Eugene Victor Debs – Marguerite Young. Charles Ruas Editor. Knopf, 2009, ISBN 978-0-19-539759-8
- Hergé: The Man Who Created Tintin — Pierre Assouline. Charles Ruas (Translator) Oxford University Press, 2009, ISBN 0-670-79099-0
- Vera Gran: The Accused – Agata Tuszynska. Charles Ruas (Translator). Knopf, 2013, ISBN 978-0-307-26912-6
- Portrait of a Family in Fear – Agata Tuszynska. Charles Ruas (Translator). Knopf, 2016, ISBN 978-0375413704

== Anthologies ==
- The Art of Literary Publishing: Editors and Their Craft, edited by Bill Henderson. Pushcart Press, 1980, ISBN 0-916366-05-7.
  - "New Directions: An Interview with James Laughlin" with Susan Howe
  - "The Struggle Against Censorship: with Maurice Girodias, William Burroughs, Allen Ginsberg, Carl Solomon, and James Grauerholtz"
- Writers at Work, Sixth Series, edited by George Plimpton. The Viking Press, 1984, ISBN 978-0-679-42757-5.
  - "Carlos Fuentes: An Interview," with Alfred MacAdam.
- Tennessee Williams Interviews, edited by Albert J. Devlin. University Press of Mississippi, 1986. ISBN 0-87805-263-1.
- "Tony Morrison, Interview," The Fiction Writer's Market, 1987. Writer's Digest Books, 1987. ISBN 0-89879-267-3.
- Marguerite Young Festschrift, University of Hawaii Press, 1993.
  - "The Epic Imagination."
- Marguerite Young, Our Darling: Tributes and Essays, edited by Miriam Fuchs, Dalkey Archive Press, 1994. ISBN 978-1564780553
- Conversations with Susan Sontag, edited by Leland Poague. University Press of Mississippi, 1995. ISBN 0-87805-834-6.
  - "Susan Sontag: Me, Etcetera"
- Conversations with Eudora Welty, Vol II, edited by Peggy Whitman Prenshaw. University Press of Mississippi, 1996. ISBN 0-87805-864-8.
- Foucault Live: Collected Interviews, edited by Sylvère Lotringer. Semiotext(e), Columbia University Press, 1996. ISBN 9781570270185.
- Recollections of Anaïs Nin: By Her Contemporaries, edited by Benjamin Franklin V. Ohio University Press, 1996. ISBN 0821411659.
- Donald Barthelme, Not Knowing: The Essays and Interviews, edited by Kim Herzinger. Villard, 1999. ISBN 0679409831.
- Burroughs Live: Collected Interviews, edited by Sylvère Lotringer. Semiotext(e), Columbia University Press, 2001. ISBN 9781584350101.
- Conversations with Robert Stone, edited by William Heath. University Press of Mississippi, 2016. ISBN 978-1-4968-0891-2.

== Select articles and reviews ==
=== Literary reviews ===
- "The Volatile Voyeur: Cecil Beaton: A Biography," Review, The New York Native, September 20, 1986.
- "Marguerite Young, Interview." The Paris Review #71, New York, 1977.
- "Andy Warhol," Interview, Book Forum, June 1980.
- "Han Suyin, My House Has Two Rooms," Review, Soho News, July 23, 1980.
- John Berger: Pig Earth, Review, Soho News, August 20, 2980.
- "Truman Capote," Interview, Soho News, September 3, 1980.
- "E.L. Doctorow," Interview, Soho News, September 3, 1980.
- "Paul Theroux," Interview, Soho News, September 21, 1980.
- "Susan Sontag," Interview, Soho News, October 12, 1890.
- "Mary Lee Settle," Interview, Soho News, October 1980.
- "Eudora Welty," Interview, Soho News, October 1980.
- "Anne Arensberg," Interview, Soho News, October 22, 1980.
- "Vincent Virgas," Interview, Soho News, December 23, 1980.
- "Toni Morrison," Interview, Soho News, March 11, 1981.
- "Elizabeth Bowen, The Collected Stories," Review, Soho News, April 15, 1981.
- "Gore Vidal," Interview, Soho News, 1981.
- "Elizabeth Spencer, Collected Stories," Review, Soho News, 1981.
- "Robert Stone, A Flag for Sunrise," New York Times Book Review, October 18, 1981.
- "Mario Vargas Ilosa, Aunt Julia and the Scriptwriter," New York Times Book Review, September 1, 1982.
- "Susan Sontag: Past Present and Future," New York Times Book Review, October 24, 1982.

=== Arts journalism ===
- "Kiki Smith at Pace Wildenstein," Art News, 1997.
- "Giacometti Retrospective at MoMA," Art News, December 2001.
- "Selected Works: Jack Smith's Flaming Creatures and works by Jackie Windsor, John Coplans, Lynn Yamamoto at PS 1," Art News, October 2001.
- "Ellen Zimmerman at Gagosian," Art News, December 2001.
- "Vermeer and the Delft School at Metropolitan Museum of Art," Art News, December 2001.
- "John Coplans at Andrea Rosen Gallery," Art News, December 2001.
- "John Riddy on John Ruskin's Praeterita at Lawrence Markey, Art News, December 2001.
- "Jewish Artists on the Edge at Yeshiva University," Art News, April 2002.
- "Pierre Klossoski's Large-Scale Drawings at Zabriskie Gallery," Art in America, January 2003.
- "Marina Karella Retrospective: The Benaki Museum Annex for Contemporary Art, Athens, Greece," Art in America, April 2005.
- "Claude and François Lalanne: Sculpture at Paul Kasmin Gallery," Art News, November 2006.
- "Victorian Best Sellers: The Morgan Library," Art News, January 2007.
- "Edward Hopper's Etchings: 1915–1923 at Museum of Modern Art," Art News, May 2008.

=== Asian arts and culture ===
- "China's Other Cultural Revolution: History and Chinese Art, 1850–1980," Art in America, September 1, 1998.
- "20th Century Chinese Art: Inside Out: New Chinese Art at Asia Society and PS 1 Contemporary Art Center," Art in America, September 1998.
- "Frank Lloyd Wright and the Art of Japan at Japan Society," Art News, November 2001.
- "Contemporary Chinese Artists, Goedhuis Gallery," Art News, April 2002
- "The Silk Road: Import/Export: A Passage to China at Asia Society," Art in America, March 2002.
- "Designed for Pleasure: The World of Edo, Japan, in Prints and Paintings at the Asia Society," Art News, June 2007.
- "Rough and Refined: Contemporary Japanese Avant-Garde at Leo Castelli Gallery," Art News, June 2007.
- "Art and China's Revolution at Asia Society," Art News, October 2008.

=== Arts and literature journalism in France ===
- "Susan Sontag," l'Express (Paris), 1984.
- "Norman Mailer," Interview, Contre Ciel: Le magazine de lecture (Paris), December 1984.
- "Tennessee Williams, la Jungle," Interview, l'Express (Paris), May 1984.
- "Paul Theroux," Interview, l'Express (Paris), July 1984.
- "Truman Capote,'Comme j'étais gentil!,'" Interview, l'Express (Paris), August 1984.
- "Michel Foucault: Archéologie d'une passion," Magazine littéraire (Paris), No. 221, July–August 1985. Reprinted in Dits et Ecrits, No. 343.
- "Rodin in China, Fine Arts Palace, Beijing," Art in America, December 1993.
- "Delpire & Cie., Maison Européenne de la Photographie, Paris," Art in America, 2010.
- "Un enregistrement inédit de Michel Foucault dans Gallica" Gallica, 2026.

== Filmography ==
- Joan Jonas: I Want to Live in the Country (And Other Romances) (1976), written and performed by Joan Jonas, intercutting scenes from the Nova Scotia countryside with images of a Soho loft studio set-up, and featuring visuals, readings and music. (consultant)
- Better, Stronger (1978), written and directed by Ed Bowes. With Karen Achenbach and Charles Ruas. Camera by Tom Bowes. Video Feature Film, Walsung Productions.
- How to Fly (1980), written and directed by Ed Bowes. With Tom Bowes and Karen Achenbach. Video Feature Film, Walsung Productions. (consultant)
- Spitting Glass (1989), written and directed by Ed Bowes. With Rosie Hall and cameo by Sophie Marsh. Musical score by Brooks Williams. Costumes by Nicole Miller. Produced by Amy Taubin. Video Feature Film, Walsung Productions. (consultant)
