= Howard Mitcham =

American artist (1917–1996)

James Howard Mitcham (1917 in Winona, Mississippi – August 22, 1996 in Hyannis, Massachusetts) was an American artist, poet, and cook best known for his books on Louisiana's Creole and Cajun cuisines and that of New England, with an emphasis on seafood.

== Life and career ==
Deaf from spinal meningitis as a teenager, Mitcham attended Louisiana State University and moved to Greenwich Village where he owned an art gallery. He acquired a reputation as a bohemian, raconteur, and "Renaissance man", spending much of his life in Provincetown, Massachusetts and New Orleans. He contributed a column to the Provincetown Advocate, since absorbed by the Banner.

Many of his books combined personal memoir and recipes with his own woodcuts and drawings. Anthony Bourdain described Mitcham's Provincetown Seafood Cookbook as "a witty, informative ode to local seafood, sprinkled with anecdotes".

He was the model for the "stone-deaf man" in Marguerite Young's Miss MacIntosh, My Darling.

== Books ==
- Fishing on the Gulf Coast, The Hermit Crab Press, New Orleans 1959
- Four Tales from Byzantium, edition of 150 numbered copies printed by Wattle Grove Press, Newnham, Tasmania 1964
- Provincetown Seafood Cookbook, The Hermit Crab Press, Provincetown 1975, ISBN 0-940160-33-1
- Creole Gumbo and All That Jazz: A New Orleans Seafood Cookbook, Addison-Wesley Publishing Co., Reading, MA 1978, ISBN 0-201-04764-0
- Maya o Maya!: Rambunctious fables of Yucatán, edition of 500 numbered copies printed by The Hermit Crab Press, New Orleans 1981
- Tales from Byzantium, edition of 1000 numbered copies printed by The Hermit Crab Press, New Orleans 1984
- Clams, Mussels, Oysters, Scallops, and Snails: A Cookbook and a Memoir, Parnassus Imprints, Orleans, MA 1990, ISBN 0-940160-47-1
- Provincetown Seafood Cookbook: With a New Introduction by Anthony Bourdain, Seven Stories Press, New York City 2018, ISBN 9781609808396

== See also ==
- Shrimp Boil
- "Mississippi's Greatest Chef" by Jesse Yancy
