= Sheila Dabney =

American actress

Sheila Dabney is an American actress, best known for her co-starring role in the 1987 lesbian feminist film She Must Be Seeing Things alongside Lois Weaver and directed by Sheila McLaughlin.

In 1984, Dabney won an Obie Award for her performance as Sarita in Maria Irene Fornés' play Sarita.

== Theater ==
- Performer, The Bacchae (1980) at Circle in the Square Theatre
- Performer, The Three Travels of Aladdin With the Magic Lamp (1982) at La MaMa Experimental Theatre Club
- Performer, Hot Lunch Apostles (1983) at La MaMa Experimental Theatre Club
- Performer, Conjur Woman (1983) at La MaMa Experimental Theatre Club
- Performer, Jerusalem (1983), a work-in-progress, at La MaMa Experimental Theatre Club
- Performer, Sarita (1984), produced by INTAR Theatre
- Performer, Hot Lunch Apostles (1984) at La MaMa Experimental Theatre Club
- Performer, Pedro Paramo (1984) at La MaMa Experimental Theatre Club
- Performer, Harm's Way (1985) at La MaMa Experimental Theatre Club
- Performer, Big Mouth (1985) at La MaMa Experimental Theatre Club
- Performer, Cotton Club Gala (1985) at La MaMa Experimental Theatre Club
- Performer, Fragments of a Greek Trilogy (1987) at La MaMa Experimental Theatre Club
- Performer and musical composition and direction, Mythos Oedipus and Dionysus Filius Dei (1989) at La MaMa Experimental Theatre Club
- Performer and additional music and arrangements, Tancredi and Erminia (1993) at La MaMa Experimental Theatre Club
- Performer, Conjur Woman (2008) at La MaMa Experimental Theatre Club
- Musical director and performer, Red Noir (2009) at the Living Theatre

== Filmography ==
- She Must Be Seeing Things (1987) as Agatha
- Rage of Angels (1983 TV film based on the novel by Sidney Sheldon) as Sharon
- Alice at the Palace (1982 TV film)
- The Underground Man (1974 TV film) as Rent-A-Car Girl
