= WBAI =

Pacifica Radio station in New York City

- New York, New York; United States
- Broadcast area: New York metropolitan area
- Frequency: 99.5 MHz
- Branding: WBAI

Programming
- Languages: English; Spanish
- Format: Free-form; Progressive
- Affiliations: Pacifica Radio

Ownership
- Owner: Pacifica Foundation

History
- First air date: January 8, 1960
- Call sign meaning: Broadcast Associates, Incorporated (former owner)

Technical information
- Licensing authority: FCC
- Facility ID: 51249
- Class: B
- ERP: 10,000 watts
- HAAT: 282.3 meters (926 ft)
- Transmitter coordinates: 40°45′22.4″N 73°59′10.5″W

Links
- Public license information: Public file; LMS
- Webcast: Listen live
- Website: wbai.org

WBAI (99.5 FM) is a non-commercial, listener-supported radio station licensed to serve New York, New York. Its programming is a mixture of political news, talk and opinion from a left-leaning, liberal or progressive viewpoint, and eclectic music. The station is owned by the Pacifica Foundation with studios located in Brooklyn and transmitter located at 4 Times Square.

== History ==
=== Origins ===
The station began as WABF, which first went on the air in 1941 as W75NY, of Metropolitan Television, Inc. (W75NY indicating an eastern station at 47.5 MHz in New York), and moved to the 99.5 frequency in 1947. In 1955, after two years off the air, it was reborn as WBAI (after then-owners Broadcast Associates, Inc.).

=== 1960s ===
WBAI was purchased by philanthropist Louis Schweitzer, who donated it to the Pacifica Foundation in 1960. The station, which had been a commercial enterprise, became non-commercial and listener-supported under Pacifica ownership.

The history of WBAI during this period is iconoclastic and contentious. Referred to in a New York Times Magazine piece as "an anarchist's circus," one station manager was jailed in protest. The staff, in protest at sweeping proposed changes of another station manager, seized the studio facilities, then located in a deconsecrated church, as well as the transmitter, located at the Empire State Building. During the 1960s, the station hosted numerous anti-establishment causes, including anti-Vietnam war activists, feminists (and live coverage of purported bra-burning demonstrations), kids lib, early Firesign Theater comedy, and complete-album music overnight. It refused to stop playing Janis Ian's song about interracial relationships "Society's Child". Extensive daily coverage of the Vietnam war included the ongoing body count and innumerable anti-war protests.

WBAI played a major role in the evolution and development of the counterculture of the 1960s and early 1970s. Arlo Guthrie's "Alice's Restaurant" was first broadcast on Radio Unnameable, Bob Fass' freeform radio program on WBAI, a program which itself in many ways created, explored, and defined the possibilities of the form. The station covered the 1968 seizure of the Columbia University campus live and uninterrupted. With its signal reaching nearly 70 miles beyond New York City, its reach and influence, both direct and indirect, were significant. Among the station's weekly commentators in the 1960s were author Ayn Rand, British politician/playwright Sir Stephen King-Hall, and author Dennis Wholey. The 1964 Political conventions were "covered" satirically on WBAI by Severn Darden, Elaine May, Burns and Schreiber, David Amram, Julie Harris, Taylor Mead, and members of The Second City improvisational group. The station, under Music Directors John Corigliano, Ann McMillan and, later Eric Salzman, aired an annual 23-hour nonstop presentation of Richard Wagner's Ring Cycle, as recorded at the Bayreuth Festival the year before, and produced live studio performances of emerging artists in its studios. Interviews with prominent figures in literature and the arts, as well as original dramatic productions and radio adaptations were also regular program offerings.

=== 1970s ===
In 1970, Kathy Dobkin, Milton Hoffman, and Francie Camper produced an unprecedented, critically acclaimed 4 1/2 day round-the-clock reading of Tolstoy's War And Peace. The epic novel was read cover to cover by more than 200 people—including a large number of international celebrities from various fields. Newsweek called this broadcast "one of the more mind-blowing 'firsts' in the history of the media". The complete reading (over 200 audio tapes) was the first Pacifica program to be selected for inclusion in the permanent collection of the Museum of Broadcasting in NYC.

A Woman's Department was also founded at WBAI in the 1970s. Some of the first shows were hosted by Nanette Raionee, although as the department expanded so to did the hosts. As these programs were produced by the woman's department, they focused mainly on women's issues. There was also a strong focus on both lesbian and queer issues. Some of the programs produced were reoccurring radio shows, like More Than Half The World or The Lesbian Show. These shows would play music by women, host debates, and hold interviews with notable women of the time.

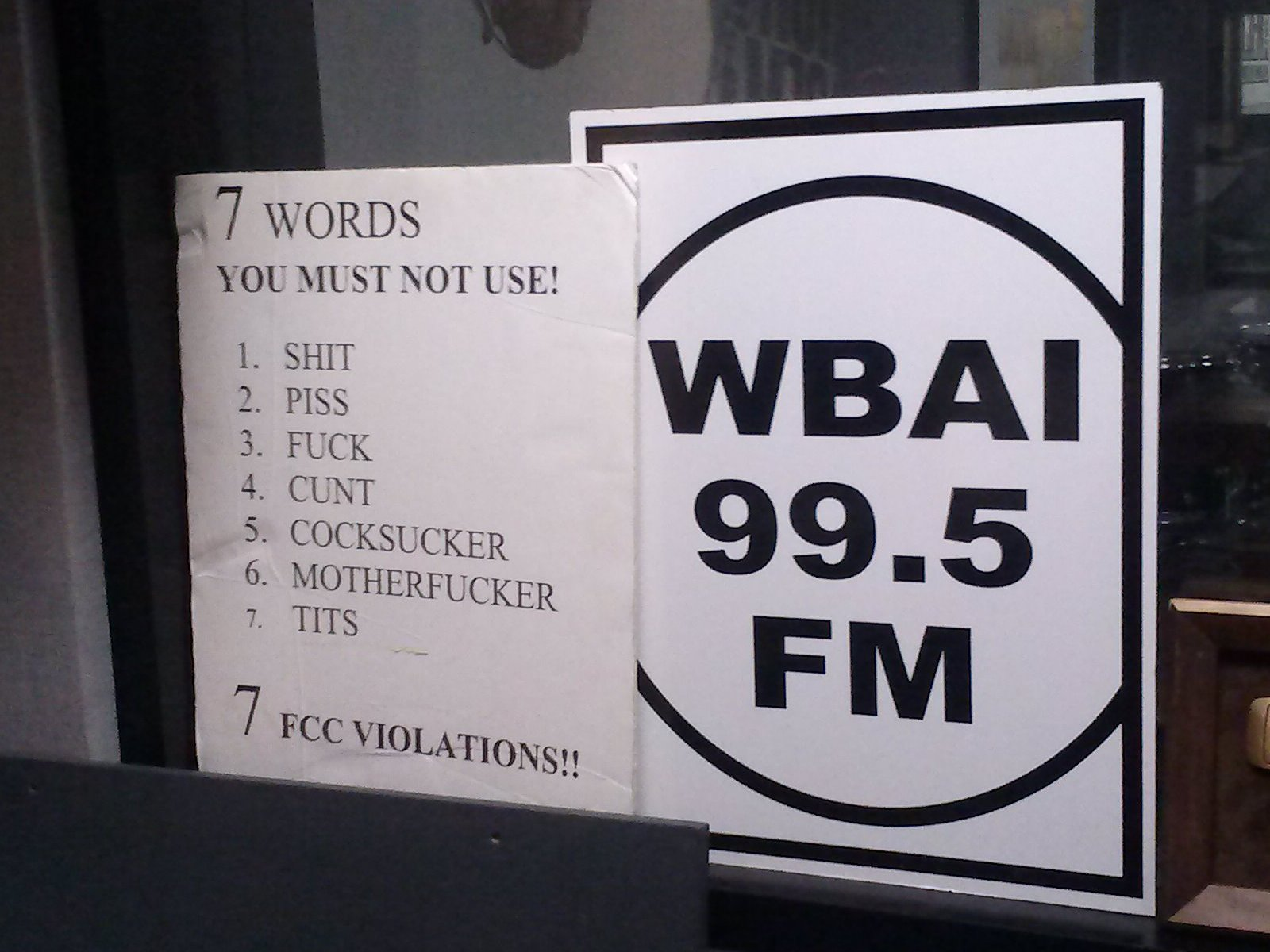
A poster in a WBAI broadcast booth warns radio broadcasters against using the seven dirty words.

In 1973, the station broadcast comedian George Carlin's iconic Seven Words You Can Never Say on Television monologue uncensored. WBAI's broadcast of Seven Words became a landmark moment in the history of free speech. In a 1978 milestone in the station's contentious and unruly history, WBAI lost a 5-to-4 U.S. Supreme Court decision (FCC v. Pacifica Foundation) that to this day has defined the power of the government over broadcast material it calls indecent. Mickey Waldman and Joe Cuomo covered much of the legal proceedings during this time.

In 1974, WBAI program director Marnie Mueller asked Charles Ruas to become director of arts programming. Thus the station, already at the forefront of the Civil Rights Movement, the counterculture and anti-war protest, under Ruas also became a platform for New York's avant-garde in theater, music, performance, art, and poetry. When the downtown avant-garde operas A Letter for Queen Victoria and Einstein on the Beach by Philip Glass and Robert Wilson opened at the Metropolitan Opera, the station was right there to tape excerpts in rehearsals for broadcast.

Ruas initiated The Reading Experiment, a year-long series on Marguerite Young's epic novel Miss MacIntosh, My Darling. These readings were transformed into performances by Rob Wynne, who scored them with a complex collage of sound effects, music, and opera. The participants included Anaïs Nin, Marian Seldes, Alice Playten, H.M. Koutoukas, Leo Lerman, Michael Wager, Novella Nelson, Osceola Macarthy Adams, Owen Dodson, Wyatt Emory Cooper, Michael Higgins, Anne Fremantle, Peggy Cass, Ruth Ford, Earle Hyman and Daisy Aldan.

When William Burroughs returned to the United States from Tangier, Ruas invited him to present a retrospective of all his works. The series consisted of four programs, beginning with Junkie and followed by The Yage Letters, read by Burroughs and Allen Ginsberg, The Last Words of Dutch Schultz, and, finally, Naked Lunch. Bill Kortum oversaw this series as well as retrospectives of the works of Jerzy Kosinski and Donald Barthelme, co-produced with Judith Sherman, the station's music director.

A semester of Allen Ginsberg's poetry seminar held at the Naropa Institute in Colorado was presented by Ruas, and for many years the station covered the annual New Year's Eve celebratory poetry marathon at St. Mark's Church. The day the Vietnam War ended, poet Muriel Rukeyser came to the station to read her poem on peace.

Ruas inaugurated the Audio Experimental Theater, a series presenting the works of avant-garde artists: Meredith Monk, Yvonne Rainer, Ed Bowes, Ed Friedman, Michael Newman with Joan Schwartz and Benjamin Folkman, Vito Acconci, Charles Ludlum, Jacques Levy, Willoughby Sharp, John Cage, Robert Wilson, Philip Glass, Richard Foreman, and Joan Jonas.

In drama, the station defended Tennessee Williams against his critics during the last years of his life by covering his Memoirs and broadcasting a production of Two-Character Play. Other dramatists whose works were featured included Jean-Claude van Itallie, Richard Scheckner, Andrei Serban, and Elizabeth Swados.

Ruas initiated interview programs featuring nonfiction writers discussing their fields of expertise—Buckminster Fuller, Thor Heyerdahl, Ed Sanders, Jonathan Kozol and Nigel Nicholson.

Each of the arts had weekly coverage. Courtney Callender's Getting Around covered the cultural scene. Moira Hodgson was the dance critic. The visual arts critics were John Perreault, Cindy Nemser, Liza Baer, Joe Giordano, Judith Vivell, Kenneth Koch, and Les Levine.

Ruas invited poet Susan Howe and CCNY Literature professor Paul Oppenheimer to produce a weekly poetry program. Howe produced a weekly poetry program presenting the works of John Ashbery, W.S. Merwin, Maureen Owen, Charles Reznikoff, Rebecca Wright, Ron Padgett, Carter Ratcliff, John Hollander, Anne Waldman, Helen Adam, Audre Lorde, Michael Brownstein, Mary Ferrari, and Muriel Rukeyser. She also produced specials featuring William Carlos Williams, V. R. Lang, Jack Spicer, Louise Bogan, Paul Metcalf, Jonathan Williams, Harry Mathews, and James Laughlin.

On alternate weeks, Oppenheimer presented the works of Barbara Holland, Ivan Arguelles, Ann Darr, Richard Howard, Karen Swenson, James Emanuel, Siv Cedering Fox, Nelson Canton, Victoria Sullivan, Samuel Menashe, Carol Hebald, Paul Zweig, Gregor Roy and Mary Jane Menuez. He also produced specials on the aesthetics of 20th century poets and the history of the sonnet with contemporary American examples.

From 1976 to 1979, poet John Giorno hosted The Poetry Experiment and presented, with Charles Ruas, his eight-part series Dial-A-Poem Poets.

When Ira Weitzman became Director of the Saturday night Free Music Store program, he was as interested in performance as dedicated to music. He oversaw Meredith Monk's performance of Quarry, as well as producing Broadway actress Marian Seldes in Portrait of an Unknown Lady: Eleanor Wylie. He produced Performing Poets in Support of WBAI with the country's most notable poets. His best known production was an evening with the performing poets Ed Friedman, Helen Adam and Patti Smith, who performed her first concert.

During those years, WBAI became a cultural force as these programs were disseminated nationally through the Pacifica Network.

In 1977, there was a major internal crisis at WBAI which resulted in the loss of the physical space of the station. WBAI was located in a former church on the Upper East Side of Manhattan. For many years, WBAI had believed it was exempt from New York City real estate taxes as an "educational" institution, but in March 1977 the City Tax Commission denied that status and WBAI eventually sold the church (which it owned) to pay the back taxes. WBAI signed a new lease for the 19th floor (the former Caedmon Records office/studio) plus one office on another floor of an office building at 505 8th Avenue on the West Side of Manhattan.

=== Turmoil and change ===
After the events in 1977, the station began a shift to a more profound international direction. In 1980, Caribbean immigrant and Marxist activist Samori Marksman was hired as WBAI Program Director and with his ascension, there was more of a focus on international issues and the promotion of people of color to the WBAI staff which caused grumbling among long time white and Jewish progressives who felt they were being pushed out of the station. In 1983, Marksman abruptly left for the Caribbean island of Grenada to participate in a new government – a government that was thwarted by the US invasion of Grenada in October 1983.

In 1986, gay activist John Scagliotti became program director. He initiated many program changes; still more long-time programmers left the station. Scagliotti tried to professionalize the programming and smooth out the rougher edges of existing shows. During his tenure, several producers received accolades for their efforts, including Robert Knight, who won a Polk Award for his show "Contragate", and future program director and Station Manager Valerie Van Isler, who won awards for her role in the film, The Panama Deception. Also, award-winning producer and host Amy Goodman began her career under Scagliotti. Samori Marksman returned to WBAI in the early 90s and in 1994, and was hired again as WBAI's Program Director. During his five-year tenure, WBAI achieved significant progress in listenership and fundraising. Marksman founded Democracy Now! in 1996, the award-winning program now helmed by Amy Goodman. Marksman was deeply-connected to the Caribbean and African diaspora. His own program, "Behind The News", focused on international and national issues from a black nationalist and Marxist perspective. Marksman was profoundly loved by a broad cross section of the WBAI audience and staff. His shocking and sudden death from a massive heart attack on March 23, 1999, was a wound to the station that lasted for years. Over 3,000 people attended his funeral at the Cathedral of St. John the Divine in Manhattan.

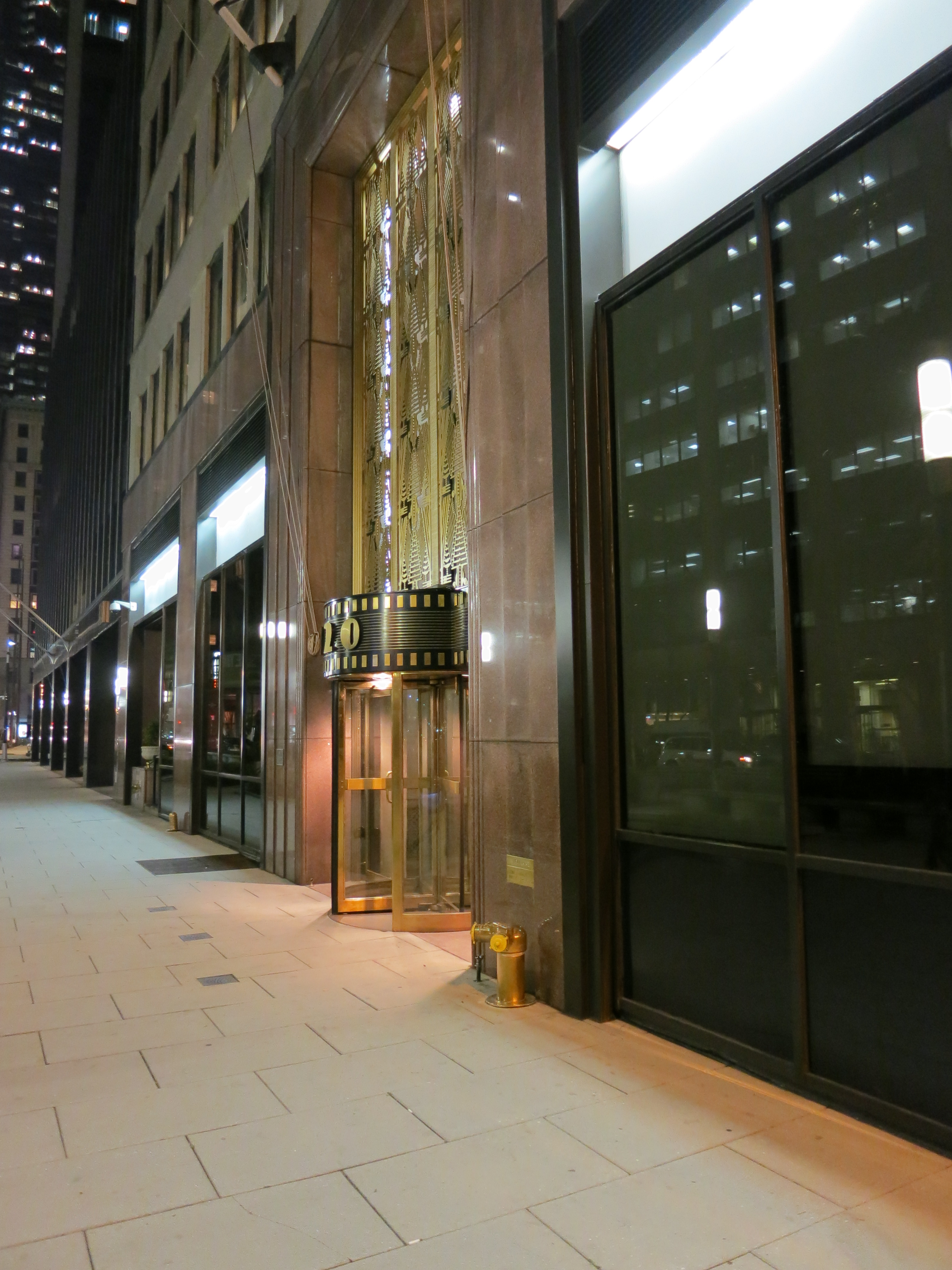
The outside door of 120 Wall Street, where WBAI was formerly headquartered.

Shortly before the death of Samori Marksman and following years of complaints about the outdated and filthy studios at 505 Eighth Avenue in New York, WBAI moved to new studios at 120 Wall Street in the Financial District in Manhattan in June 1998. After the death of Marksman, there was profound uncertainty and an explosion of pent-up feelings and resentments that was suppressed by Marksman and Mario Murillo, the Public Affairs director. Utrice Leid, a popular Caribbean radio host and producer had expected to succeed Marksman but was denied the post by then-general manager Valerie Van Isler. This led to an intense battle between various factions inside and outside the station and with The Pacifica Foundation, the non-profit parent company of WBAI. The culmination of this conflict was the "Christmas Coup" in December 2000 when a faction, led by Leid, padlocked the station and took control of the airwaves, starting an on-air and off-air war that lasted for several years. Some senior WBAI staffers, including general manager Van Isler, were fired immediately. Van Isler, in particular, was blamed for the early death of Marksman. In 1994, Van Isler initially refused to hire Marksman, claiming Marksman had a mediocre credit report, then, later in his tenure, refused to give him a salary increase. The autocratic and unpopular Van Isler also vigorously fought former staffers from obtaining unemployment benefits, including Bill Wells, the former WBAI Chief Engineer, who had a disability.

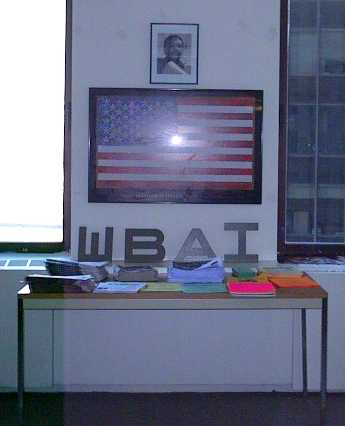
The former WBAI studios on the 10th floor of 120 Wall Street, Manhattan

In late 2012, WBAI suffered extensive damage to its offices following the events of Hurricane Sandy. The Manhattan offices saw flooding reach the second floor, trapping seven staffers inside, and the telephone systems being disabled. The devastation by Sandy occurred in the midst of fundraising efforts, which ultimately prevented WBAI from acquiring the necessary funds to remain operational. As a result of funding and operational difficulties, WBAI announced in 2013 it would be moving out of those studios to temporary studios of WHCR-FM located in Harlem, a station operated by City College of New York (CUNY).

Lynne Rosen and John Littig, co-hosts of the monthly show The Pursuit of Happiness, were found dead on June 3, 2013, after committing suicide in their Park Slope home.

In June 2013, the Corporation for Public Broadcasting suspended payments to WBAI, citing accounting irregularities and a failure by the station to meet its financial obligations. Layoff notices effective July 15 were subsequently issued to the station's staff and management.

On August 9, 2013, Pacifica management announced that due to financial problems, WBAI was laying off about two-thirds of its staff, effective August 12, 2013. The entire news department was laid off. Summer Reese, the interim executive director of the Pacifica Foundation, which owns WBAI, said that after talks with SAG-AFTRA, the union that represents broadcasting talent, "we will be laying off virtually everyone whose voice you recognize on the air," effective Monday. She corrected that and announced the final number was 19 out of the station's 29 employees, about 66%. Andrew Phillips, the former general manager of another of Pacifica's five stations, KPFA in Berkeley, California, was appointed WBAI's interim program director. The New York Times reported that the station owed $2 million in broadcast fees to Democracy Now! alone, while cash on hand was just $23,000.

In March 2014, there were assorted rumors that the station would be sold or leased or moved, in whole or in part (including their equipment and antenna at the Empire State Building), after contentions and firings both at WBAI and at Pacifica headquarters.

On December 17, 2014, the California State Attorney General opened a full and formal investigation into the Pacifica Radio Foundation, owner of WBAI, with respect to its alleged irregularities as to its finances, violations of California law with respect to nonprofit organizations, and violations of its own bylaws. In 2015, WBAI moved to new studios and offices at 388 Atlantic Avenue in the Boerum Hill section of Brooklyn.

On October 4, 2017, the court rejected WBAI's pleadings as ill-founded and granted the Empire State Realty Trust (ESRT) a summary judgment, in the amount of $1.8m plus attorney's fees, for the monies due through the initial filing date of late 2016. ESRT was awarded with an additional $600k for the lease through the date of the court's ruling, with obligations of approximately $50k+ per month through lease expiration in 2020 also remaining in place. A further settlement was announced on April 6, 2018, releasing WBAI from the court judgment and its obligation to continuing leasing the Empire State tower into 2020. They began broadcasting from 4 Times Square on May 31, 2018. A bailout loan from listeners of sister station KPFK eventually covered the remaining fees on the lease.

On Monday, October 7, 2019, the Pacifica Foundation announced they were shutting down WBAI's local operations, leaving only two workers to keep the station's signal on the air. WBAI began airing a national network feed known as "Pacifica Across America" - a curated collection of original content produced by Pacifica stations KPFA in Berkeley, California, KPFK in Los Angeles, KPFT in Houston and WPFW in Washington, D.C., among other sources (the post-shutdown WBAI schedule included commercial progressive talker Thom Hartmann and Native American free-form series Undercurrents, which is mostly syndicated to public radio). John Vernile, interim executive director of the Pacifica Foundation, said the station's fund raising and audience had declined in recent years, to the point where the rest of the Pacifica network was subsidizing WBAI's operations on top of servicing its unsustainable debt load.

Within hours of the shutdown, WBAI's staffers filed a lawsuit in New York state court challenging the shutdown as illegal. A temporary injunction was granted the afternoon of October 8, 2019 ordering WBAI to resume operations and not dismantle the studio until an October 18 hearing, but by the time the injunction had been issued the studio had already been dismantled, preventing the staff from resuming local operations. An appeals court lifted most of the injunction October 10, only enjoining Pacifica from outright firing WBAI's employees. On Tuesday, October 15, 2019, WBAI's attorney, Arthur Schwartz, stated that Federal Judge Paul A. Engelmayer reactivated the temporary restraining order (TRO), extending it to close of business on the 17th.

On October 15, District Judge Engelmayer (Southern District of New York) extended the New York State Supreme Court's TRO from October 18 through the end of the next hearing, which was scheduled for Monday, October 21. Prior to the hearing, the parties were to submit briefs in support or opposition of the extension of the TRO.

In Manhattan Supreme Court, Judge Melissa Crane ordered Pacifica to return control of the station back to WBAI. She upheld the October 20, 2019, board vote to annul the decision to shutter WBAI. A lawyer for Pacifica, Kara Steger, said that the company planned to appeal the ruling. WBAI resumed local programming on November 7.

In April 2024, WBAI announced it had again fallen into arrears on tower rental and that the owner of 4 Times Square was threatening to remove WBAI "at any time" unless the station paid the $150,000 in debt it owed to the building. WBAI, which stated that such a move would mean "the end of WBAI" (a statement the general manager insisted was "not hyperbole") immediately launched a pledge drive hoping to raise the funds. Later that month, Pacifica agreed to a consent decree with the FCC over its pledge drive content containing unlawful calls to action, accepting a $25,000 fine and having its license renewal shortened to two years instead of the usual eight; the complaint had been filed by Pacifica Safety Net, a pressure group formed in hopes of rectifying Pacifica's overall financial situation, up to and including selling the WBAI license.
