= Ed Bowes =

Filmmaker, writer, and director who pioneered the use of video as cinema

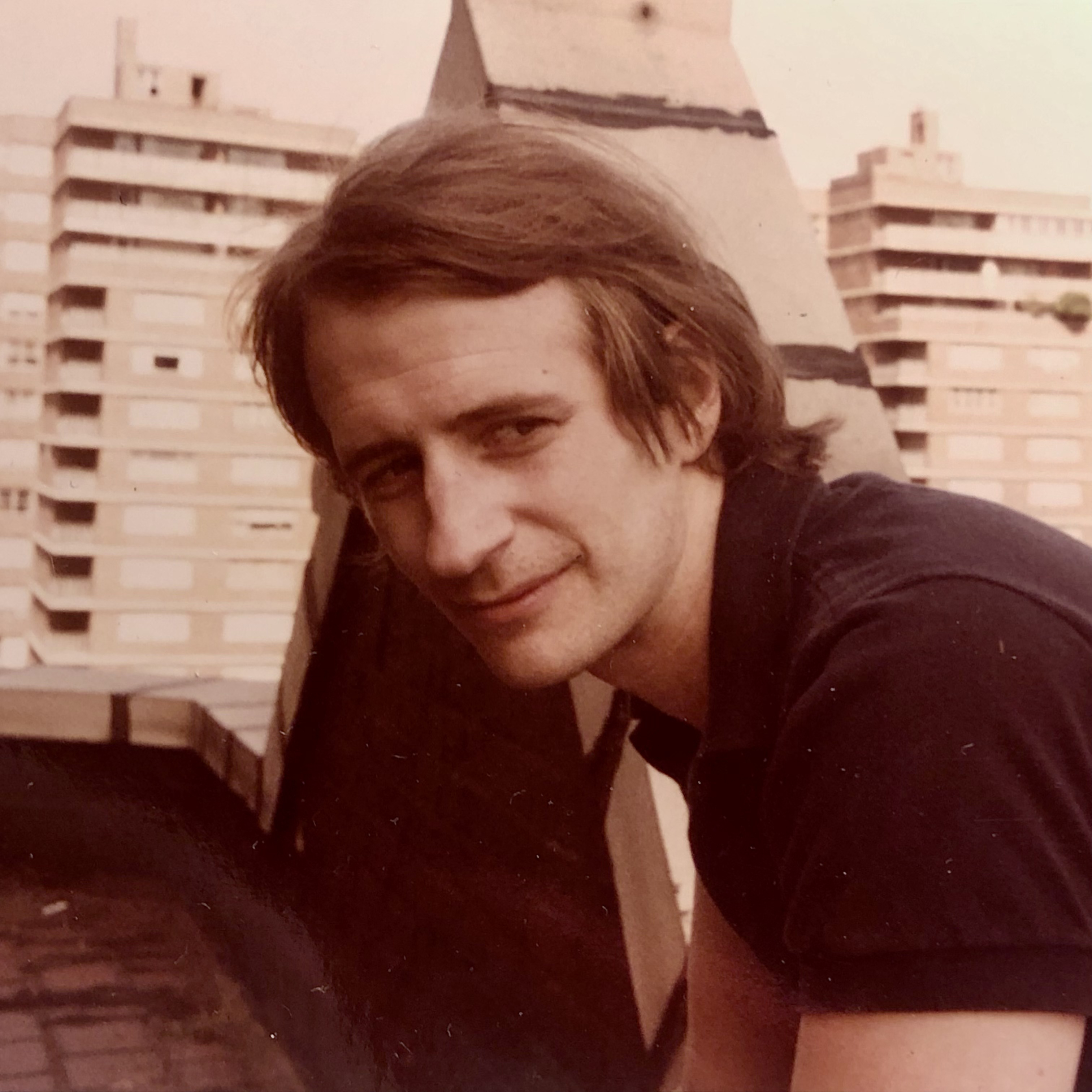
- Ed Bowes on his NYC rooftop, 1979
- Born: Edward Francis Xavier Bowes; December 7, 1944 (age 81); St. Vincent's Hospital, New York, NY
- Education: New School for Social Research, New York, NY
- Known for: Filmmaking, video, screenwriting directing, editing
- Movement: Video Art
- Spouse: Anne Waldman
- Awards: Artist-in-residence, Television Laboratory, WNET/Thirteen, John Simon Guggenheim Memorial Foundation Fellowship National Endowment for the Arts New York Council on the Arts Jerome Foundation Rockefeller Foundation Distinguished Artist-Teacher Award, SVA
- Website: https://www.edbowes.com/

A pioneer of new media, Ed Bowes is a writer, director and filmmaker who used video as cinema. The first person to make a feature-length film in video, he used poets, musicians, artists, video- and filmmakers as performers in films such as Romance (1975) and Better, Stronger (1978–79). As a result of the notice given to his camera work, Bowes began his long career as a cinematographer for filmmakers and video artists including Kathryn Bigelow, Lizzie Borden, Vito Acconci, and Robert Longo, among others. In the 1970s, he was instrumental in creating early exhibitions of video art at MoMA, The Kitchen, and other Downtown New York venues. He taught advanced filmmaking for more than three decades at the School of Visual Arts, where he influenced several generations of contemporary filmmakers. His work is in the collection of The Museum of Modern Art, New York, and Moderna Museet in Stockholm, Sweden. It is also represented in The Kitchen Archive at The Getty Research Institute and the Long Beach Museum of Art Video Archive.

== Early life and education ==
After two years at Le Moyne College in Syracuse, NY, Ed Bowes decided to pursue filmmaking and transferred to The New School for Social Research in New York City. Bowes' first job was as an assistant to filmmaker and photographer Arnold Eagle on projects with artist and filmmaker Hans Richter, and photographers Cornell Capa, Gjon Mili, and Philippe Halsman. He started working in films as an assistant editor on Paper Lion and unit manager on Alice's Restaurant and A New Leaf. He also worked on the development and line production of Jacques Levi's projected adaptation of Abbie Hoffman's Revolution for the Hell of It and Hillard Elkins' staging of A Doll's House.

== Work ==
In the 1970s, Bowes began working independently. He showed poet Bernadette Mayer how to use a 35mm camera. In 1970, they wrote the screenplay Fast Food, and in July of 1971, she produced Memory, a photographic diary of a month in their lives. This naturally led Bowes to video. He and Mayer went on to make the videos Sexless and matter in 1973. With poet Clark Coolidge, Bowes made the number of, niggle, and headland in 1974. These videos were screened at the Holly Solomon Gallery in the first exhibition of Ed Bowes' work that same year.

In 1975, when invited by Charles Ruas to adapt his video work into a radio play for the Audio-Experimental Theatre on WBAI FM—in a series that included Meredith Monk, Helen Adam, Vito Acconci, John Cage, Philip Glass, Joan Jonas, Yvonne Rainer, Robert Wilson, and Richard Foreman—Bowes returned to a previous subject and broadcast Sexless/Half a Family, featuring a large cast from the arts community.

In 1975, Bowes focused on Romance (156 min), his major feature film, which he wrote, produced and directed. Romance was the first feature-length fictional narrative made in video. In it, Bowes used cinema craft and technique to shadow and subvert the structure and content of conventional narrative fiction—for example, casting a woman, Karen Achenbach, as the lead male character. The film concludes in a final, highly choreographed, 20-minute single take. Romance premiered with a four-night screening at The Kitchen, and was also televised on WNYC.

In the same spirit of experimentation, Ed Bowes wrote, directed and produced his next three feature films: Better, Stronger (1978), How to Fly (1980) and Spitting Glass (1990). He drew his cast from the arts community, including Vito Acconci, Mary Barnan, Elizabeth Cannon, Joan Schwartz, Karen Achenbach, Gregor Hornyak, James Dagliesh, Ed Friedman, Phil O'Reilly, Rochelle Kraut, Kenny Goodman, Donald Munroe, Richard Tiernan, Anne Troy, Charles Ruas, Juris Jurjevics, Robert Longo, John McNulty, Cindy Sherman, Eric Bogosian, Rosie Hall and Ed's brother, Tom Bowes, among others.

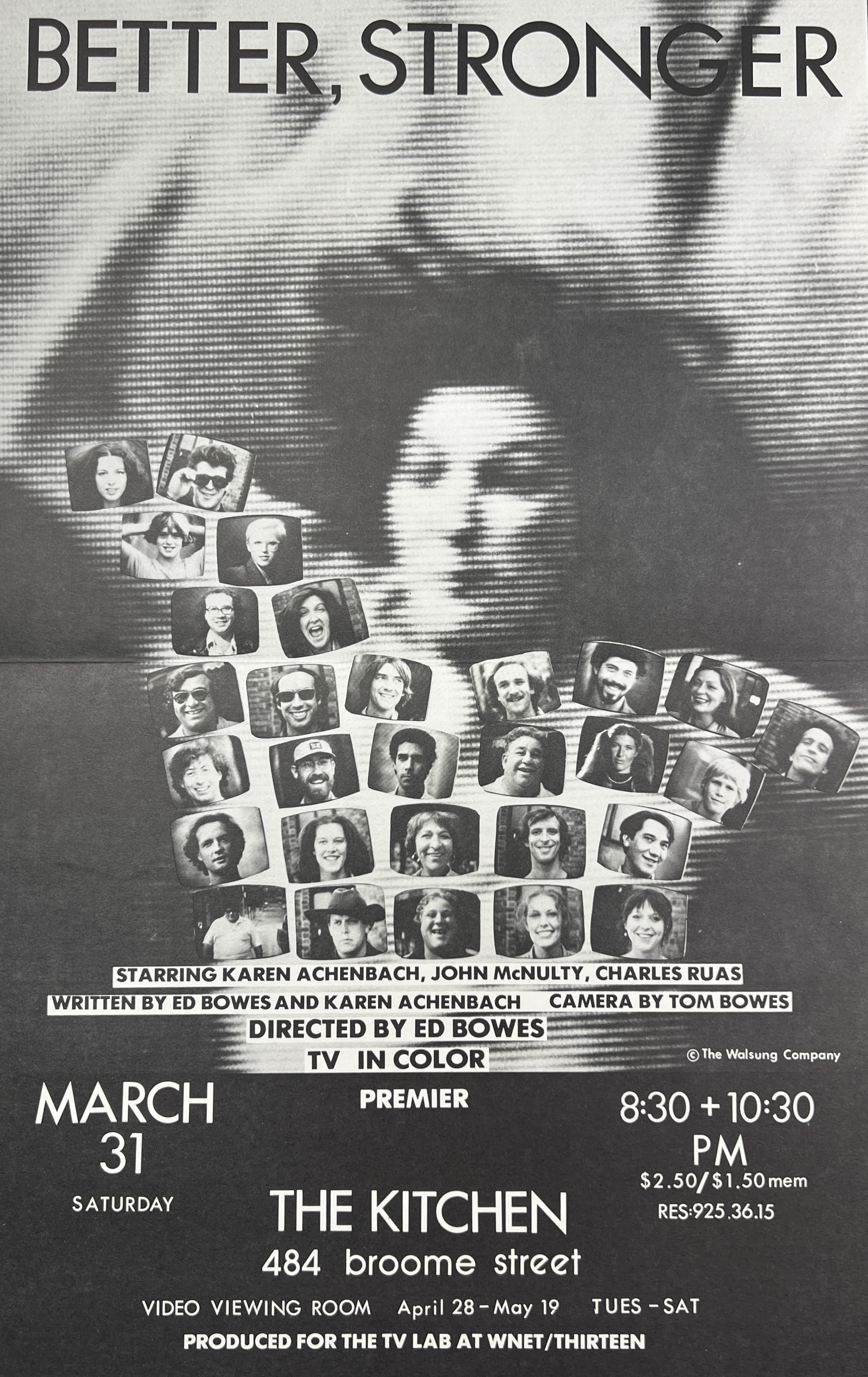
Poster from a performance at The Kitchen, March 31, 1979

Better, Stronger was a great success, shown in New York City at The Kitchen and MoMA, and screened in venues across Europe and the United States, including the U.S. Film Festival. When it was televised on WNET's The TV Lab in 1979, it received the highest ratings of the year. Sound was by Robert Longo.

With How to Fly in 1980, Bowes abandoned plot entirely, finding other forms of structure. He wanted to show that stories do not have to obsessively organize and explain data, and that television's hundreds of simultaneous, fragmented narratives—news, fiction, commercials, sports, etc.—had prepared audiences for this new type of structure.

In 1989–90, Bowes made the video feature Spitting Glass, a story about the life of a young academic starring Rosie Hall. A large part of the story takes place in the liminal areas of her consciousness. The film was produced by Amy Taubin. Costumes were by Nicole Miller. The film was commissioned by and played on Channel Four in England and on public TV throughout the United States, where it was broadcast in the 1990 season of "New Television" via WGBH/WNET. The film was featured at the Berlin Film Festival.

From the 1970s through the 1980s, Ed Bowes worked closely with his brother Tom Bowes, Video Director and a curator at The Kitchen, an experimental artist collective. Together they were instrumental in making this downtown gallery into a center for video art, with live video performances, screenings of single-channel video works, dance, and multimedia installations. Simultaneously, Ed Bowes worked with John Handhardt at the Whitney Museum and supported Barbara London's work in developing video art exhibitions at MoMA. To meet the demands of his own work, he created Walsung, a production company that gathered a loose organization of friends and collaborators. In 1985, Bowes and Walsung produced Beyond the Sound of Music, a documentary on Austrian musicians in New York, commissioned by ORF in Vienna for Austrian national television.

Bowes' innovation in Romance had made him much in-demand as a cinematographer, leading to a long career collaborating with other filmmakers and video artists. In 1976/77, he was the cinematographer for Vito Acconci's The Red Tapes. This was followed by his work on Kathryn Bigelow's cult film The Set-Up in 1978. He assisted his brother, Tom Bowes, on Bill T. Jones's "21" in 1983. Ed Bowes also worked closely with Lizzie Borden on her feminist milestone, Born in Flames in 1983; in addition to being a co-screenwriter and the cinematographer, he worked with Borden regularly on the editing of the film. He was production executive and cinematographer on director Matthew Geller's Everglades City in 1985. In 1987, he acted a key role in Sheila McLaughlin's controversial lesbian feminist film She Must Be Seeing Things.

In 1986, Ed Bowes was cinematographer for The Kitchen's landmark multidisciplinary television production Two Moon July, directed by Tom Bowes and featuring many pioneers of performance and the new media, including Laurie Anderson, David Byrne, Brian Eno, Philip Glass, Bill T. Jones, and Cindy Sherman.

In 1980, Ed Bowes accepted a position at the School of Visual Arts, as both an instructor and a member of the B.F.A. thesis committee. From 1992–99, Bowes developed a video major in the MFA Photography and Video department at SVA. He was awarded the Distinguished Artist-Teacher Award.

The year after the fall of the Berlin Wall, in 1990, Bowes' summer breaks became dedicated to work with the Soros Open Society Foundation, which called on him to focus on the development of news services in television stations of Eastern European countries behind the Iron Curtain. This involved training local newscasters and news programmers in the principles of free journalism, as well as technical issues like editing, storage, and information technology. Over the course of five summers, he worked in Bosnia (Sarajevo), Kazakhstan, Russia (Moscow), Armenia, Croatia (Zagreb) and Macedonia. Ed Bowes also worked for Internews, which was supported by the Rockefeller Foundation and the United States government. In this capacity, he unexpectedly found himself in the position to help negotiate the funding for equipment for television stations in Sarajevo.

After his assignments with the Open Society Foundation and Internews, Bowes began to spend his summers in Boulder, Colorado, working within the artistic community of the Naropa University Summer Writing Program and the Jack Kerouac School of Disembodied Poetics. He regularly showed his work at the University of Colorado, Boulder and the Boulder Public Library, and worked with Free Speech News.

Ed Bowes returned to his own feature filmmaking with Picture Book (2001–03), in which he initiated the use of photographs, often influenced by paintings, to add emotional and dramatic content to the texts that ran throughout the film. The film premiered at Lincoln Center.

In 2003, Bowes began a series of short video projects with Anne Waldman, an active member of the Outrider experimental poetry movement. There are seven to date, including La Jolie Russe, after a poem by Apollinaire (2003); Menage (2004), based on a poem by Carl Rakosi; Colors in the Mechanism of Concealment (2004), based on a poem by Waldman; Tanks Under Trees (2007), made for a performance by choreographer Douglas Dunn; The Age of the Velocipede (2007) and GRRHH: A Tribute to Michael McClure (2009), both collaborations with the poet Lisa Jarnot; and Screen Screen Text (2010).

Then with Flip, in 2006, Bowes explored disjunction in relationships. This began a series of works that, in his words, "experiment with the relationships between word and image, idea and feeling." Bowes released his ninth film, Against the Slope of Social Speech in 2008. It is a work about our ideas of death, about language and speech, sexual intimacy, and the way we encounter narrative and create it out of the things we observe.

Entanglement (2009), co-written with Anne Waldman, directly addresses cognition, desire, sensation, and the screen's representation of bodies and objects in space. Four actors explore telepathic connectedness in isolation. The Value of Small Skeletons (2010–2011) is an exploration of time and consciousness, describing the world, relationships, and imagination of a character named Merit. Following this, Bowes created a portrait that is a tribute to the late poet Akilah Oliver in the short film, Akilah Oliver: 3 Readings (2011).

Referring to the painterly term, Grisaille (2013) opens with an archival recording of the poet Robert Duncan and features performances by five interrelated women "presenters." They exist in a mysterious landscape of texture, shapes and color. In Gold Hill (2015), Bowes focused on a series of performances by poets Eva Sikelianos Hunt, Uli Miller, Britt Ford, Toni Oswald, Jade Lascelles, Amy Millennor and Mia Farago-Iwamasa. He continued featuring poetic presentations in Seahorse Powder Room (2018), in which Serena Chopra, Uli Miller, Patrick Pethybridge and Steven Taylor perform unscripted texts.

His most recent project, A Punch in the Gut of a Star (2024), was filmed in 2020 during the pandemic. Set in Colorado and based on a text by Anne Waldman and the Catalan-American poet Emma Gomis, it is centered on the dreamy, poetic pod they formed together during this enigmatic time. It premiered at the Anthology Film Archives during the retrospective, The Video Work of Ed Bowes: Language and Light, in December 2024.

== List of Works ==
=== Solo works ===
- 1976, Romance (120 min), written and directed by Ed Bowes. With Karen Achenbach, Elizabeth Cannon. Camera by Tom Bowes.
- 1978, Better, Stronger (120 min), written and directed by Ed Bowes. With Karen Achenbach and Charles Ruas. Camera by Tom Bowes.
- 1980, How to Fly (30 min), written and directed by Ed Bowes. With Tom Bowes and Karen Achenbach.
- 1990, Spitting Glass (54 min), written and directed by Ed Bowes. With Rosie Hall and cameo by Sophie Warsh. Musical score by Brooks Williams. Costumes by Nicole Miller. Produced by Amy Taubin.
- 2001, Picture Book (60 min), written and directed by Ed Bowes. With Anushka Carter and Eben Bull. Costumes by Elizabeth Cannon.
- 2005–06, Flip (42 min), written and directed by Ed Bowes. With performances by Anne Waldman, Laura Wright, Steven Taylor, Michelle Ellsworth, Ethelyn Friend, Remi Luhassois.
- 2007, Against the Slope of Social Speech (80 min), written and directed by Ed Bowes. With performances by Eleni Sikelainos, Ambika, Laura Wright, Sojourner Wright, Michelle Ellsworth, Laird Hunt, Steven Taylor, Satchel.
- 2009, Entanglement (63 min), directed by Ed Bowes. Co-written by Ed Bowes and Anne Waldman. Performances by Eleni Sikelianos, Oona Fraser, Michael Jones, Angie Yeowell. Participation from Reed Bye and Akilah Oliver.
- 2011, Akilah Oliver: 3 Readings (14 min), directed by Ed Bowes. Poetry and performance by Akilah Oliver.
- 2012, The Value of Small Skeletons (46 min), directed by Ed Bowes. Written by Ed Bowes and Anne Waldman. Performances by Tara Rynders, HR Hegnauer, Alaina Ferris, Oona Fraser.
- 2013, Grisaille (44 min), directed by Ed Bowes. Performances by Serena Chopra, HR Hegnauer, Gesel Mason, Tara Rynders, Skye Hughes.
- 2015, Gold Hill (30 min), directed by Ed Bowes. Performances by Eva Sikelianos Hunt, Uli Miller, Britt Ford, Toni Oswald, Jade Lascelles, Amy Millennor, Mia Farago-Iwamasa.
- 2018, Seahorse Powder Room (41 mins), directed by Ed Bowes. Performances by Serena Chopra, Uli Miller, Patrick Pethybridge, Steven Taylor.
- 2024, A Punch in the Gut of a Star, directed by Ed Bowes. Performances by Anne Waldman, Emma Gomis, Ed Bowes. Edited by Zohra Zaka.

=== Collaborations ===
- 1973, Sexless, with Bernadette Mayer
- 1973, Matter, with Bernadette Mayer
- 1974, The Number Of, with Clark Coolidge
- 1974, Niggle, with Clark Coolidge
- 1974, Headland, with Clark Coolidge
- 1985, Beyond the Sound of Music, for ORF Vienna
- 1987, Desert News, with Ed Friedman (unfinished)
- 2003, La Jolie Rousse, based on the work of Guillaume Apolinnaire, with Anne Waldman
- 2004, Menage, based on the work of Carl Rakosi, with Anne Waldman
- 2004, Colors in the Mechanism of Concealment, with Anne Waldman
- 2007, Tanks Under Trees, with Anne Waldman and Douglas Dunn
- 2007–2009, The Age of the Velocipede and GRRHH: A Tribute to Michael McClure, with Anne Waldman and Lisa Jarnot
- 2010, Screen Screen Test, with Anne Waldman, featuring Alaina Ferris

=== Cinematography and participation ===
- 1968, Paper Lion, directed by Alex March (assistant editor)
- 1969, Alice's Restaurant, directed by Arthur Penn (unit manager)
- 1971, A New Leaf, directed by Elaine May (unit/location manager)
- 1972, Dan Graham: Body Press (performer, with Susan Ensley)
- 1974–75, Soup & Tart, by Jean Dupuy (cinematographer)
- 1976, Vito Acconci: The Red Tapes (cinematographer)
- 1978, The Set-Up, directed by Kathryn Bigelow (cinematographer)
- 1981, Robert Longo: Empire, Corcoran Gallery of Art (cinematographer)
- 1982, Windfalls: New Thoughts on Thinking by Matthew Geller (performer)
- 1983, Bill T. Jones: 21 (cinematographer)
- 1983, Born in Flames (cinematographer, performer and co-screenwriter with Lizzie Borden)
- 1984, A Conversation with Robert Longo: Shalom Gorewitz in collaboration with Barry Blinderman (performance camera)
- 1985, Everglades City, directed by Matthew Geller (production executive and cinematographer)
- 1986, Two Moon July, directed by Tom Bowes and produced by Carlota Schoolman (cinematographer)
- 1986, Working Girls, directed by Lizzie Borden (production consultant)
- 1987, She Must Be Seeing Things, directed by Sheila McLaughlin (actor and consultant)
- 1987, Bees & Thoroughbreds, directed by Matthew Geller (cinematographer)
- 1987, Top of the Pop, by Richard Foreman and Jessica Harper (contributor)
- 1988, Split Britches directed by Matthew Geller (cinematographer)
- 1990, Total Rain, TV play by Richard Foreman (director)
- 2003, Suicide, directed by Shelly Silver, (consultant)
- 2008, In Complete World, directed by Shelly Silver (consultant)
- 2013, TOUCH, directed by Shelly Silver (consultant)

=== Radio works ===
- 1975, Sexless/Half a Family, radio play for the Audio-Experimental Theatre at WBAI-FM New York/Pacifica Radio, directed by Charles Ruas
- 2015, Sexless/Half a Family, PS1/Clocktower Art on Air, directed by David Weinstein
- 2016, Ed Bowes, Downtown History Project for PS 1/Clocktower Art on Air, Directed by David Weinstein

=== Exhibitions and Screenings ===
Ed Bowes' films have been screened on WNET and WGBH and nationally via PBS. Internationally, they have been screened at the British Film Institute, the Berlin Film Festival, International Film Festival Rotterdam and the Festival d'automne in Paris, among other European venues. The Video Work of Ed Bowes: Language and Light, a career retrospective of his works co-curated by Alystyre Julian and Anne Waldman and programmed by Jed Rapfogel, was shown in December 2024 at Anthology Film Archives.

=== Major Collections and Archives ===
Ed Bowes' work is in the collections of The Museum of Modern Art, New York; Moderna Museet, Stockholm; and the Getty Research Library. His work is represented in The Kitchen Archive and the Long Beach Museum of Art Video Archive. Much of his work as a cinematographer can be seen at Electronic Arts Intermix.
