= She Must Be Seeing Things =

1987 film by Sheila McLaughlin

- Directed by: Sheila McLaughlin
- Screenplay by: Sheila McLaughlin
- Produced by: Christine Le Goff
- Starring: Lois Weaver; Sheila Dabney
- Cinematography: Mark Daniels and Heinz Emigholz
- Music by: John Zorn
- Release date: 1987
- Running time: 95 minutes
- Country: United States
- Language: English

She Must Be Seeing Things is a 1987 lesbian feminist film directed by Sheila McLaughlin and starring Lois Weaver and Sheila Dabney. It was the film debut of both Lois Weaver and Peggy Shaw. It was controversial when first released.

== Plot ==
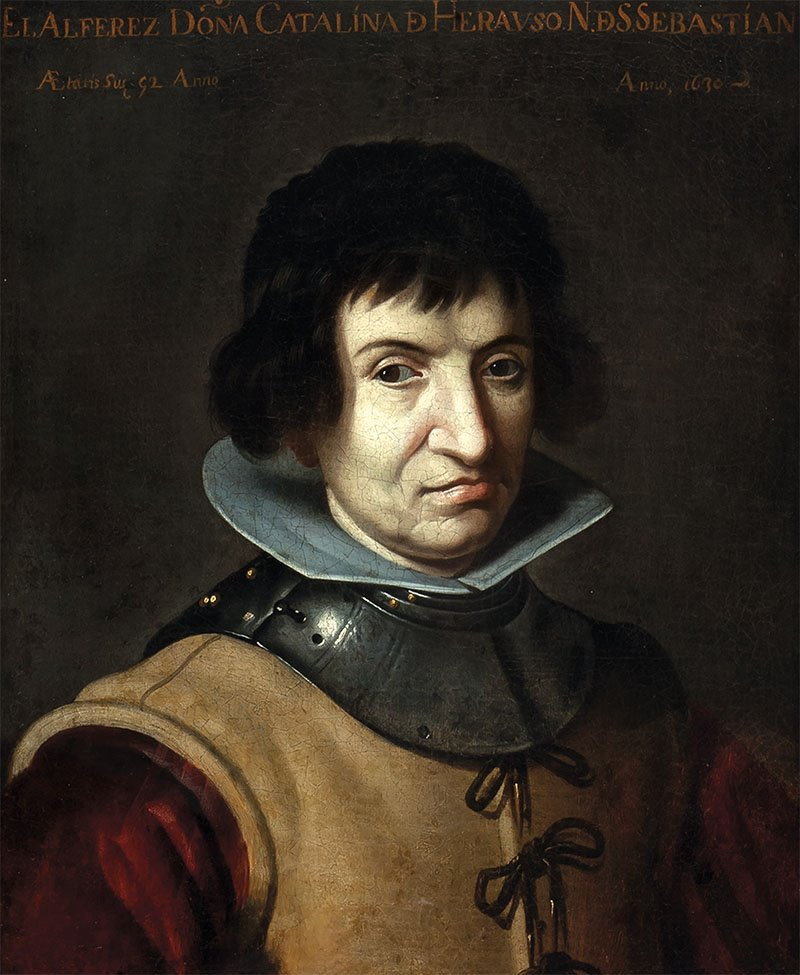
Catalina de Erauso. Portrait attributed to Juan van der Hamen.

The film focuses on the relationship between filmmaker Jo (Lois Weaver) and her girlfriend, lawyer Agatha (Sheila Dabney). While tidying the books and papers in Jo's flat, Agatha finds suggestive photos of Jo and her former (male) lovers. She also finds a diary, with more photos and pages about men that Jo has known in the past. Agatha becomes suspicious that Jo is seeing a man as well as her, and even appears to follow her.

The film is ambiguous about whether Agatha is imagining events, or whether there really are things going on that she must be seeing. Despite the strains of an arduous filming schedule for Jo's low-budget film, they are happily reconciled by the end, although the issue of whether Agatha was imagining things is apparently left unresolved. Jo's film-within-a-film involves the life of Catalina de Erauso (c. 1592–1650), a semi-legendary personality from 17th century Spain. Catalina was given a special dispensation by Pope Urban VII to live, work and dress as a man.

The Catalina story to some extent mirrors the butch-femme aspect of Jo and Agatha's relationship.

== Cast ==
- Lois Weaver as Jo
- Sheila Dabney as Agatha
- Kyle deCamp as Catalina
- John Erdman as Eric
- Ed Bowes as Richard
- Peggy Shaw as Jewelry Saleswoman

== Critical reception ==
The film has elicited a wide range or responses, from delight to revulsion and outrage.

Janet Maslin, writing in The New York Times, notes that "sexual jealousy is the main force at work ... but you'd never know it from the film's amiable, even dispassionate mood", and called it "a modest, agreeable and doubtless very personal film".

Teresa de Lauretis considers the film to be about "lesbian sexuality and its relations to fantasy". De Lauretis also notes the ambiguity inherent in the title: is she imagining things, or is it that she must be seeing things – are there things that she ought to be seeing?

Alison Darren's Lesbian Film Guide notes that it was a "deeply controversial film on release ... upset a wide section of the lesbian community by being a lesbian film largely concerned with heterosexuality ... dismissed outright by some as pornography".

== See also ==
- List of LGBT-related films directed by women
