= The Kitchen (art institution) =

Avant-garde art center in Manhattan, New York

Coordinates: 40°44′44″N 74°00′25″W

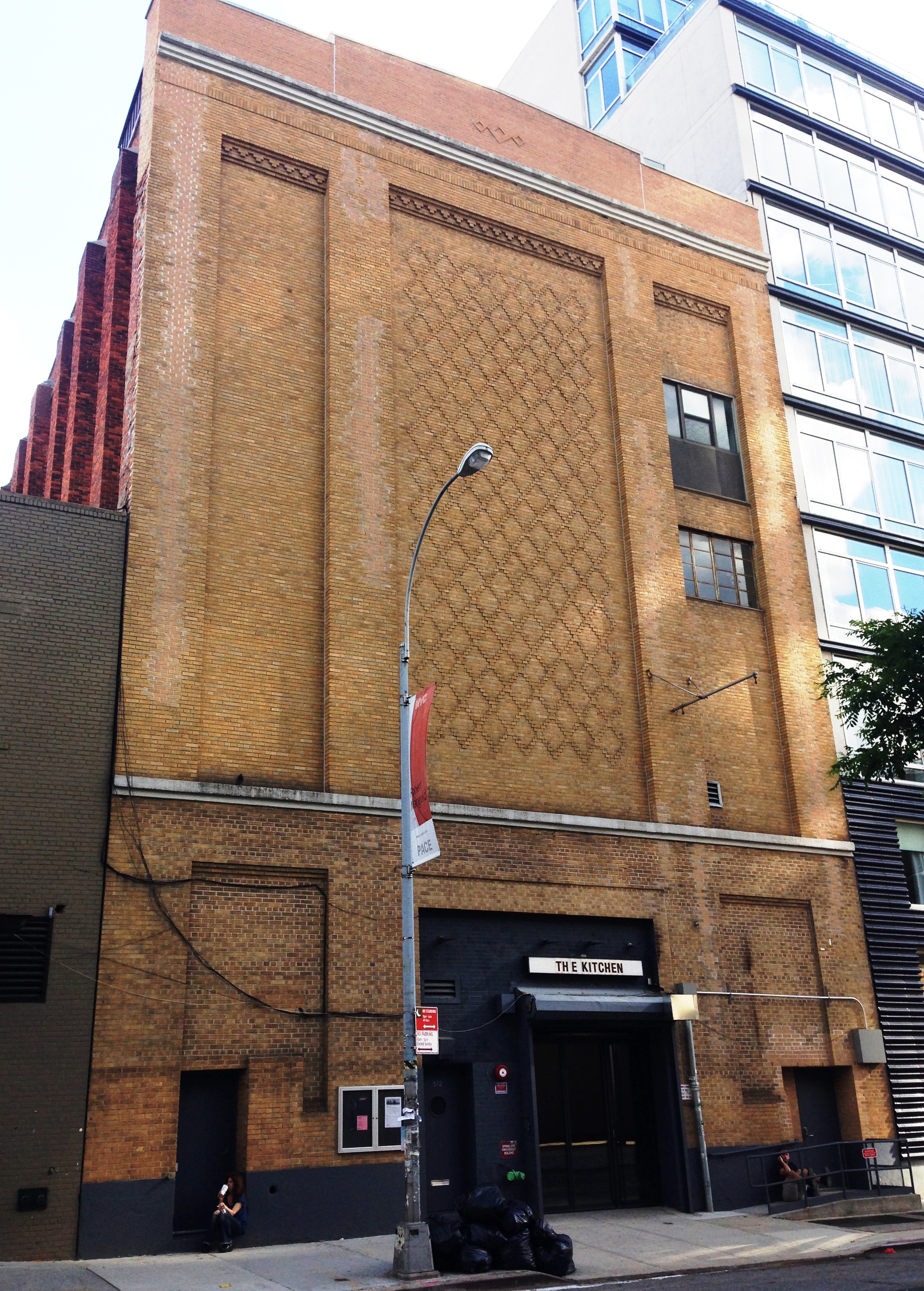
- (2017)
- Interactive map of The Kitchen
- Location: 512 West 19th Street; Manhattan, New York City
- Type: Indoor theatre

Website
- thekitchen.org

The Kitchen is a non-profit, multi-disciplinary avant-garde performance art and experimental art institution located at 512 West 19th Street, between Tenth and Eleventh Avenues in the Chelsea neighborhood of Manhattan, New York City. It was founded in Greenwich Village in 1971 by Steina and Woody Vasulka, who were frustrated at the lack of an outlet for video art.

The space takes its name from the original location, the kitchen of the Mercer Arts Center which was the only available place for the artists to screen their video art pieces. Although first intended as a location for the exhibition of video art, The Kitchen soon expanded its mission to include other forms of art and performance, and incorporated as an arts not-for-profit organization in 1973. In 1974, The Kitchen relocated to a building at the corner of Wooster and Broome Streets in SoHo. In 1987 it moved to its current location in Manhattan, New York City.

The first music director of The Kitchen was composer Rhys Chatham. The venue became known as a place where many no wave artists like Glenn Branca, Lydia Lunch and James Chance performed. Notable Kitchen alumni also include Philip Glass, Laurie Anderson, Ed Bowes, Rocco Di Pietro, John Moran, Jay Scheib, Karen Finley, Young Jean Lee's Theater Company, Peter Greenaway, Michael Nyman, Steve Reich, Pauline Oliveros, Gordon Mumma, Frederic Rzewski, Ridge Theater, The Future Sound of London, Leisure Class, Elliott Sharp, Brian Eno, Arthur Russell, Meredith Monk, Arleen Schloss, Vito Acconci, Keshavan Maslak, Elaine Summers, Lucinda Childs, Bill T. Jones, David Byrne/Talking Heads, chameckilerner, John Jasperse, Bryce Dessner, Nico Muhly, Dave Soldier, Soldier String Quartet, Komar and Melamid, ETHEL, Chris McIntyre, Sylvie Degiez, Stephen Holman, Wayne Lopes/CosmicLegends, Cindy Sherman, and Swans.

Today, The Kitchen focuses on presenting emerging artists in the areas of music, dance, performance, video, film, visual art, and literature. Its facilities include a 155-seat black box performance space and a gallery space for audio and visual art exhibitions. As the organization undergoes a multi-year renovation it is currently sited at a satellite loft space in the West Village located at 163B Bank Street, where exhibitions and performances are held.

== History ==
=== Mercer Arts Center (1971–1973) ===
Looking for a way to present their work to the public, Steina and Woody Vasulka rented the kitchen of the Mercer Arts Center, in the former Broadway Central Hotel in Greenwich Village, Manhattan. (The Mercer Arts Center was an important venue for music and theater performance in New York City from 1971 to 1973.) The Vasulkas, with help from Andy Mannik, opened The Kitchen as a presentation space for video artists on June 15, 1971. Later that year, the Vasulkas added music to their programming and named Rhys Chatham the first music director. The first Director of Video programming was Tom Bowes, who was assisted by his brother, Ed Bowes. The Kitchen continued their eclectic programming at the Mercer Arts Center until the summer of 1973, when they began planning to move to 59 Wooster Street. On August 3, 1973, the building that housed the Mercer Arts Center collapsed, making this decision final.

=== Move to SoHo (1973–1986) ===
By 1973, the Vasulkas and Rhys Chatham moved on to other projects and hired a talented arts administrator, Robert Stearns, to take over as executive director. The visual artist/composer Jim Burton became the new music director. The 1973–1974 season started in The Kitchen's new location at the corner of Wooster and Broome streets in the former LoGiudice Gallery Building. During its time on 59 Wooster Street The Kitchen emerged as New York's premiere avant-garde and experimental arts center. In addition to a performance space, a gallery and video viewing room were established at this location. At new location, The Kitchen began a program of video distribution, when video was still considered an experimental form.

=== Chelsea location (1986–present) ===
The Kitchen moved uptown to 512 West 19th Street, a former ice house, to begin the spring 1986 season and subsequently purchased the space in 1987. The inaugural event series in The Kitchen's new home was entitled New Ice Nights. In 1991 The Kitchen held its twentieth anniversary celebration: The Kitchen Turns Twenty with a retrospective mini-music festival entitled Five Generations of Composers, as well as a re-creation of Jean Dupuy’s Soup and Tart, entitled: Burp: Soup and Tart Revisited. The Kitchen remains a space for interdisciplinary and experimental work by focusing its programming on emerging artists.

In fall of 2011, after seven years as the Executive Director and Chief Curator of The Kitchen, Debra Singer handed over the reins to former Artforum Editor-in-Chief Tim Griffin.

In 2012, Hurricane Sandy flooded The Kitchen with four feet of water from the Hudson River, causing damage of about $450,000. With insurance only covering less than half the loss from the storm, the Kitchen received grants from Time Warner and the Art Dealers Association of America, as well as from nonprofit organizations and foundations (like the Andy Warhol Foundation for the Visual Arts).

In 2021, the Kitchen named Legacy Russell as the institution's next Executive Director and Chief Curator.

== Notable series and performances ==
- In 1971, Hermann Nitsch staged Aktions with bodies of slaughtered animals. Charlie Morrow staged Spirit Voices. chanting as a shaman with Gordon Mumma on saw, Carol Weber on flutes, a tuba ensemble, and high intensity soundscapes.
- In May 1975, Steve Reich and Musicians gave a performance of Work in Progress for 21 musicians and singers. Completed and premiered in 1976, the piece became Music for 18 Musicians, now regarded as one of the composer's landmark works.
- In 1977, Robert Mapplethorpe presented one of his first photography exhibitions entitled Erotic Photos at The Kitchen.
- In 1978, The Kitchen began its dance programming by establishing its Dancing In The Kitchen series curated by Cynthia Hedstrom. The goal of this series was to "stretch the established boundaries of choreographic expression and [explore] new movement vocabularies" by presenting works of dance and movement by both choreographers and non-choreographers.
- In 1979, The Kitchen began its Contemporary Music Series with goal of highlighting "connections between different musical genres and styles of composition." Noteworthy composers presented during this series include Anthony Braxton, Philip Glass, and Anthony Davis, among many others. The series was curated by experimental composer and performer Arto Lindsay.
- Also in 1979, The Kitchen hosted the New Music/New York festival and conference, with performances by Laurie Anderson, Robert Ashley, Don Cherry, Tony Conrad, Petr Kotik, Alvin Lucier, Charlemagne Palestine, Steve Reich Ensemble, among others.
- Also in 1979, the venue hosted early performances of 24→24 Music by Arthur Russell and accompanying musicians.
- In 1980, the New Music/New York festival and conference was renamed New Music America and was held in a different city each year until its final iteration in 1990.
- In 1981, Julius Eastman's The Holy Presence of Joan d'Arc was premiered at The Kitchen.
- In June 1981, The Kitchen hosted a 10th Anniversary celebration called Aluminum Nights. The two-day celebration featured film and video screenings by Steina and Woody Vasulka, Vito Acconci, Robert Ashley, Nam June Paik, The Kipper Kids, John Cage, and Robert Wilson; musical performances by Laurie Anderson, Booji Boy, Glenn Branca, Philip Glass Ensemble, Brian Eno, Fab Five Freddy, Love of Life Orchestra, Meredith Monk, Steve Reich and Musicians, Z'EV, Talking Heads, and George E. Lewis; and dance performances by Laura Dean, Bebe Miller, and Arnie Zane.
- On December 12, 1983, the Beastie Boys gave one of their early performances at The Kitchen.
- In September 1986, The Kitchen put together a multidisciplinary arts special featuring video, film, performance, visual art and music, which premiered on local public television. Produced by Carlota Schoolman and directed by Tom Bowes with camera work by Ed Bowes, Two Moon July featured work by more than 30 artists, including Vito Acconci, Laurie Anderson, Dara Birnbaum, David Byrne, Bruce Connor, Brian Eno, Philip Glass, Bill T. Jones, Arto Lindsay, John Lurie, Robert Longo, Cindy Sherman and Bill Viola. PBS aired the program nationally as a one-hour special on September 11, 1987.
- In 1991, a program called Working in The Kitchen brought together a group of choreographers who worked collaboratively over a four-month period to create performances at The Kitchen.
- In 1992, Madonna filmed scenes from her EROTICA music video at The Kitchen with director Bobby Woods
- In 1995, in the spirit of Working in The Kitchen, a series was established called Dance and Process, in which a group of emerging choreographers are given a residency to develop their work in a collaborative "workshop" environment with the guidance of an established choreographer as the curator. Past curators have included Sarah Michelson, Dean Moss, Yasuko Yokoshi, and Miguel Gutierrez. Dance and Process is The Kitchen's longest running series.
- From 1994 to 1997, the Hybrid Nights performance series was initiated by curator, Kathryn Greene also known as Caterina Verde.
- On November 10, 1995, David Hykes' Earth to the Unknown Power was performed here by The Harmonic Choir. The concert was sent live via ISDN to Le Thoronet Abbey in Southern France, where the exquisite acoustics was recorded and then broadcast back to the audience in New York.
- From 2000 to 2005, The Kitchen produced a music series called Kitchen House Blend, in which composers were commissioned to write for its "house band," a 10-piece experimental chamber ensemble whose instrumentation included drums, percussion, keyboard, trumpet, trombone, two multi-instrumentalist wind players, violin, cello, and bass. Conceived by Music Curator John King, the goal for Kitchen House Blend was to combine musicians and composers from various communities to create new works that crossed boundaries of style and performance practice. During the series, The Kitchen commissioned music by a total of 30 composers including Matthew Shipp, Susie Ibarra, Roy Nathanson, Elliott Sharp, Roy Campbell Jr., Zeena Parkins, Evan Ziporyn, Kitty Brazelton, Vijay Iyer, Anthony Coleman, Lee Hyla, David Krakauer, Ikue Mori, Lois V Vierk, and Derek Bermel. The group also performed and toured choreographer Molissa Fenley and composer and pianist Anthony Davis' early 1980s collaborative work Hemispheres.
- In 2011, The Kitchen marked its 40th anniversary with a number of events throughout the year, beginning with the Spring Benefit Gala, which honored Philip Glass on May 4. Next, were two music events celebrating the anniversary. The first event, Aluminum Music April 15–16 – which itself was a 30-year commemoration of a 1981 Kitchen event Aluminum Nights – featured Z'EV and No-Wavers Bush Tetras on April 15, followed by former music director (and Aluminum Nights co-curator) George E. Lewis with Peter Gordon's Love of Life Orchestra on the bill April 16. The second music event was September 9–10, curated by the first Kitchen Music Director Rhys Chatham, 'Pioneers of the Downtown Sound with Pauline Oliveros, Joan La Barbara, and Chatham playing on September 9 and Tony Conrad, Laurie Spiegel, and Chatham featured on September 10. The anniversary culminated with the summer-long exhibition The View from a Volcano: The Kitchen's Soho Years, 1971-85, which highlighted the rich history of the early years with video documentation and ephemera from works by such artists as Vito Acconci, Laurie Anderson, Karole Armitage, Robert Ashley, Charles Atlas, Beastie Boys, Eric Bogosian, John Cage, Jean Dupuy, Molissa Fenley, Joan Jonas, Bill T. Jones, Christian Marclay, Meredith Monk, Nam June Paik, Steve Reich, Rock Steady Crew, Arthur Russell, Elizabeth Streb, Talking Heads, Steina and Woody Vasulka, Bill Viola, and more.

== Archives ==
In 2014, the Getty Research Institute announced its acquisition of The Kitchen’s archives, including 5,410 videotapes and more than 600 audiotapes, as well as photographs and ephemera documenting performances, exhibitions and events staged from 1971 to 1999. Also included in the archive are 246 posters designed by artists like Robert Longo and Christian Marclay.

The Vašulka Kitchen Brno Archive is maintained at the Center for New Media Art in Brno Czech Republic.

== Notable directors and curators ==
- Steina and Woody Vasulka – Directors and video curators (1971–1972)
- Dimitri Devyatkin – Video director with the founders (1971–1973)
- Rhys Chatham – Music director (1972–1973 and 1977–1980)
- Arthur Russell – Music director (1974–1975)
- Garrett List – Music director (1975–1977)
- Robert Longo – Video curator (1977–1981)
- Roselee Goldberg – Gallery and performance curator (1978–1980)
- Eric Bogosian – Dance curator (1978–1981)
- Mary MacArthur (Griffin) – Director (1978–1984)
- Howard Halle – Gallery curator (1981-1985)
- George E. Lewis – Music director (1980–1982)
- Ann DeMarinis – Music director (1982–1985)
- Amy Taubin – Video curator (1983–1988)
- Tom Bowes – Production Manager and Video curator (1978–1987)
- Robert Wisdom – Music director (1985–1986)
- Arto Lindsay – Music director (1986–1987)
- Cynthia Hedstrom – Dance curator (1986–1990)
- Ira Silverberg – Literature curator (1989–1995)
- Lauren Dyer Amazeen – Executive director (1991–1997)
- John Maxwell Hobbs – Producing director/Director of New Technology (1991–1997)
- Ben Neill – Music director (1992–1998)
- Alex Kahn – Resident lighting designer (1993–1996)
- Kathryn Greene – Hybrid and performance art curator (1994–1997) aka Caterina Verde
- Anney Bonney – Hybrid and performance art curator (1997–1999)
- Neil Greenberg – Dance curator (1995–1999)
- Frederic Tuten – Literature curator (1995–2000)
- Bernadette Speach – Director (1996–1998)
- John King – Music director (1999–2003)
- Dean Moss – Dance curator (1999–2005)
- Christina Yang - Media director, Curator of visual art/New Media, Summer Institute director (1999–2005)
- Debra Singer – Executive Director & Chief Curator (2004–2011)
- Rashida Bumbray - Associate Curator (2006–2012)
- Tim Griffin – Executive Director & Chief Curator (2011–2021)
- Lumi Tan, Curator (2010–2022)
- Legacy Russell – The Kitchen's first Black Executive Director & Chief Curator (2021–present)
