= Marguerite Young =

American novelist (1908–1995)

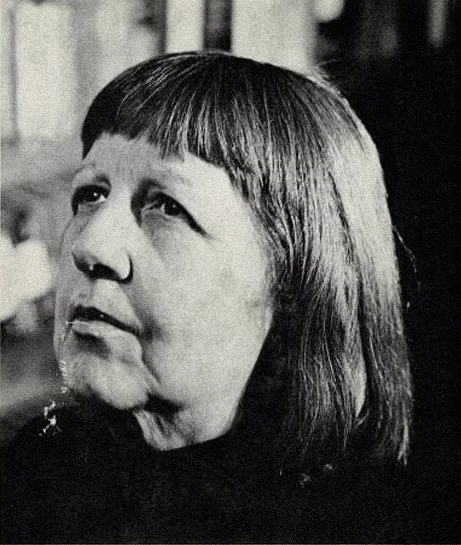
- Marguerite Young, photographed by Vytas Valaitis, 1964, for the dust jacket of Miss MacIntosh, My Darling, Scribner's Sons
- Born: Marguerite Vivian Young; August 26, 1908; Indianapolis, Indiana, United States
- Died: November 17, 1995 (aged 87); Indianapolis, Indiana, United States
- Education: Butler University B.A. University of Chicago M.A. University of Iowa Ph.D.
- Occupations: Poet; novelist; biographer; professor
- Writing career
- Notable works: Angel in the Forest; Miss MacIntosh, My Darling; Harp Song for a Radical: The Life and Times of Eugene Victor Debs

Marguerite Vivian Young (August 26, 1908 – November 17, 1995) was an American novelist and academic. She is best known for her novel Miss MacIntosh, My Darling. In her later years, she was known for teaching creative writing and as a mentor to young authors. "She was a respected literary figure as well as a cherished Greenwich Village eccentric." During her lifetime, Young wrote two books of poetry, two historical studies, one collection of short stories, one novel, and one collection of essays.

== Background ==
Young was born in Indianapolis, Indiana. Through her father, Chester Ellis Young, she was a collateral descendant of Brigham Young, and by her mother, Fay Herron Knight, she was a direct descendant of John Knox.

Young's parents separated when she was very young, and she and her sister, Naomi, were brought up by their maternal grandmother, Marguerite Herron Knight, who was convinced the child Marguerite was the reincarnation of her dead cousin, Little Harry. Her grandmother nurtured Young's love of literature.

== Career ==
=== Education ===
Young studied at Butler University in Indianapolis, receiving a BA in French and English. She then attended the University of Chicago, auditing Thornton Wilder's writing class at his invitation. She also attended the University of Iowa.

In 1936, she earned her MA in the literature of the Elizabethan and Jacobean period. She wrote her master's thesis on Euphues: The Anatomy of Wit (1578) and Euphues and his England (1580) by John Lyly, which influenced her attitude towards nature, "using birds and beasts for their symbolic value, their value as icons, as a way of saying things about people."

While attending the University of Chicago, Young had a part-time position reading Shakespeare to Minna K. Weissenbach. A patron of Edna St. Vincent Millay, Weissenbach was sometimes known as "the opium lady of Hyde Park" and she became the inspiration for the Opium Lady in Young's Miss MacIntosh, My Darling. Drug-based flights of fantasy were to make their way into the novel.

She became a doctoral candidate at the University of Iowa in 1940 and wrote papers for the philosophy department, but never finalized the degree. She did hold a Master of Arts degree (1936) from the university. She taught at the prestigious Iowa Writers' Workshop.

=== Teaching ===
She briefly taught at Shortridge High School before embarking on a distinguished literary career. In New York she held a contract lectureship in English literature during the 1960s at Fordham University.

=== Works ===
Young's first book of poetry, Prismatic Ground, was published in 1937, while she was teaching English at Shortridge High School in Indianapolis. In that same year, she visited the commune of New Harmony, Indiana, where her mother and stepfather resided.

After her MA, she taught at an Indianapolis high school and at the University of Iowa.

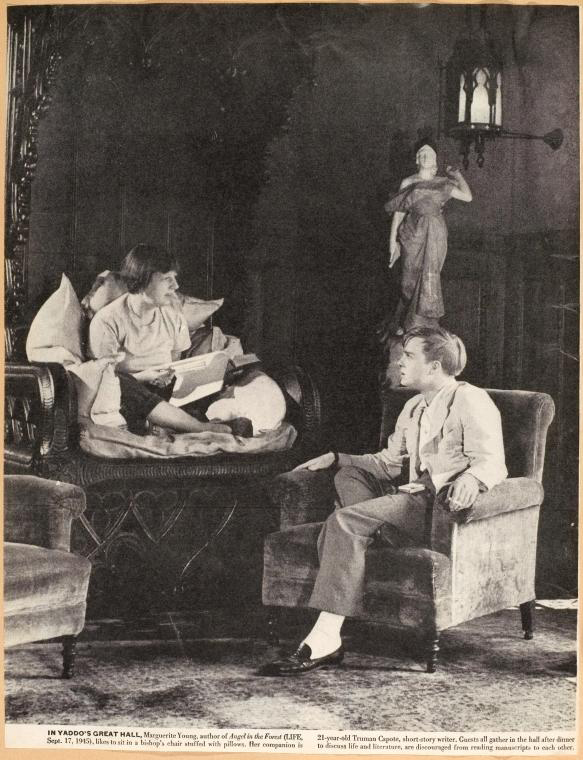
Marguerite Young and Truman Capote at Yaddo, 1946. Photo by Lisa Larsen for LIFE.

In 1943, she moved to New York, where she became known for her works Moderate Fable (1944) and Angel in the Forest (1945).

She relocated to New Harmony and spent seven years there, beginning work on Angel in the Forest, a study of utopian concepts and communities, at the same time producing Moderate Fable (1944), which won the poetry prize from the National Academy of Arts and Letters. Angel in the Forest appeared in 1945 and was well received, winning Guggenheim and Newberry Library awards.

Over the next fifty years, while maintaining an address in New York City's Greenwich Village, Young traveled extensively and was part of a wide literary circle that included Mari Sandoz, Richard Wright, Anaïs Nin, Flannery O'Connor, Marianne Hauser and Allen Tate, with whom she had an affair. She also had a complex friendship with Carson McCullers and Truman Capote, with whom she published in the international literary magazine Botteghe Oscure, edited by Princess Marguerite Chapin Caetini. She wrote articles, poetry, and book reviews while also teaching creative writing at various venues, including the New School for Social Research, Fordham University, and the Iowa Writers' Workshop.

Marguerite Young with the manuscript of Miss MacIntosh, My Darling, Scribner's Sons, published in 1965. Photographed by Vytas Valaitis, 1964.

In 1944, Scribners commissioned her to write a new work, ultimately published as the epic novel Miss MacIntosh, My Darling (1965). Although she had intended to take just two years, she did not finish her novel until 1963. Young described it as "an exploration of the illusions, hallucinations, errors of judgment in individual lives, the central scene of the novel being an opium addict's paradise." Anaïs Nin, in The Novel of the Future, calls it "an epic American novel written in a poetic style." Miss MacIntosh, My Darling was not well received critically but developed a cult following.

Young's next project was to be a biography of Hoosier poet James Whitcomb Riley, the creator of Little Orphant Annie. Her experiences in joining the protests against the Vietnam War made her turn her focus to Riley's friendship with Eugene V. Debs. The digression was to occupy the rest of her life, becoming an ambitious biography of Debs, the union organizer who evolved into the first Socialist candidate for President of the United States (1904, 1908, 1912, 1920). She projected a three-volume epic history of the people, through Debs's battles for workers rights and the development of the Locomotive Firemen's workers union. Harp Song for a Radical: The Life and Times of Eugene Victor Debs remained unfinished at the time of her death.

First edition, Harp Song for a Radical: The Life and Times of Eugene Victor Debs, 1999, published by Knopf, New York.

Part I, “Prelude in a Golden Key,” portrays Swiss agnostic Wilhelm Weitling’s cross-country tour of the pioneer utopian communities built during the settlement of the western United States. He visits the Mormon communities in Nauvoo, Illinois and Salt Lake City, Utah; the Shakers; the Amish communities in Pennsylvania; the Oneida community; the Icarians; the Rappites, and many other settlements in the wilderness. Through this perspective Young establishes that this nation was founded and settled on the principles of communal ownership and mutual assistance. In Part II of Harp Song for a Radical, Young establishes that Eugene Debs was the catalyst through which these principles became the basic tenets of the labor movement in the nineteenth and twentieth centuries.

During Marguerite Young's final illness, she was nursed by Marilyn Hamilton and Suzanne Oboler. Together, during this time, they compiled her unfinished manuscript and submitted it to her publisher. After her death, the manuscript was edited by Charles Ruas to include Young's survey of utopian communities as well as her portraits of major historical figures encountered by Debs in his struggles as a labor organizer: the portraits of Mary Todd Lincoln, James Whitcomb Riley, Joe Hill, Sojourner Truth, Brigham Young, Joseph Smith and Susan B. Anthony. This edited version of Harp Song for a Radical was published by Alfred A. Knopf in 1999. Also in her last illness, Marguerite Young returned to writing poetry.

Inviting the Muses, a collection of her stories, essays, and reviews, was published by Dalkey Archive Press in 1994. Her Collected Poems was published in 2022 by Chatwin Books/Sublunary Editions. Young's papers are at the Beinecke Library, Yale University.

== Personal life and death ==
When Marguerite Young became fully incapacitated, her niece, Daphne Nowling, came to New York from Indiana and took both Young and the contents of her Bleecker Street floor-through apartment—library, doll collection and all—to her own home in Indianapolis. There she recreated Young's apartment, where she nursed her until the end. Young died on November 17, 1995, in Indianapolis, Indiana.

== Works ==
=== Books ===
- Prismatic Ground (1937), poems
- Moderate Fable (1944), poems
- Angel in the Forest: A Fairy Tale of Two Utopias (1945), historical study
- Miss MacIntosh, My Darling (1965), novel
- Inviting the Muses: Stories, Essays, Reviews (1994)
- Harp Song for a Radical: The Life and Times of Eugene Victor Debs (1999), historical study (posthumous)
- The Collected Poems of Marguerite Young (2022)

=== Short fiction ===
Title	Publication	Collected in
"The Dead Women"	American Prefaces (1942)	Inviting the Muses
"Old James"	The Kenyon Review 6.1 (Winter 1944)	Inviting the Muses
"A Teacher of Arithmetic"	Harper's Bazaar (September 1946)	from Miss MacIntosh, My Darling
"Miss MacIntosh, My Darling"	Mademoiselle (October 1946)	from Miss MacIntosh, My Darling
"Mr. Bonebreaker"	Harper's Bazaar (February 1948)	from Miss MacIntosh, My Darling
"The Arctic Explorer at the Stock Exchange"	The Tiger's Eye 6 (December 1948)	from Miss MacIntosh, My Darling
"The Opium Lady"	Botteghe Oscure 10 (1952)	from Miss MacIntosh, My Darling
"The Hangman's Tale"	Discovery 1 (1953)	from Miss MacIntosh, My Darling
"No Old Maid's Romance"	Western Review 18.4 (Summer 1954)	from Miss MacIntosh, My Darling
"My Mother's Evening Guests"	New World Writing 6 (October 1954)	from Miss MacIntosh, My Darling
"The Strange Death of Mr. Spitzer"	Harper's Bazaar (October 1955)	from Miss MacIntosh, My Darling
"Miss MacIntosh, My Darling"	The Literary Review 5.1 (Autumn 1961)	from Miss MacIntosh, My Darling
"My Grandmother's Foot"	Inviting the Muses (1994)	Inviting the Muses

== Influences ==
Starting in 1975, Charles Ruas produced for Pacifica radio station WBAI in New York a year-long series of readings from Miss MacIntosh, My Darling called The Reading Experiment. The readings were by Young's contemporaries in the literary, theatre, and journalistic worlds, such as Leo Lerman, Wyatt Cooper, Osceola Archer, Marian Seldes, Ruth Ford, James Coco, Peggy Cass, and Earle Hyman. The artist Rob Wynne scored each program with concrete sound effects and atonal and harmonic music, as well as opera. The programs were distributed nationally through the Pacifica Radio Network. In 2014, David Weinstein, Director of the Clocktower Gallery, and Tennae Maki, restored the series and digitized it, making it available through Art International Radio's Internet station "Art on Air." Those recordings are now available on the Who Is Marguerite Young? website. Renewed interest in the book resulted in the publication in 1979 of a boxed two-volume paperback edition, with an Introduction by Anaïs Nin, by Harcourt Brace Jovanovich, as well as a two-volume paperback edition in 1993 by Dalkey Archive. In 2024, Dalkey Archive Press published a new one-volume edition that, despite returning the novel to print after decades of unavailability, introduced numerous typographical errors into the text.

- Radio readings from Miss Macintosh, My Darling (1976–1977)
- Marguerite Young Interview
- Anaïs Nin and Marguerite Young (c. 1975)

== Sources ==
- "LIFE visits Yaddo". Life Magazine. 21 (3). Life: 110. July 15, 1946.
- "Harp Song for a Radical". Stephen Shaviro.
- "Who is Marguerite Young?". Connie Eichenlaub.
- "Marguerite Young, 1908–1995." Poetry Foundation. Retrieved February 10, 2024.
