= Tianjin Museum of Modern History =

- Location within China
- Established: 2002
- Location: No.314 Hebei Road, Heping District, Tianjin
- Coordinates: 39.112719°N 117.199532°E
- Type: History Museum
- Website: www.tjmodernmuseum.org

Tianjin Museum of Modern History (TMM) is located at No. 314 Hebei Road, in Heping District, Tianjin, the so-called “Five Great Avenues” area (a community of Western-style villas). TMM is mainly engaged in the study of the history of interactions between Tianjin and the West from the mid-16th century to the mid-20th century. It has made great efforts to preserve the cultural heritages of the former nine concessions in Tianjin. In the museum, a great number of old historical photos and objects collected from all over the world are exhibited, many of which are not available elsewhere in China and have great research value.

== History ==
TMM was established by Tianjin Historical and Cultural Promotion Association in September, 2002. The founder is Mrs. Hang Ying. Construction of an expanded TMM building at its original address began in 2011 and was completed in 2013. The new, greatly expanded permanent exhibitions were completed in 2015 and then reopened to public free of charge.

== Exhibitions ==
Tianjin is a major metropolitan area in China. Its development began in 1404 C.E. when it was officially established as a town during the reign of Emperor Yongle (Zhu Di) of the Ming Dynasty. According to some old records, Emperor Yongle himself founded and named Tianjin. In 1860, Tianjin became North China’s first and largest port to be opened for trade and other interaction with Western countries. Tianjin is the strategic gateway to the capital and is close to Bohai Bay, a historically important region for fishing and coastal trade. Tianjin's geographic location helped to make it a place of primary importance for interactions between Chinese and other civilizations in modern times. It remained the great economic and cultural center of the North until the early years of the People's Republic of China. Especially after the Westernization Movement in the late 19th century, Tianjin led China's industrial revolution and modernization. More than one hundred first instances of notable changes in China happened at Tianjin, and illustrate Tianjin's great importance in modern Chinese history. When you view China's modern history, you will find that Tianjin is a very special and important window through which to look. Many famous historical events happened here.

TMM focuses on collecting and exhibiting materials, and gathering and presenting information, regarding the history of modern Tianjin. The permanent exhibitions on the second and third floors have four parts-- Modern China through the Eyes of Tianjin: 100 Firsts, Tianjin in Historical Western Works of Art, Commemorating 1900, and Western Historical and Cultural Records.

- The First Part (Modern China through the Eyes of Tianjin: 100 Firsts):

This part elaborates Tianjin's pioneering role during the course of China's modern development. It covers 18 aspects such as military, education, finance, industry, science and technology, foreign trade, and art. In total, there are exhibits regarding 112 notable changes in China which first happened at Tianjin. These exhibits help to highlight the major importance of Tianjin to the modern economic and cultural development of China as a whole.

- The Second Part (Tianjin in Historical Western Works of Art):

Prior to the invention of photography, Western etchings and watercolor paintings were a primary means by which scenes in China were shown realistically. The exhibits in this part are about Western works of art which faithfully present Tianjin's features in the latter half of the 19th century, especially the landscapes around waterways and port facilities.

- The Third Part: (Commemorating 1900):

As the gateway to the nation's capital and as a place of primary importance for interactions between China and other nations, Tianjin is a unique microcosm for viewing the vicissitudes in China's modern history. This part includes exhibits regarding painful aspects of the history shared by Tianjin and by modern China generally, with regard to suffering, deaths and destruction, and forced partitions and relinquishments, again and again, on account of foreign military invasions and attacks. Especially noteworthy are the events of 1900, during which the Eight-Power Allied Forces occupied Tianjin and invaded Beijing. As a result of those events, Tianjin became divided into nine regions, eight of which were concessions controlled by foreign powers.

- The Fourth Part (Western Historical and Cultural Records):

This part presents a distinctive gallery of Western historical figures from various national, ethnic, and professional backgrounds, all of whom contributed to Tianjin's rich and unique cultural atmosphere. It showcases over thirty Western celebrities and their stories while living in Tianjin, including the 31st American president Herbert Clark Hoover, the German diplomatic consultant Gustav Detring, the German military expert Constantin von Hanneken, the French geologist Emile Licent, and British ballerina Dame Margot Fonteyn.

The stained glass project is another special feature of TMM. All of the exquisite stained glass displays are entirely handmade with wonderful workmanship, and represent the beauty of important Western-style buildings at Tianjin. More than 30 bright and colorful stained glass displays decorate TMM's inner building and enhance the exhibition.

== Events ==
- In April, 2002, the exhibition of “Historical and Cultural Exchange between China and Europe--Bridge” was organized by TMM;
- In September, 2002, an “Old China Hands Reunion” event was held at TMM. The participants included 30 foreigners who were born at or lived at Tianjin in the 1920s-1950s period, and who came to the Tianjin reunion from 7 countries.
- During April–May, 2004, TMM representatives traveled to the exhibition “600 Years of Urban Development and Planning in and Around Tianjin” at Cornell University
- In June, 2006, the “City, Space and People International Conference” was hosted by TMM. In total, more than 100 scholars and experts from China, the United States, Great Britain, France, Italy and Japan attended this seminar. More than 40 of these scholars gave presentations on topics in such fields as urbanology, urban ecology, sociology, and architecture.
- In July, 2007, the Publication Ceremony of Modern China through the Eyes of Tianjin: 100 Firsts was held;
- In April, 2017, “China-Belgium 120 Years of Their Shared History - A Joint Exhibition of the Historical Links between Brussels and Tianjin” was presented in Belgium at Universite Libre de Bruxelles by TMM with special assistance from Charles Lagrange, and from May 5 to June 25, the same exhibition was held in Tianjin;
- From May 22 to June 3, 2017, "Tianjin-Worms Joint Exhibition of Their Historical Links" was presented jointly in Worms, Germany by TMM and Hochschule Worms;
- From May 31 to July 31, 2017, "Tianjin-Hamburg Joint Exhibition of Their Historical Links" was presented jointly in Hamburg, Germany by TMM and the Hamburg Chamber of Commerce.

== Publications ==
- Modern China through the Eyes of Tianjin: 100 Firsts (in English; there is also an edition in Chinese): This book is a comprehensive photo essay with rich academic value. The selections in 100 Firsts highlight the leading role of modern Tianjin as the site of many of the earliest happenings recorded in China, in such fields as military development, education, finance, industry, science and technology, foreign trade, art, etc. (WANG Shuzu, HANG Ying. Tianjin: Tianjin People's Publishing House, May 2007)
- The Bridges of Tianjin (in Chinese): The architectural history of bridges at Tianjin is a notable aspect of the history of Tianjin's economic development. The pontoon bridge used during the Qing period, the first steel bridge “Da Hong Bridge” constructed in 1888, and the much more recently built overpass bridge all witness the development of Tianjin, and add beautiful colors to it. (LI Quanxi, HANG Ying. Tianjin: Tianjin Education Press, June 2008)
- Constantin von Hanneken’s Biography (in Chinese): The authors of this book traveled to Europe and the United States several times to visit with von Hanneken's descendants, and obtained a large number of first-hand materials from foreign libraries and archives, such as letters and documents of von Hanneken. This book is an effort to present an accurate record of the remarkable life of this very important foreigner serving in the Qing government, as well as his opinions about political and military matters. (LIU Jinqiu, LIU Yue. Shanghai: Wenhui Press, January 2011)
- The United States 15th Infantry Regiment in China (1912-1938) (Chinese translation): The 15th Infantry Regiment of the US Army was stationed in Tianjin from 1912 to 1938. This book is a detailed description of the history, military actions and daily life of this foreign army regiment in China. (Alfred Emile Cornebise, translated by LIU Yue. Beijing: The Writers Publishing House, June 2011)
- The Past (in Chinese): This book is aimed to make people at home and abroad get a better understanding of the rich history, unique culture, and economic development of Tianjin. (WANG Shuzu, HANG Ying. Tianjin: Tianjin Classics Publishing House, December 2010)
- The Foreign Consultants of Li Hongzhang-- Gustav Detring and Constantin von Hanneken (in Chinese): This book introduces the lives of Gustav Detring and Hanneken, two foreign consultants of Li Hongzhang who was a senior minister and leader of the Westernization Movement in the late Qing Dynasty. These two ambitious young people participated in China's reforms of its military, economy, diplomacy, and education, and also made their own careers in China. (ZHANG Chang, LIU Yue. Taipei: Biography Publishing House, October 2012)
- China, 1900 —The Eyewitnesses Speak (Chinese translation): This book is about political, military and cultural conflicts between China and the West at the time of the Boxer Uprising in 1900. The contents consist primarily of letters, diaries and photos from foreign eyewitnesses of events during Boxer Uprising. (Frederic A. Sharf, Peter Harrington, et al., translated by GU Ming. Tianjin: Tianjin People's Publishing House, January 2010)

== Oral history study ==
This part is a special aspect of TMM. Over the years, TMM features exhibitions and programs driven and supported by academic researches. A team of experts traveled to Europe and North America to interview former foreign residents of Tianjin or their descendants, from whom valuable oral historical videos were recorded.

== Opening time ==
TMM is open from Tuesday to Sunday, from 9:30 to 12:00 and 14:00 to 16:30 for free. It is closed on Mondays.
