= Miss MacIntosh, My Darling =

1965 novel by Marguerite Young

- Cover of the first edition
- Author: Marguerite Young
- Cover artist: Paul Bacon
- Language: English
- Genre: Psychological novel
- Published: 1965 (Scribner's)
- Publication place: United States
- Pages: 1198

Miss MacIntosh, My Darling is a novel by Marguerite Young. She has described it as "an exploration of the illusions, hallucinations, errors of judgment in individual lives, the central scene of the novel being an opium addict's paradise." At 750,000 words, it is one of the longest single-volume novels in the English language.

== Writing the novel ==
Young began writing the novel in 1945, expecting it would take two years. She worked on it daily, and did not finish until 1964. Young said that had she known it would take her so long, she would never have started.

Young had been encouraged by Maxwell Perkins, when she submitted a 40-page initial manuscript for the novel, then named Worm in the Wheat. Over the years, staff at Scribner's had read portions of the work-in-progress. Nevertheless, the full manuscript was something of a surprise when delivered in February 1964:

When the final great batch of typescript arrived, I looked with some apprehension at the number on the last page. The number was 3,449. I spoke of it to the manufacturing department, who looked grim. Someone helpfully mentioned the volumes of Proust.

— Burroughs Mitchell, The Chicago Tribune

The book was typeset by computer and consumed "38 miles of computer tape".

According to the dust jacket,

At one time in the Gare Lazare in Paris, seven suitcases of the manuscript were lost—but were retrieved by seven men from Cook's with seven wheelbarrows.

In a 1993 interview, Young confirmed the story. During the interview, Young stated that Miss MacIntosh was the only invented character in the novel, the rest having all been based on real people. She also said that she had thought that What Cheer, Iowa was a fictional place.

== Character summary ==
The following brief summaries refer to the "core" descriptions, which are frequently questioned and contradicted. Some are inconsistent, as in dreams.

Miss Vera Cartwheel
the novel's first-person narrator, on a cross-country bus ride, hoping to locate her childhood nursemaid and nanny, Miss MacIntosh.
Mrs. Catherine Helena Cartwheel, née Snowden
Vera's mother, the opium lady, living in her New England Boston-area seaside mansion, lost in a permanent opium dream. Confined to her bed, she is still an eyewitness to everything in her staff's life. She's not sure if she is alive or dead.
Miss Georgia MacIntosh
frequently called "Miss MacIntosh, my darling" by Vera, she hails from What Cheer, Iowa, and is immune to the elder Cartwheel's dreaming. One day, about a month after Vera's fourteenth birthday, she was gone, with all personal effects left behind, dead or disappeared. Completely bald and hairless since birth, she was hit by a bus in Seattle, and had one breast amputated. She strongly disapproves of electric lights. Named relatives include her brother Richard, who disappeared while evangelizing Pacific Islanders, her father John Knox, and her mother Mercy.
Mr. Joachim Spitzer
lawyer who specializes in the affairs of the dead, especially tracing heirs. A composer, now of silent music he never writes down or shares, and an amateur lepidopterist. He is helplessly sweet on Mrs. Cartwheel, and usually lost in her dreaming.
Peron Spitzer
Joachim's identical twin brother, athletic, raffish, gambles on cards and horses, a suicide after he lost the Spitzer inheritance. Mrs. Cartwheel was sweet on him. After Peron's death, Joachim was often uncertain whether he was the one who died, or whether he was really Peron.
An old clam-digger
Mr. Spitzer's manservant, given to burying himself in the sand.
Moses Hunnecker
the bus-driver, drunk, so hateful of Democrats that he never votes lest he pull the wrong lever, and he refuses to cut his hair, since the Democrats haven't taxed hair yet. Constantly argues with the non-existent Doctor.
Doctor Justice O'Leary
non-existent general practitioner, he lost his mind, then his license. Doesn't deliver non-existent babies from non-existent women. He makes his housecalls, no matter what the weather, despite the fact that his car has no roof, windows, or wheels. He often argues with his dead sister Sarah.
Sarah O'Leary
dead sister of the Doctor, she died at age one, about sixty years ago, but still seeks the Doctor out.
Madge Capehorn née Edwards
passenger on the bus, pregnant, riding with her husband, forever jealous of the woman her husband married (her younger, non-pregnant self), and of Jackie, whom she thinks her husband thinks he wanted to marry. She usually finds the worst interpretation of other people.
Homer Capehorn
football player, passenger on the bus, apparently still a virgin. He usually finds the best interpretation of other people.
Jacqueline "Jackie" White
classmate of Homer, costar with him in the school pageant, the most desired girl in school, she went out with no one, and is now dying.
James
the Cartwheel chauffeur, but because he likes to shoot things, he left long ago, and was last seen driving a taxicab in Nome, Alaska.
The black coachman
the most important Cartwheel family employee of days gone by, supposedly buried next to the sea with his carriage and four white horses, and perhaps a passenger or two, but Mr. Spitzer never answers Mrs. Cartwheel's questions about him.
Cousin Hannah Freemount-Snowden
legendary adventurer, mountain climber, desert crosser, who strongly loathes men. A committed suffragette. Deceased.
Jock Cartwheel
Catherine's husband, he disappeared while mountain climbing in Europe. She has no clear memory of him or his name, and is uncertain whether there was a marriage or a funeral.
Lorena
a former ward of Miss MacIntosh, her only love. She grew up to be a fan dancer and strip-tease.
The Tavern's landlord
Survivor of the sinkings of the Titanic, the Lusitania, the White Star Castle, and the Prince Edward.
The Tavern's landlady
His wife, a notably poor speller.
Mr. Titus Bonebreaker
A former women's shoes' salesman from St. Louis who became a doomsday street preacher in Chicago. He thought he was rescuing a young and wanton Miss MacIntosh when he became engaged to her, but he fled the night before their wedding when she revealed she was bald and one-breasted, leaving behind his umbrella and watch.
Mr. Weed
a part-time hangman, or his shadow. His first wife Marie hung herself, his current wife Julia has the mind of a child.
Lisa Lunde
a young would-be physicist who supports herself by helping Mrs. Cartwheel.
Mrs. Hogden
an old, fat, experienced teacher of arithmetic, claims to have been hired by Mrs. Cartwheel, moves in and settles herself in Vera's deserted playroom. Always an optimist, she steals other people's dreams.
Esther Longtree
a fat, perpetually pregnant, waitress at the Greasy Spoon and the mother of numerous stillborns. She fears being tried for "murdering" them.
Rosemary
Esther's stillborn twin sister. Esther had, according to her mother, literally kicked Rosemary out of the womb several months prematurely. Also according to her mother, Rosemary was destined to be the perfect daughter, smart, beautiful, well-behaved, unlike Esther.
Walter
Esther's first mixed race child. The father survived a lynching and fled north. Walter, killed by Esther at birth, now about ten years old, he keeps asking Esther why she killed him, and asks for his father.
The Chicago detective
the father, so he thinks, of three children by Esther.
The little toy salesman
so little, he feeds out of a baby bottle, he was the lone survivor of a ship sunk during a violent storm.
Joe Goldberg
a former featherweight boxing champion, dying, wants to see what he believes is his child by Esther.
The stone deaf man
a guest at the Tavern, he can't stop singing about his life and love. Vera falls in love with his voice.
Lucie Bell
the "stone deaf man"'s lover for the night, she either doesn't exist, is mute, or asleep; Vera never finds out.
Solomon
the Cartwheel household turtle.
Friday
the Cartwheel household dog.

== Sources ==
Minna K. Weissenbach, a rich patron of Edna St. Vincent Millay, also known as the opium lady of Hyde Park, was the inspiration for Catherine Cartwheel.

Harriet Monroe, the founding editor of Poetry, was the inspiration for Hannah Freemount-Snowden.

Howard Mitcham, a deaf Greenwich Village artist and bohemian, was the inspiration for the stone-deaf man.

== Influence and reception ==
As she worked on The Accidental Tourist, Anne Tyler cured spells of writer's block by reading pages from Miss MacIntosh at random. "Whatever page I turned to, it seemed, a glorious wealth of words swooped out at me." Tyler made Young's novel a traveling companion for her main character Macon Leary. A hardcover edition of the book was used as a prop in William Hurt's suitcase in the film adaptation.

Anaïs Nin, a friend and neighbor of Young, apparently the novel's first reader, wrote a review for the Los Angeles Times. This review also appeared in the sixth volume of her diaries after their publication. It served as an introduction to the 1979 Harcourt Brace Jovanovich paperback edition.

A number of writers have given the work high praise.

Marguerite Young is unquestionably a genius.

— Kurt Vonnegut

A novel of massive achievement.

— Jerzy Kosinski

The most important work in American literature since ... Moby-Dick.

— Howell Pearre, Nashville Banner

A work of stunning magnitude and beauty....in the great styles of Joyce or Broch or Melville or Faulkner...a masterwork.

— William Goyen, New York Times Book Review, 9/12/1965

Miss MacIntosh, My Darling stands out in my mind as the most significant innovative novel since Ulysses and The Waves.

— Nona Balakian

In her zeal to demonstrate that nothing lives except in the imagination, Miss Young, with superb virtuosity, may have written a novel that in the profoundest sense does not exist.

— Melvin Maddocks, Christian Science Monitor, 9/16/1965
