= Sheila McLaughlin =

American filmmaker and actress (born 1950)

Sheila McLaughlin (born 1950) is an American director, producer, screenwriter, actor, and photographer. She wrote and directed the controversial film, She Must Be Seeing Things (1987). Her debut feature film, Committed (1984), which she co-directed with writer Lynne Tillman, is an experimental narrative of the life of Frances Farmer, shot on a low budget of $45,000. McLaughlin's films have been described as presenting "a grasp of a developing new feminist language of cinema."

== Personal life ==
McLaughlin is lesbian. She left filmmaking to practice acupuncture.

== Filmography ==
Year	Title	Role	Director	Writer	Producer	Notes
1978	Artificial Memory		Yes	Yes	Yes	Short film
1982	Ordinary Sentence (Normalsatz)	(n/a)				(directed by Heinz Emigholz)
1983	Born in Flames	Other Leader				also: camera operator
1984	Committed	Frances Farmer	Yes	Yes	Yes	also: editor
1985	Die Basis des Make-Up (The Base of Make-Up)	(n/a)				(directed by Heinz Emigholz)
1985	Seduction: The Cruel Woman (Verführung: Die grausame Frau)	Justine				
1987	She Must Be Seeing Things		Yes	Yes		
1988	The Big Blue	Myrna				(directed by Andrew Horn)
1988	Die Wiese der Sachen (The Meadow of Things)	(n/a)				(directed by Heinz Emigholz)

== See also ==
- List of female film and television directors
- List of lesbian filmmakers
- List of LGBT-related films directed by women
