= Olympics on United States television =

The Olympic Games (Summer and Winter) have been televised in the United States since 1960. It has become one of the most popular programs on USA television every four and then two years. The Olympics has been exclusively broadcast on NBC and NBCUniversal's TV networks in the United States since 1988 for the Summer Olympics and 2002 for the Winter Olympics. American television companies are one of the major sources of revenue for the IOC.

== History ==
=== 1960s ===
The first telecast of the Olympics on American TV was from the 1960 Winter Olympics in Squaw Valley, California. It was shown on CBS. During the games, officials asked Tony Verna, one of the members of the production staff, if it could use its videotape equipment to determine whether or not a slalom skier missed a gate. Verna then returned to CBS headquarters in New York City and developed the first instant replay system, which debuted at the Army–Navy football game in 1963.

Later that year, CBS showed the 1960 Summer Olympics from Rome. The network showed about 20 hours of coverage of track and field, swimming, and other sports. Because communications satellites, which would have provided direct transmissions between the United States and Italy, were not yet available, production staff members flew footage from Rome to CBS headquarters in New York for later telecast. Jim McKay, then a relatively unknown radio and TV personality, was the host.

A different network showed the 1964 Winter Olympics: ABC. Roone Arledge won broadcast rights for his network and began a relationship with the Olympics that would last over two decades. The program used many of the same production staff from ABC's Wide World of Sports, as well as the same host, McKay, who moved to ABC in 1961. The following October, NBC showed the 1964 Summer Olympics from Tokyo, marking its Olympic TV debut. This time, NBC used the Syncom 3 satellite for direct broadcasts, with the opening ceremonies being broadcast live and in color (the first live color television program ever transmitted by satellite from overseas to the United States; the opening and closing ceremonies were the only portions of NBC's 1964 coverage from Tokyo seen in color). ABC showed both the 1968 Winter Olympics and the 1968 Summer Olympics; both of which were (with the exception of a handful of events) broadcast in color.

Also recorded at the 1968 Summer Olympics was the Black Power salute, a civil rights protest put on by American athletes John Carlos and Tommie Smith at their award ceremony for the 200-meter dash. After the IOC had banned Smith and Carlos, reporter Howard Cosell criticized the committee, calling them "pompous, arrogant, medieval minded men who regard the games as a private social preserve for their tiny clique..." and voiced his support for the African American athletes.

=== 1970s ===
NBC showed the 1972 Winter Olympics from Sapporo, Japan, then ABC returned to carry the 1972 Summer Olympics in Munich, Germany. It was during the Summer Games that terrorists attacked the Olympic Village and killed 11 Israeli athletes. Although Chris Schenkel was the actual host of the Games that year, Arledge assigned the story to McKay largely because he had been a local news anchor in Baltimore, Maryland prior to joining CBS (and later ABC). McKay was joined on set by ABC news correspondent (and former and future evening news anchor) Peter Jennings, and coverage continued for many hours until the outcome was known. McKay later won an Emmy Award for his coverage.

By the time the 1976 edition came around, McKay was installed as ABC's Olympic host, a role he would play throughout the 1970s and '80s.

=== 1980s ===
ABC aired the 1980 Winter Olympics, 1984 Winter and Summer, and the 1988 Winter Olympics. After that, the network, at the insistence of new owner Capital Cities Communications (much to the chagrin of Roone Arledge's successor at ABC Sports, Dennis Swanson), opted not to bid for the rights to show any future Games.

NBC had won the U.S. broadcast rights for the 1980 Summer Olympics, paying a reported $87 million for the rights, but when the United States announced its boycott in protest of the Soviet invasion of Afghanistan, the telecasts were cancelled.

NBC then bid for, and won, the rights to show the 1988 Summer Olympics. Network officials convinced the organizers in Seoul to stage most of its gold-medal finals in the afternoon, which is prime time of the previous night in the U.S. Bryant Gumbel was the host that year.

=== 1990s ===
==== NBC ====
Just as his mentor Roone Arledge had before, Dick Ebersol, who took over NBC Sports in 1989, decided to make the Olympics a staple of his network's sports television schedule. NBC continued its Summer Games coverage into the decade, with both the 1992 Summer Olympics in Barcelona and the 1996 Summer Olympics in Atlanta. Previously hosting late night coverage in Seoul, Bob Costas made his debut as primetime host in Barcelona. It is a role that he held through the 2016 Summer Olympics in Rio de Janeiro.

===== 1992 Olympics Triplecast =====
NBC's 1992 bid cost $401 million thinking that the rival networks would bid at least $400 million. In order to defray costs of airing the games, the network teamed up with Cablevision for the Triplecast. The service consisted of red, white, and blue channels that allowed the viewer to watch anything they wanted even before it aired in the network's primetime telecast. However, the service was a dismal failure losing $100 million and had only 200,000 subscribers. In addition, the main network's coverage was cannibalized to the extent it seemed that the main coverage was overproduced and that viewers knew some results about 10 hours before they were aired over the air on NBC. For Atlanta, NBC had no supplemental cable coverage.

===== 1996 Olympic Park bombing =====
And as with Arledge in Munich, Ebersol had to deal with breaking news during the Atlanta Games. During the Centennial Olympic Park bombing in 1996, NBC suspended its coverage of a volleyball game and broadcast the news for several hours commercial-free. Like ABC's 1972 Munich coverage, the main primetime host didn't cover the bombing. That role went to both Hannah Storm and Jim Lampley for the first half-hour before turning coverage over to NBC Nightly News host Tom Brokaw. Toward the end of the second hour of coverage, NBC had an exclusive as Atlanta TV affiliate WXIA was in the process of interviewing Janet Evans during the bombing.

==== CBS ====
As for the Winter Games, CBS had a similar sweep of coverage in the U.S. during the decade; it showed all three contests (1992, 1994, and 1998). The 1994 Games saw the nights with the highest ratings in the history of American Olympic telecasts, as a result of the scandal in which associates of Tonya Harding attacked Nancy Kerrigan and the media frenzy that followed, as well as Dan Jansen's speed skating gold medal win. The short program on February 23 is, as of 2008, the sixth-highest rated primetime TV program in American history. It had a rating of 48.5 and a share of 64. The long program two days later had a rating of 44.1 and another 64 share; it ranks 32nd. Each telecast had a different primetime host(s): Paula Zahn and Tim McCarver cohosted in 1992, Greg Gumbel in 1994, and Jim Nantz in 1998.

As with NBC, CBS decided that it needed help to defray the increasing costs of broadcast rights. CBS's Winter Games coverage was shared with TNT, which aired events under the promotional slogan "The ultimate daytime drama." Nick Charles and Fred Hickman hosted the coverage from Turner's Atlanta studios in 1992 and 1994, while Jim Lampley was the host in 1998. While CBS had the top choice of events and had their own feed, TNT had to do with the world feed and aired their own events which was some sports CBS would not touch including curling in 1998.

===== The Late Show with David Letterman =====
Also supplementing CBS's coverage was David Letterman as his show was Olympic-themed in both 1994 and 1998 while the network aired the Olympics. A centerpiece of that coverage was nightly segments with his mother Dorothy, who was on-site at both the Lillehammer and Nagano Olympics.

=== 2000s ===
Coverage in the first decade of the 21st century revolved around two major storylines:

- NBC became the sole U.S. rights holder for the Olympic Games for the entire decade and beyond. The network boasted of being "America's Olympic Network" as it made the longest and most expensive commitment ever since the Olympics were first presented on TV. For the 1996 Summer Games, and all Games from 2000 to 2008, NBC paid a total of $3.5 billion, mostly to the International Olympic Committee but also to the USOC and local organizers. To extend rights to the 2010 Winter Olympics and 2012 Summer Olympics, NBC then gave up another $2.2 billion.
- The rise of various media platforms extended the reach and availability of Games coverage. NBC returned to supplemental cable/satellite coverage in 2000, with some events on CNBC and MSNBC. In 2004, it added USA Network, Bravo, and Telemundo, all of which parent company NBC Universal had acquired earlier in the decade. Finally, in 2008, events were streamed live for the first time on the Internet through the website NBCOlympics.com. (Also in 2008, Oxygen replaced Bravo as a supplemental network, and NBC launched high-definition channels dedicated to the basketball and soccer competitions.)

As was the case with Seoul in 1988, NBC convinced the organizers of the 2008 Beijing Summer Olympics to stage many of their major events during the late morning and early afternoon hours, which translated to live coverage during prime time in the United States.

=== 2010s ===
NBC's broadcasts of the 2010 Winter Olympics resulted in a loss of $233 million, due to the belief that it had overbid for the rights to the 2010 and 2012 Olympics, and an advertising market still recovering from the Great Recession (which had especially impacted automakers, a major market segment for Olympic advertisers). NBC's coverage also came amid continued criticism of its broadcast delay practices for the west coast (which persisted even though the Games were being hosted on the North American west coast).

In 2011, Comcast completed its acquisition of a majority stake in NBC Universal (now NBCUniversal). That June, the IOC held a sealed-bid auction on the rights to the 2014 Winter Olympics and 2016 Summer Olympics. Amid competing bids by Fox Sports and ABC/ESPN Inc., NBC renewed its rights to the Olympics across all platforms through 2020 in a deal worth $4.38 billion—the most expensive contract for Olympic media rights to-date. In May 2014, NBCUniversal extended its rights through 2032, paying $7.75 billion.

=== 2020s ===
In 2025, NBCUniversial renewed its rights to the Olympics through 2036, under an agreement valued at $3 billion.

In 2026, NBCUniversal spun off its cable operations, which includes USA Network, MS NOW (formerly MSNBC), CNBC, E!, Syfy, and Oxygen, into a new company called Versant. Under an agreement made with both NBCUniversal and Versant, coverage would continue to appear on CNBC and USA Network.

== Broadcasts Summary ==
=== Summer Olympic Games ===
| Year | Broadcaster | Host | Hours of Coverage | Opening ceremonies viewership (Note: Ratings for 1960–1976 games are listed in households (the percentage of households watching the program), while ratings for 1980 Winter games onwards are listed in viewers.) | Closing ceremonies viewership | Rights Fee |
|---|---|---|---|---|---|---|
| 1960 (Italy) | CBS | Rome, Italy | 20 | 18.1 | | $394,000 |
| 1964 (Japan) | NBC | Tokyo, Japan | 15 | 5.6 | | $1.5m |
| 1968 (Mexico) | ABC | Mexico City, Mexico | 43.75 | 8.8 | | $4.5m |
| 1972 (Germany) | ABC | Munich, Germany | 62.75 | 6.5 | 22.3 | $7.5m |
| 1976 (Canada) | ABC | Montreal, Canada | 76.5 | 13.9m | 19.4 | $25m |
| 1984 (United States) | ABC | Los Angeles, United States | 180 | | | $225m |
| 1988 (South Korea) | NBC | Seoul, South Korea | 179.5 | 22.68m | 18.28m | $300m |
| 1992 (Spain) | NBC | Barcelona, Spain | 161 + 1080 on Triplecast | 21.61m | 21.37m | $401m |
| 1996 (United States) | NBC | Atlanta, United States | 171 | 39.77m | 34.11m | $456m |
| 2000 (Australia) | NBC | Sydney, Australia | 441.5 | 27.27m | 16.71m | $705m |
| 2004 (Greece) | NBC | Athens, Greece | 1210 | 25.38m | 19.56m | $793m |
| 2008 (China) | NBC | Beijing, China | 3600 | 34.89m | 27.83m | $894m |
| 2012 (United Kingdom) | NBC | London, United Kingdom | 5535 | 40.65m | 31.0m | $1.18b |
| 2016 (Brazil) | NBC | Rio de Janeiro, Brazil | 6755 | 26.49m | 17.03m | $1.226b |
| 2020 (Japan) | NBC | Tokyo, Japan | 7000 | 16.70m | 8.81m | TBA |
| 2024 (France) | NBC | Paris, France | 7000 | 28.6m | 20.8m | TBA |
| 2028 (United States) | NBC + USA | Los Angeles, United States | TBD | | | |
| 2032 (Australia) | NBC + USA | Brisbane, Australia | TBD | | | |

=== Winter Olympic Games ===
| Year | Broadcaster | Host | Hours of Coverage | Opening ceremonies viewership | Closing ceremonies viewership | Rights Fee |
|---|---|---|---|---|---|---|
| 1960 (United States) | CBS | Squaw Valley, United States | 15 | 24.2 | | $50,000 |
| 1964 (Austria) | ABC | Innsbruck, Austria | 17.5 | 12.3 | | $597,000 |
| 1968 (France) | ABC | Grenoble, France | 27 | 2.9 | | $2.5m |
| 1972 (Japan) | NBC | Sapporo, Japan | 37 | 19.1 | 13.0 | $6.4m |
| 1976 (Austria) | ABC | Innsbruck, Austria | 43.5 | 23.2 | 18.6 | $10m |
| 1980 (United States) | ABC | Lake Placid, United States | 53.25 | 30.31m | 31.17m | $15.5m |
| 1984 (Socialist Federal Republic of Yugoslavia) | ABC | Sarajevo, Yugoslavia | 63 | 22.72m | 29.28m | $91.5m |
| 1988 (Canada) | ABC | Calgary, Canada | 94.5 | 32.37m | 27.54m | $309m |
| 1992 (France) | CBS + TNT | Albertville, France | 116 | 24m | 19.96m | $243m |
| 1994 (Norway) | CBS + TNT | Lillehammer, Norway | 119.5 | 33.84m | 34.50m | $300m |
| 1998 (Japan) | CBS + TNT | Nagano, Japan | 123.8 | 27.19m | 18.42m | $375m |
| 2002 (United States) | NBC | Salt Lake City, United States | 375.5 | 45.56m | 38.74m | $545m |
| 2006 (Italy) | NBC | Torino, Italy | 416 | 22.17m | 14.84m | $613m |
| 2010 (Canada) | NBC | Vancouver, Canada | 835 | 32.64m | 21.40m | $820m |
| 2014 (Russia) | NBC | Sochi, Russia | 1539 | 31.69m | 15.12m | $775m |
| 2018 (South Korea) | NBC | Pyeongchang, South Korea | 2400 | 27.84m | 14.78m | $963m |
| 2022 (China) | NBC | Beijing, China | 2800 | 10.76m | 6.57m | TBA |
| 2026 (Italy) | NBC + USA | Milan, Italy | TBD | | | |
| 2030 (France) | NBC + USA | French Alps, France | TBD | | | |

== Criticisms ==
Perhaps the most often heard criticism that some events are shown on disk- or tape delay rather than live. Even if sports are shown live to some parts of the country, it may remain delayed in others, especially in the Pacific Time Zone. NBC has explained that primetime coverage of select events, regardless of when they actually occur, is designed to maximize the total viewing audience.

Some examples of broadcast delay include:

- The 1980 Miracle on Ice, which ABC showed in primetime, about three hours after it actually took place. (The Americans' gold medal–clinching game against Finland was aired live, despite a start time of 11am EST on a Sunday morning. All US hockey games in the Winter Olympics since 1988 have been shown live, and since 1992, in full.)
- The relay race in 1984 in which Carl Lewis won his fourth gold medal.
- In 1996, much of the artistic gymnastics competition at the Atlanta Olympics was held in the afternoon, and was shown by NBC three to four hours after the competition ended.
- Nearly the entire 2000 schedule from Sydney, Australia, in some cases by nearly a day. (The only live telecast was the men's basketball final, which was shown live only after fans objected to the delayed coverage of earlier games.)
- For Pacific and Mountain Time Zone viewers, most of the 2010 Winter Olympics coverage was on delay, despite that the games were held in the Pacific Time Zone. As a result, viewers in Bellingham, Washington could not watch NBC's live coverage as it aired on the east coast despite the fact that they are just over 50 miles away from Vancouver.
  - Also, viewers in most of the Mountain time zone and all of the Pacific time zone could not watch live prime-time coverage of the 2002 Winter Olympics despite the fact many of the prime-time events took place around the Salt Lake City, Utah area. However, KSL-TV was allowed to air NBC's prime-time coverage live.
- The opening ceremony for the 2012 London Games, which NBC refused to air (or even stream on the internet) live, choosing instead to tape delay it and show in prime time for US audiences.

The broadcast delay practice even for major events has become increasingly frustrating with viewers in recent times due to the increased usage of social networking and Web sites (including the official Olympic site and NBC's Olympic website) posting results in real time. As a result, these practices has spawned outrage across the internet and even raising concerns from politicians.

On a related note, networks not part of the Olympic coverage, even including NBC News, are given very restrictive policies on showing highlights. For example, ESPN can show only a total of eight minutes of highlights per day, and must essentially wait until the next day to show any of it. (Reportedly, the only reason it can even show highlights at all is the unusual deal that sent Al Michaels to NBC Sunday Night Football in 2006, and returned the rights of Walt Disney's Oswald the Lucky Rabbit from Universal Studios to The Walt Disney Company.)

While every respective country's broadcast is biased towards the home athletes to a certain extent, NBC has faced scrutiny for allegedly focusing more on American athletes and less on other athletes from other countries, especially during the network's tape-delayed primetime coverage. This has proven to be unfounded and indeed NBC has been considered more inclusive of other countries' athletes than other countries' Olympic broadcasters. NBC's focus on U.S. athletes has been the subject of a series of studies that have shown NBC places a heavier emphasis on U.S. athletes during the Summer Games than during the Winter Games. When the NBC 2014 primetime Olympic broadcast was compared to those broadcast in Canada by the CBC, it was determined that CBC placed more emphasis, by a statistically significant margin, on Canadian athletes than NBC placed on U.S. athletes. Furthermore, such countries as Russia (broadcasters Channel One and Match TV), focus solely on their own athletes, ignoring events where they do not participate. By contrast, NBC often devotes considerable coverage to favorite foreigners such as Usain Bolt.

Unequal representation of genders has also been a criticism the coverage of the Olympics has faced. From 1992–1998, men received over 56 percent more coverage than women. The situation improved over time, with NBC Olympics introducing programs dedicated exclusively to women's sports.

== See also ==
- Olympics on television
- Olympics on ABC
- Olympics on CBS
- Olympics on NBC
- Olympics on TNT
