= Olympics on NBC =

American sports television broadcasts

NBC Olympics
- Genre: Olympics telecasts
- Country of origin: United States
- Original language: English
- No. of seasons: 14

Production
- Production locations: Various Olympic venues (event telecasts and studio segments)
- Camera setup: Multi-camera
- Running time: Varies
- Production companies: NBC Olympics, LLC (NBC Sports Group)

Original release
- Network: Comcast; NBC; NBCSN; Bravo; NBC Sports Regional Networks; NBC Sports; Peacock; Universo; Telemundo; Telemundo Deportes; Versant; USA; CNBC; MS NOW; E! Golf Channel; Syfy; Oxygen; Olympic Channel
- Release: October 10 – October 24, 1964
- Release: February 3 – February 13, 1972
- Release: September 17, 1988 – present

NBC Olympics is the commercial name for the NBC Sports-produced broadcasts of the Summer and Winter Olympic Games as shown in the United States on NBCUniversal and Versant platforms. They include the NBC broadcast network and as well as the cable networks operated by Versant under an agreement with NBC Universal; Spanish language network Telemundo; and streaming on the NBC Sports app, NBCOlympics.com, and Peacock. The event telecasts during the Olympics have aired primarily in the evening and on weekend afternoons on NBC, and varying times on its cable networks (such as after the close of the stock market day on CNBC, the early mornings on MS NOW, overnights on the USA Network, and various hours on NBCSN). Additional live coverage is available on the aforementioned streaming platforms.

The on-air title of the telecasts, as typically announced at the start of each broadcast and during sponsor billboards is always the official name of the games in question – for example, The Games of the XXIX Olympiad for the 2008 Summer Games. However, promotional logos may reflect the more common location-and-year name format, such as "Beijing 2008".

NBC has held the American broadcasting rights to the Summer Olympic Games since the 1988 games and the rights to the Winter Olympic Games since the 2002 games. In 2011, NBC agreed to a $4.38 billion contract with the International Olympic Committee to broadcast the Olympics through the 2020 games, the most expensive television rights deal in Olympic history. NBC then agreed to a $7.75 billion contract extension on May 7, 2014, to air the Olympics through the 2032 games. NBC also acquired the American television rights to the Youth Olympic Games, beginning in 2014, and the Paralympic Games for the 2014, 2016, 2018, and 2020 editions. NBC announced more than 1,200 hours of coverage for the 2020 games, called "unprecedented" by the International Paralympic Committee (IPC). In March 2025, NBC signed a $3 billion extension for both the 2034 Winter and 2036 Summer games. NBC is one of the major sources of revenue for the International Olympic Committee (IOC).

NBC's telecasts of the Olympics have been criticized for the tape delaying of events, spoiling the results of events prior to their own tape-delayed broadcast of those events, editing of its broadcasts to resemble an emotionally appealing program meant to entertain rather than a straight live sports event, and avoiding controversial subjects such as material critical of Russia at the 2014 Olympics. Since the 2012 Summer Olympics, live events have been continually added to NBC's cable networks and streaming platforms, rivaling the edited, tape-delayed broadcasts that traditionally air on the NBC broadcast network's primetime coverage.

== History ==
=== 1964 Summer ===
NBC televised its first Olympic Games in 1964, when it broadcast that year's Summer Olympics from Tokyo. NBC originally had intended to film the events from Tokyo but the Syncom team had a 1-hour test on the Syncom 3 satellite and it was discovered that it can transmit up to two hours from the United States to Japan as with signals from the West Coast. NBC needed approval from the FCC. It approved, thus giving NBC satellite coverage of the Olympics, allowing NBC to avoid flight expenses and having to fly as many tapes. NBC's telecast of the opening ceremonies that year marked the first color broadcast televised live via satellite back to the United States.

The Olympic competition itself was broadcast in black-and-white. Through its use of the Syncom 3 satellite, a daily highlights package could be seen a few hours after the events took place; otherwise, videotape canisters were flown across the Pacific Ocean and were broadcast to American viewers the following day.

Serving as anchor was Bill Henry, then NBC News Tokyo bureau chief, who had extensive experience in both print and broadcast news. Play-by-play commentators included Bud Palmer and Jim Simpson, while former Olympians Rafer Johnson and Murray Rose served as analysts.

=== 1972 Winter ===
NBC first televised the Winter Olympic Games in 1972. Anchored by Curt Gowdy, much of the coverage actually was broadcast live since alpine skiing and long track speed skating were held in the morning, which corresponded to prime time on the East Coast of the United States. Although NBC bought the television rights from the Sapporo Olympics group, they didn't know that they had to make a deal with NHK for broadcast booths at each venue. By the time NBC found out, it was too late. The booths had been built and there were none to spare. Consequently, everyone worked off monitors.

A young sportscaster making his network television debut at Sapporo was a 26-year-old Al Michaels, who did hockey play-by-play during the games. Eight years later, he would call the famous 1980 "Miracle On Ice" at that year's Winter Games in Lake Placid for ABC Sports. Other sportscasters utilized by NBC included Jim Simpson, Jay Randolph, Billy Kidd, Peggy Fleming, Art Devlin, and Terry McDermott.

=== 1980 boycott ===
NBC had won the U.S. broadcast rights for the 1980 Summer Olympics in Moscow, Russia, but when the United States Olympic Committee kept U.S. athletes home to honor the boycott announced by President Jimmy Carter in protest of the Soviet invasion of Afghanistan, the telecasts were greatly scaled back. In the end, what had been 150 hours of scheduled coverage, had substantially decreased to just a few hours. Highlights were fed to local NBC stations for use on their local newscasts. Many affiliates, however, refused to show the Olympic highlights on their local news or clear airtime for the few hours of coverage NBC did present.

NBC's extensive coverage was canceled before a prime time anchor had been named; it was said that NBC Nightly News anchor John Chancellor (who formerly served as a Moscow bureau chief for NBC News), along with sportscasters Bryant Gumbel and Dick Enberg, were reportedly being considered for the prime time studio host role. Bryant Gumbel ultimately served as Seoul primetime host in 1988 while Dick Enberg co-hosted the ceremonies through the 1996 closing.

NBC Sports executive Don Ohlmeyer had originally commissioned to use "1980", an instrumental theme written by Herb Alpert, for NBC's planned coverage of the Summer Olympics in Moscow. It would ultimately be used seven years later as the official theme song for NBC's telecast of the 1986 FIFA World Cup in Mexico.

=== 1988 Summer ===
NBC then bid for, and won, the rights to televise the 1988 Summer Olympics. Due to American television companies providing most of the revenue for the organizers, they agreed to schedule most of the team finals in the afternoon, which corresponded to prime time of the previous night in the United States (due to both South Korea being located near the western border of the International Date Line, in addition to the differences in time zones).

Today co-anchor Bryant Gumbel was the prime time host that year; Bob Costas hosted the late-night telecasts while Jane Pauley was one of the hosts of early-morning coverage. Gumbel and Dick Enberg were co-hosts for the opening and closing ceremonies.

Michael Weisman led a team covering the 1988 Summer Olympics for the network. One of those employees was future NBC Entertainment and CNN President Jeff Zucker, who Weisman hired as a researcher. Weisman considered producing the Olympics a challenge, saying, "my mandate is to shatter the mystique that only ABC can do the Olympics." Weisman assembled the "Seoul Searchers," a group of specialized sports reporters tasked with following breaking news during the Games. Some criticized the journalistic focus to the games. Weisman, however, defended the tone, saying "the criticism we hear is that people want to hear positive news . . . we are not the American team. We are clearly rooting for the American team, but we're not going to whitewash anything." Other ideas Weisman introduced for the Olympics included miniature "point of view cameras" for specific events such as the pole vault and gymnastics; the "Olympic Chronicles," profiles which highlighted athletes and moments from Olympics past; and an Olympic soundtrack which included an original Whitney Houston song, "One Moment in Time". NBC won seven Emmy Awards for their Olympic coverage.

A curious result was that, since in the United States, the 1988 NFL season had just started, NBC would plug the holes (primarily play-by-play broadcasters) with well-known older broadcasters such as Curt Gowdy, Ray Scott and Merle Harmon, among others. Marv Albert was calling boxing during the Olympics alongside Ferdie Pacheco. Meanwhile, Don Criqui and Bob Trumpy called swimming (alongside Candy Costie-Burke for the synchronized events and John Naber) and volleyball (alongside Chris Marlowe) respectively. Charlie Jones called track and field (alongside Frank Shorter and Dwight Stones) and Jimmy Cefalo served as the daytime host. Bob Costas (as previously mentioned) and Gayle Gardner were NBC's late night hosts. Dick Enberg served as host for the opening and closing ceremonies and called men's basketball (alongside Al McGuire) and gymnastics (alongside Mary Lou Retton and Bart Conner). Jay Randolph called baseball during the Olympics alongside Jim Kaat.

=== 1992 Summer ===
Just as his mentor Roone Arledge had before over at ABC, Dick Ebersol, who took over NBC Sports in 1989, decided to make the Olympics a staple of NBC's sports television schedule. NBC continued its Summer Games coverage into the next decade, with both the 1992 Summer Olympics in Barcelona and the 1996 Summer Olympics. For the 1992 games, Ebersol surprised even his own staff as well as everybody else by paying a then record $401 million for the 1992 games. NBC then paid $456 million to broadcast the 1996 Olympics. Previously hosting late night coverage in Seoul, Bob Costas made his debut, as primetime host, in Barcelona. It is a role that he held through the Rio 2016 Summer Olympics.

Among the sportscasters that NBC utilized in 1992 were Marv Albert, Mike Fratello, and Quinn Buckner on basketball, Bob Trumpy, Al Bernstein, and Beasley Reece on boxing, Tom Hammond, Charlie Jones Michele Mitchell, and Wendy Lian Williams on diving, Terry Leibel and Melanie Smith Taylor on equestrian, Jim Donovan and Seamus Malin on soccer, John Tesh, Greg Lewis, Tim Daggett, Elfi Schlegel, Wendy Hilliard, Peter Vidmar, and Julianne McNamara on gymnastics, Joel Meyers on rowing, Charlie Jones, Mary Wayte, and Mike O'Brien on swimming, Al Trautwig and Tracie Ruiz-Conforto on synchronized swimming, Bud Collins, Tracy Austin, Chris Evert, and Vitas Gerulaitis on tennis, Tom Hammond, Craig Masback, and Dwight Stones on track and field, Chris Marlowe and Paul Sunderland on volleyball, Charlie Jones and Jim Kruse on water polo, and Russ Hellickson and Jeff Blatnick on wrestling.

In order to defray costs of airing the games, the network teamed up with Cablevision for the Triplecast. The service consisted of red, white, and blue channels that allowed the viewer to watch anything they wanted even before it aired in the network's primetime telecast. However, the service was a dismal failure losing $100 million and had only 200,000 subscribers. In addition, the main network's coverage was cannibalized to the extent it seemed that the main coverage was overproduced and that viewers knew some results about 10 hours before they were aired over the air on NBC. For Atlanta, NBC had no supplemental cable coverage.

=== 1996 Summer ===
For the 1996 Summer Olympics in Atlanta, NBC used as commentators Marv Albert, Matt Goukas, Magic Johnson, and Jim Gray on men's basketball, Mike Breen and Cheryl Miller on women's basketball, Bob Papa, Al Bernstein, Beasley Reese on boxing, Charlie Jones and Bill Endicott on canoeing, Al Trautwig, Phil Liggett, and Paul Sherwen on cycling, Dan Hicks and Cynthia Potter on diving, Jim Simpson and Melanie Smith Taylor on equestrian, Jim Donovan and Seamus Malin on soccer, John Tesh, Tim Daggett, Elfi Schlegel, and Beth Ruyak on gymnastics, Charlie Jones and Bill Endicott on rowing, Dan Hicks, Summer Sanders, Rowdy Gaines, and Jim Gray on swimming, Don Criqui and Tracie Ruiz-Conforto on synchronized swimming, Bud Collins and Mary Carillo on tennis, Tom Hammond, Dwight Stones, Craig Masback, and Carol Lewis on track and field, Chris Marlowe, Randy Rosenbloom (beach), Paul Sunderland, Kirk Kilgour (beach), and Bill Walton on volleyball, Don Criqui and Jim Kruse on water polo, Bob Trumpy and Phil Simms on weightlifting, and Russ Hellickson and Jeff Blatnick on wrestling.

As with Arledge in Munich, Ebersol had to deal with breaking news during the Atlanta Games. During the Centennial Olympic Park bombing in 1996, NBC suspended its coverage of a volleyball game and broadcast the news for several hours commercial-free. Like ABC's 1972 Munich coverage, the main primetime host (in 1972's case, Chris Schenkel instead of Jim McKay) did not cover the bombing. That role went to both Hannah Storm and Jim Lampley for the first half-hour before turning coverage over to NBC Nightly News anchor Tom Brokaw. Toward the end of the second hour of coverage, NBC had an exclusive as the network's Atlanta affiliate, WXIA-TV, was in the process of interviewing Janet Evans during the bombing.

=== 2000 Summer ===
Beginning with the 2000 Summer Olympics, NBC became the sole U.S. rights holder for the Olympic Games for the entire decade. NBC made the longest and most expensive commitment ever anywhere in the world since the Olympics were first presented on television. For the 1996 Summer Olympics, and all Games from 2000 to 2008, NBC paid a total of $3.5 billion, mostly to the International Olympic Committee but also to the United States Olympic & Paralympic Committee and local organizers.

To help offset the increasing costs of broadcast rights, NBC turned to cable and satellite services to help provide additional coverage. Following the failure of the Triplecast pay-per-view experiment, NBC leaned on its growing slate of cable channels (particularly following then-parent General Electric's 2004 acquisition of Vivendi Universal to form NBC Universal) to provide supplementary coverage of Olympic events.

The rise of various media platforms extended the reach and availability of Olympic Games coverage. NBC returned to supplemental cable/satellite coverage in 2000, with some events airing on CNBC and MSNBC; traditionally CNBC has mainly aired coverage of boxing events.

=== 2002 Winter ===
The 2002 Winter Olympics were the first Winter Olympics under a multi-year rights agreement between NBC and the IOC.

NBC partnered with HDNet to produce an eight-hour block of daily coverage in high definition, which was carried by HDNet and on the digital signals of participating NBC affiliates. Despite being held in a time zone only one hour ahead of Pacific Time, NBC still tape delayed much of its coverage for the west coast, although Salt Lake City's local NBC affiliate KSL-TV was given permission to air the live, east coast broadcasts to ensure their availability in the Games' host city.

=== 2004 Summer ===
For the first time at the 2004 Summer Olympics, major broadcasters were allowed to serve video coverage of the Olympics over the Internet, provided that they restricted this service geographically, to protect broadcasting contracts in other areas. The International Olympic Committee forbade Olympic athletes, as well as coaches, support personnel and other officials, from setting up specialized weblogs and/or other websites for covering their personal perspective of the Games. They were not allowed to post audio, video, or photos that they had taken. An exception was made if an athlete already has a personal website that was not set up specifically for the Games. NBC launched its own Olympic website, NBCOlympics.com. Focusing on the television coverage of the Games, it did provide video clips, medal standings and live results. Its main purpose, however, was to provide a schedule of what sports were on the many stations of NBC Universal. The Games were shown on television 24 hours a day, on one network or another.

High-definition coverage began in 2004.

NBC added USA Network, Bravo and Telemundo, all of which parent company NBC Universal had acquired earlier in the decade.

Overall, NBC's coverage of the Olympics has been praised, and the company was awarded with 6 Emmy Awards for its coverage of the Games and technical production. Additionally, NBC televised all 28 sports in the 2004 Games, becoming the first broadcaster to do so.

=== 2006 Winter ===
During the 2006 Winter Olympics, USA Network aired a daily studio program focusing on the figure skating competitions, Olympic Ice, which was hosted by Mary Carillo and featured appearances by analysts such as Dick Button (who hosted the viewer e-mail segment "Push Dick's Button"), Jamie Sale and David Pelletier.

Universal HD was added to the list of channels carrying the Games.

Also during the 2006 games, most NBC affiliates introduced Olympic Zone, an access hour program leading into primetime coverage which airs Mondays through Saturdays during the games. Each edition is hosted locally and contains a mixture of network-produced and, if station resources allow, local segments (similar to the PM Magazine format). A version of the program had been piloted by KCRA Sacramento during the 2004 games.

=== 2008 Summer ===
At the 2008 Summer Olympics, events were streamed live for the first time on the Internet through the NBCOlympics.com website, and NBC began to employ part-time high-definition channels dedicated to the basketball and soccer competitions. Recent NBC Universal acquisition Oxygen joined NBC's coverage, carrying a two-hour block on weekdays with a focus on gymnastics (deemed by NBC executives to be an equivalent to Olympic Ice during the 2006 games).

=== 2010 Winter ===
Former NBC Olympics logo used from 2010 to 2022

In 2006, NBC paid another $2.2 billion to purchase the rights to the 2010 Winter Olympics and 2012 Summer Olympics but lost $223 million on the 2010 broadcasts. NBC Olympics is the International Olympic Committee's, and by extension the Olympic movement's, highest revenue stream.

The 2010 Games added then-digital multicast network Universal Sports, which carried analysis programs about events, while Oxygen and Bravo were completely excluded to maintain their schedules.

=== 2012 Summer ===
In 2011, Comcast acquired majority control of NBC's parent company NBC Universal from General Electric (whose remaining interest Comcast later acquired in 2013); on June 6, 2011, NBCUniversal announced that it had acquired the television rights for the 2014, 2016, 2018 and 2020 Olympics, beating out ESPN/ABC and Fox. The entire package was worth $4.38 billion, making it the most expensive television rights deal in Olympic history. NBC paid $775 million for the 2014 Winter Olympics in Sochi, Russia, and $1.23 billion for the 2016 Summer Olympics in Rio de Janeiro, Brazil. NBC also paid $963 million for the rights to the 2018 Winter Olympics (in Pyeongchang, South Korea) and $1.45 billion for the 2020 Summer Olympics (which were to be held in Tokyo, Japan but were later postponed to 2021 as a result of the COVID-19 pandemic).

In response to criticism it received during previous Olympics, NBC also announced that beginning in 2012, it planned to broadcast all events live through either television or digital platforms. Additionally, the NBC Sports Network (NBCSN; formerly Versus, which became a part of NBC Sports following the acquisition) also added coverage of the Olympics beginning with the 2012 London Games, with an emphasis on team sports, for the duration of the network's existence. NBCSN became the highlighted cable network for coverage, replacing both USA Network, which would maintain their regular entertainment schedule during the games. The 2012 Summer Olympics also saw Universal HD removed from the company's cable/satellite coverage. Bravo aired supplemental coverage (mainly the tennis tournament) in place of Oxygen, with Universal Sports again solely providing analysis and pay television providers again carrying dedicated HD basketball and soccer networks.

=== 2014 Winter ===
The 2014 Winter Olympics again saw NBCSN as the highlighted cable network, though NBCUniversal's cable networks had additional complications due to NBC's weekend coverage of the Premier League, which usually aired on NBCSN but was instead moved to USA Network due to the Olympics, and some coverage of the games usually seen on CNBC replaced with the first night of the Westminster Kennel Club Dog Show because of the yearly conflict with USA's WWE Monday Night Raw. A new online-network called Gold Zone, which featured rolling coverage of events in the style of NFL Network's NFL RedZone and ESPN Goal Line (and has been by coincidence hosted by Andrew Siciliano, who also hosted the NFL Sunday Ticket-exclusive version of RedZone for DirecTV), was also launched to provide coverage of the Games, which was retained for 2016's coverage.

=== 2016 Summer ===
For the 2016 Summer Olympics, NBC began to offer 4K content on a delayed basis through participating service providers (particularly DirecTV, Dish Network, and Xfinity), downconverted from 8K footage filmed by NHK and Olympic Broadcasting Services (OBS), with HDR and Dolby Atmos support. Eighty-six hours of event footage was offered. NBC affiliate WRAL-TV in Raleigh, North Carolina also carried this content via their experimental ATSC 3.0 digital signals.

With the re-introduction of golf to the Olympics, Golf Channel was added to NBC's coverage, with Golf Channel on NBC providing production resources for the two tournaments on behalf of OBS. The primetime block of NBC's coverage in 2016 also featured Descriptive Video Service through the SAP channel for the first time since the Federal Communications Commission (FCC) was allowed to require broadcasters to expand their production and access to described programming for the blind and visually impaired (though live sporting events were not required under the guidelines, so NBC's effort is entirely voluntary).

On July 15, 2017, Universal HD was relaunched as a localized version of Olympic Channel, airing coverage of Olympic sports outside of the Games.

=== 2018 Winter ===
In February 2017, Bob Costas stepped down as the main host of NBC's coverage, being replaced by former ESPN personality Mike Tirico.

On March 28, 2017, NBC announced that it would adopt a new format for its primetime coverage of the 2018 Winter Olympics, with a focus on live coverage in all time zones to take advantage of Pyeongchang's 14-hour difference with U.S. Eastern Time, and to address criticism of its previous tape delay practices. As before, the primetime block began at 8:00 p.m ET/5:00 p.m PT, and unlike previous Olympics, was available for streaming. Event sessions in figure skating were deliberately scheduled with morning sessions so that they could air during primetime in the Americas (and in turn, NBC's coverage; due to the substantial fees NBC has paid for rights to the Olympics, the IOC has allowed NBC to have influence on event scheduling to maximize U.S. television ratings when possible; NBC agreed to a $7.75 billion contract extension on May 7, 2014, to air the Olympics through the 2032 games, is also one of the major sources of revenue for the IOC).

Coverage took a break in the east for late local news, after which coverage continued into "Primetime Plus", which featured additional live coverage into the Eastern late night and Western primetime hours. This was then followed by an encore of the Primetime block. NBCSN also broadcast live primetime blocks, and revived Olympic Ice to serve as a pre-show for figure skating coverage (hosted by Liam McHugh and Tanith White from Pyeongchang), alongside a digital-exclusive post-show hosted by Krista Voda from NBC Sports' headquarters. On February 19, 2018, NBC began airing The Fallon Five—special five-minute episodes of The Tonight Show Starring Jimmy Fallon—as a segment during the primetime block for the remaining weekdays of the Games.

=== 2020 Summer ===
NBCUniversal integrated its Peacock streaming service into coverage beginning with the 2020 Summer Olympics. It carried a special "Tokyo Now" channel during the Games, featuring the studio programs Tokyo Live (event coverage and medal ceremonies), Tokyo Gold (an hour-long highlight show recapping the previous day's events), On Her Turf at the Olympics (a daily program focusing on news and highlights involving women at the Games), Tokyo Tonight (which featured whiparound coverage in primetime hosted by former ESPN personalities Kenny Mayne and Cari Champion), and Olympic Highlights with Snoop Dogg and Kevin Hart (a half-hour highlight show with an unconventional and comedic tone). Peacock also carried coverage of selected basketball, gymnastics, and track and field events. Not all Olympics coverage was available on Peacock, with the majority of digital coverage still requiring TV Everywhere credentials and not being available on a purely over-the-top basis. For the first time, Olympic Channel was incorporated into live event coverage, with a particular focus on the tennis and wrestling competitions.

Due to the COVID-19 pandemic (which had already prompted the Games to be postponed by one year to 2021) and biosecurity protocols, NBC sent a significantly smaller number of employees to Tokyo than it usually did for previous Summer Olympics. While commentators were present in Tokyo for flagship events such as athletics, the majority of commentators called events remotely from NBC Sports' headquarters in Stamford, Connecticut. Due to social distancing and remote production, NBC's staff was largely divided among the headquarters, other NBC facilities (such as 30 Rockefeller Plaza, and those of CNBC, Telemundo, and in some cases, Sky Sports in Great Britain), and a nearby hotel in Stamford, while makeshift commentary booths had to be constructed in storage areas of the Stamford building. Meanwhile in Tokyo, NBC used the Hilton Tokyo Odaiba hotel as a broadcast location, with Mike Tirico anchoring from an outdoor set on a balcony overlooking Tokyo Bay. Telemundo employed a virtual set at its headquarters in Miami, which was modeled after NBC's main indoor set in Tokyo.

=== 2022 Winter ===
The scheduling of the 2022 Winter Olympics impacted the U.S. broadcast rights to the Super Bowl, the championship game of the National Football League (NFL) and historically the most-watched television broadcast in the United States annually. The rights to the game rotate between CBS, Fox, and long-time Olympic broadcaster NBC; to prevent the Games from competing for viewership and advertising sales with Super Bowl LVI—which was scheduled for February 13, 2022, at Los Angeles' SoFi Stadium—CBS and NBC announced in March 2019 that they would swap the rights for Super Bowl LVI and LV (2021), so that both the 2022 Winter Olympics and Super Bowl LVI would be broadcast by NBC. In a break from the established practice of airing premieres or special episodes of television series after the Super Bowl to take advantage of its large audience, NBC aired its prime time coverage for Day 10 of the Games immediately following the game. Furthermore, the NFL's new media rights beginning in 2023 (which extends the Super Bowl rotation to four networks) codifies this scenario, with all of NBC's future Super Bowl games being in Winter Olympic years (2026, 2030, and 2034).

Due to COVID-19 protocol (including China's strict zero-COVID policy), NBC once again sent a smaller contingent of staff to Beijing, and all events were called remotely from its various facilities. Mike Tirico anchored the opening weekend of the Games (including the opening ceremony) from Beijing, but traveled back to the United States on February 8 for logistical reasons. After that night's coverage was guest hosted by Craig Melvin and Maria Taylor from Stamford, Tirico returned the following night. He then traveled to Los Angeles to host NBC's coverage of Super Bowl LVI, presenting prime time coverage over Super Bowl weekend from a set outside SoFi Stadium before returning to Stamford for the remainder of the Games.

For the first time, all events and NBC telecasts were streamed live and on-demand on Peacock for Premium subscribers.

=== 2024 Summer ===
NBC Paralympics logo

For the 2024 Summer Olympics in Paris, NBC maintained most of the format changes used in the three Asia-hosted Olympics, including live coverage on NBC during the U.S. daytime hours across the main network and NBCUniversal cable networks (including two part-time "Paris Extra" channels), and all events streaming on Peacock. Due to the Games being hosted in Europe, the primetime block—branded as Primetime in Paris—returned to a tape-delayed, news magazine-like format with a focus on highlights from the past day's events, and feature segments highlighting athletes and storylines throughout the Games. In addition to its facilities in Stamford (which largely maintained aspects of the remote production setups used for Tokyo and Beijing), NBC set up studios in the Musée de l'Homme for the primetime block and Today, and a set for the NBC Nightly News overlooking the Arc de Triomphe. USA Network would offer a temporary 4K feed throughout the Games through participating television providers, carrying 400 hours of coverage in 1080p with HDR (upconverted to 4K). NBC stations in 67 markets also carried the network's coverage in 1080p HDR via their ATSC 3.0 signals.

The Gold Zone whiparound show on Peacock returned in a revamped form, hosted by Scott Hanson, Andrew Siciliano, Matt Iseman and Akbar Gbajabiamila (of American Ninja Warrior), and Jac Collinsworth; notably, Hanson and Siciliano—who had hosted rival "red zone" channels from NFL Network and NFL Sunday Ticket on DirecTV respectively—would co-host a block of Gold Zone together. NBC offered several digital features using generative AI, including "OLI"—a chatbot providing information on the Games' broadcast schedule, and "Your Daily Olympic Recap" on Peacock—a personalized recap of events narrated by an AI-synthesized likeness of Al Michaels.

Snoop Dogg would return as a celebrity correspondent for the primetime block, along with Saturday Night Live cast member Colin Jost—who was stationed in Tahiti as a special correspondent for surfing. However, after suffering multiple injuries and ailments (including a staph infection, ear infection, and cutting his foot on a coral reef), he dropped out part-way through the Games during a break in the schedule, and was replaced by Luke Bradnam—a weatherman from the Nine Network in Australia. During the final day of coverage, Tirico was joined for a segment by Bob Costas (marking his first appearance on NBC's coverage since 2016) and Al Michaels, who discussed notable moments from previous Olympics hosted by the United States as a prelude to the 2028 Summer Olympics in Los Angeles.

For the 2024 Summer Paralympics, 140 hours of linear coverage was carried by NBC, USA Network, and CNBC, while Peacock streamed all events. NBC had hosts on-site for the first time, with Andrea Joyce and Lacey Henderson serving as hosts from Paris. Sophie Morgan (who hosted the 2020 Paralympics for Channel 4 in the United Kingdom), Carolyn Manno, and Chris Waddell hosted from Stamford. Peacock features such as multi-view and Gold Zone (hosted by Manno) were also used during the Paralympics for the first time.

=== 2026 Winter ===
The 2026 Winter Olympics (promoted by NBC as Milan Cortina 2026) featured over 3,200 hours of coverage across NBC Sports and Versant properties, 2,500 hours of which were carried by Peacock. Features from the 2024 Summer Olympics were maintained, including the primetime format (now branded as Primetime in Milan), OLI, the Gold Zone, and multi-views. Peacock also offered extended figure skating and hockey coverage under the banner "Rinkside Live", including behind-the-scenes camera feeds and a vertical video "highlights hub". In 2026, NBCUniversal spun off most of its cable operations, including USA Network, CNBC, and E! among others, into a new company called Versant; as part of the spin-off, NBC sublicensed cable television coverage of the Olympics to CNBC and USA Network. NBC's weekend coverage was interspersed with coverage of Super Bowl LX, as well as the 2026 NBA All-Star Weekend. NBC then followed its live broadcast of the closing ceremony with a Sunday Night Basketball game.

Mike Tirico did not participate in the opening Friday and Saturday of the Games due to his commitments to serving as play-by-play commentator for Super Bowl LX. Maria Taylor filled in for as a co-host for the opening ceremonies and as host of the primetime show on February 7 when Tirico began hosting the remainder of the Games from Santa Clara on February 8 and from Milan beginning February 9. In turn, Noah Eagle and Ahmed Fareed filled in for Tirico and Taylor as play-by-play announcer and studio host respectively on the NBA on NBC during the Games. Today presenter Savannah Guthrie was to have co-hosted the opening ceremonies, but withdrew after the disappearance of her mother Nancy just days prior. Veteran sportscaster Mary Carillo was named co-host in Guthrie's absence.

Milano Cortina 2026 was NBC's most-watched Winter Olympics since 2014, with the network reporting a 96% increase over 2022, and approximately 215 million viewers across sports telecasts it cross-promoted under the "Legendary February" branding (including the Olympics, Super Bowl LX, and NBA). With a scheduling window placing it in the morning hours in North America, the men's hockey gold medal game was seen by an average of 18.6 million viewers and peaked at 26 million during the overtime period, ranking behind only the 2010 gold medal game as NBC's second highest-rated hockey telecast of all-time, and as the highest-rated U.S. sports broadcast to begin before 9:00 a.m. ET. NBC aired the game with limited commercial interruptions, with no breaks outside of intermissions.

=== Future ===
On March 13, 2025, NBCUniversal announced that it had reached a four-year extension of its rights to the Olympic Games, valued at $3 billion, to extend them through the 2034 Winter Olympics in Utah, and the 2036 Summer Olympics. The agreement also includes commitments for NBCUniversal and parent company Comcast to collaborate with the IOC and OBS to leverage its "expertise in technology infrastructure, connectivity and media to support the delivery of the Olympic Games".

== Hours of coverage ==
=== Winter Olympic Games ===
Year	Host	Hours of coverage	Network(s)
1972	Sapporo, Japan	37	NBC
2002	Salt Lake City, United States	375.5	NBC, CNBC, MSNBC
2006	Torino, Italy	416	NBC, CNBC, MSNBC, USA Network, Universal HD, Telemundo
2010	Vancouver, Canada	835	NBC, CNBC, MSNBC, USA Network, Universal HD, Telemundo
2014	Sochi, Russia	1,539	NBC, CNBC, MSNBC, NBCSN, USA Network, Telemundo, NBCOlympics.com
2018	Pyeongchang, South Korea	2,400	NBC, CNBC, MSNBC, NBCSN, USA Network, Olympic Channel, Telemundo, NBCOlympics.com
2022	Beijing, China	2,800	NBC, Peacock, CNBC, USA Network, NBCOlympics.com, NBC Sports App
2026	Milan-Cortina, Italy	3,200	NBC, Peacock, CNBC, NBCSN, USA Network, NBCOlympics.com, NBC Sports App, iHeartRadio (live on app, updates on AM and FM stations)
2030	French Alps, France	TBA	TBA
2034	Salt Lake City, United States	TBA	TBA

=== Summer Olympic Games ===
Year	Host	Hours of coverage	Network(s)
1964	Tokyo, Japan	15 hours overall	NBC
1980	Moscow, Soviet Union	primarily highlights (6 hours of highlights)	NBC
1988	Seoul, South Korea	179.5	NBC
1992	Barcelona, Spain	161 + 1,080 on Triplecast	NBC, Olympics Triplecast
1996	Atlanta, United States	171	NBC
2000	Sydney, Australia	441.5	NBC, CNBC, MSNBC, PAX
2004	Athens, Greece	1,210	NBC, CNBC, MSNBC, USA Network, Bravo, Telemundo
2008	Beijing, China	3,600	NBC, CNBC, MSNBC, USA Network, Universal HD, Oxygen, Telemundo, NBC Olympics Basketball Channel, NBC Olympics Soccer Channel
2012	London, United Kingdom	5,535	NBC, CNBC, MSNBC, Bravo, NBC Sports Network, Telemundo, NBC Olympics Basketball Channel, NBC Olympics Soccer Channel, NBCOlympics.com
2016	Rio de Janeiro, Brazil	6,755	NBC, CNBC, MSNBC, Bravo, Golf Channel, NBCSN, Telemundo, NBC Universo, NBC Olympics Basketball Channel, NBC Olympics Soccer Channel, NBCOlympics.com
2020	Tokyo, Japan	7,000	NBC, Peacock, CNBC, USA Network, NBCSN, Golf Channel, Olympic Channel, Telemundo, Universo, NBCOlympics.com, NBC Sports App
2024	Paris, France	7,000+	NBC, Peacock, CNBC, USA Network, E!, Golf Channel, Telemundo, Universo, NBCOlympics.com, NBC Sports App, iHeartRadio (live on app, updates on AM and FM stations)
2028	Los Angeles, United States	TBA	TBA
2032	Brisbane, Australia	TBA	TBA
2036	TBA	TBA	TBA

Traditionally, NBC has primarily televised marquee sports in its Olympic coverage. When the network added coverage on its cable partners in 2000, it opened space to televise other sports. The 2004 Summer Games marked the first year that the network televised all 28 sports. Since 2008, aided with online streaming, NBC has aired many of the events held at the Summer Games live.

== Hosts ==
=== Winter Olympic Games ===
Year	Prime-time host	Daytime host(s)	Late-night host(s)
1972	Curt Gowdy		
2002	Bob Costas	Hannah Storm	Dan Hicks
2006	Bob Costas	Jim Lampley	Jim Lampley
2010	Bob Costas	Al Michaels	Mary Carillo
2014	Bob Costas, Matt Lauer, & Meredith Vieira	Rebecca Lowe, Al Michaels & Dan Patrick	Bob Costas, Matt Lauer, & Meredith Vieira
2018	Mike Tirico	Rebecca Lowe	Mike Tirico
2022	Mike Tirico & Craig Melvin	Rebecca Lowe	Maria Taylor
2026	Mike Tirico, Maria Taylor, & Mary Carillo (Note: Carillo was named to replace Savannah Guthrie as a co-host due to Guthrie stepping aside following the disappearance of her mother Nancy.)	Rebecca Lowe	Maria Taylor & Ahmed Fareed

=== Summer Olympic Games ===
Year	Prime-time host	Daytime host(s)	Late-night host(s)
1964	Bill Henry		
1988	Bryant Gumbel	Jane Pauley, Gayle Gardner & Jimmy Cefalo	Bob Costas
1992	Bob Costas	Dick Enberg & Katie Couric	Jim Lampley & Hannah Storm
1996	Bob Costas	Greg Gumbel, Jim Lampley, Hannah Storm, Ahmad Rashad, Dick Enberg & Katie Couric	Greg Gumbel, Jim Lampley, Hannah Storm, Ahmad Rashad, Dick Enberg & Katie Couric
2000	Bob Costas	Hannah Storm	Bob Costas
2004	Bob Costas	Jim Lampley	Pat O'Brien & Dan Hicks
2008	Bob Costas	Jim Lampley	Mary Carillo
2012	Bob Costas	Al Michaels & Dan Patrick	Mary Carillo
2016	Bob Costas	Rebecca Lowe, Al Michaels, Dan Patrick & Mike Tirico	Ryan Seacrest
2020	Mike Tirico	Rebecca Lowe	Mike Tirico & Maria Taylor
2024	Mike Tirico	Rebecca Lowe, Craig Melvin, Ahmed Fareed, Mike Tirico, & Damon Hack	Maria Taylor

== Music ==
Since 1992, the main theme of NBC's Olympics coverage has been "Bugler's Dream", a composition by Leo Arnaud that was previously used by ABC as the main theme of its Olympics coverage since 1964. Since the 1996 Summer Olympics, this theme has been played in a medley with John Williams' "Olympic Fanfare and Theme", which was originally composed for the 1984 Summer Olympics in Los Angeles. Williams has composed other secondary themes for the Olympics and NBC's telecasts, including "The Olympic Spirit" (which was used as the main theme in 1988, NBC's first year as rightsholder, before "Bugler's Dream" was reinstated the following Olympiad), "Summon the Heroes" (a piece written for the opening ceremony in 1996), and "Call of the Champions" (which was written for the 2002 Winter Olympics).

In 1996, NBC began using the Randy Edelman-composed theme song from the short-lived Fox series The Adventures of Brisco County, Jr. during a segment highlighting upcoming Olympic events. NBC had commissioned Edelman to compose theme music for its National Football League coverage (stemming from its prior use of a portion of his score from Gettysburg for its coverage of the Breeder's Cup), and the theme was included in a portfolio of work Edelman had sent the network. Edelman felt that the track "seemed to have the right spirit. It's got a very flowing melody, it's triumphant, and it has a certain warmth. And it has at the end of it, what all television things like this have, a 'button,' an ending flourish that works really well if they need to chop it down into a 15-second thing." Senior creative producer Mark Levy felt that the works that Edelman had scored, as with John Williams, shared the "proportion and emotion" of the Olympics.

Since 2002, NBC had used music from the soundtrack of the sports film Remember the Titans as part of its closing credits sequence for the Olympics

Yanni's "In Celebration of Man", a piece that CBS had declined an offer to use at the 1992 Winter Olympics, was used during a preview special for the 1992 Summer Olympics; NBC's Olympics producer at the time was friends with the musician. Although NBC did not use it during the Games, the song later became theme music of NBC's golf coverage, being used for USGA golf championships (including the U.S. Open), and The Open Championship from 2016 to 2019. During the 2008 Summer Olympics, NBC briefly revived "Roundball Rock", the John Tesh-composed theme music of the former NBA on NBC, as theme music during coverage of the basketball tournaments. The song was brought back again in 2024, this time as a prelude for the return of the NBA to NBC in the 2025–26 season. In 2026, NBC similarly used the former NHL on NBC theme music during hockey coverage.

NBC has utilized other popular music during its Olympics coverage as well. "Home", the debut single of American Idol season 11 winner Phillip Phillips, was used for a segment introducing women's gymnastics at the 2012 Summer Olympics. The segment rejuvenated interest in the song, causing it to re-enter the Billboard Hot 100, and eventually peak at #9. It marked the first time a song had ever made two separate top 10 runs on the Hot 100 in a single calendar year. Prior to the 2016 Summer Olympics, NBC released a promotional video with Olympics highlights set to Katy Perry's recently released single "Rise". "This Is Me" from the soundtrack of The Greatest Showman was also used during NBC's coverage of the 2018 Winter Olympics.

For the 1992 Barcelona Games, NBC also commissioned John Tesh to compose a separate theme for its late night show; variants of this theme were used during the weeks leading up to the Games as the network's theme for coverage of the United States Olympic Trials.

== Reception and criticism ==
=== Accusations of bias ===
While every respective country's broadcast is biased towards the home athletes to a certain extent, NBC has faced scrutiny for allegedly focusing more on American athletes and less on other athletes from other countries, especially during the network's tape delayed primetime coverage. This has proven to be unfounded and indeed NBC has been considered more inclusive of other countries' athletes than other countries' Olympic broadcasters. NBC's focus on U.S. athletes has been the subject of a series of studies which have shown NBC places a heavier emphasis on U.S. athletes during the Summer Games than during the Winter Games. When the NBC 2014 primetime Olympic broadcast was compared to those broadcast in Canada by the CBC, it was determined that CBC placed more emphasis, by a statistically significant margin, on Canadian athletes than NBC placed on U.S. athletes. Furthermore, such countries as Russia (broadcasters Channel One and Match TV), focus solely on its own athletes, ignoring events where they do not participate. By contrast, NBC often devotes considerable coverage to favorite foreigners such as Usain Bolt. Similarly, United Kingdom's state broadcaster BBC was criticized during the 2020 Summer Olympics for "parochial nationalism" and "[remaigining] the greatest sporting pageant on Earth as Team GB vs Everyone Else."

=== Tape delay and formatting of coverage ===
NBC's tape delayed primetime coverage has faced major criticism for many years. Unlike live coverage where viewers can see the events uninterrupted in real time, NBC's tape delaying practices allow for cutting away to commercials and inserting segments profiling American athletes participating in the respective event being shown, which adds even further delay. In 1992, Terry O'Neil, then-executive producer of NBC Sports, coined the phrase "plausibly live" to describe their practice of making the taped broadcasts appear as if they were being aired live.

During the 2000 Summer Olympics, every event shown on NBC and its cable channels was shown on a tape delay due to the time difference between the United States and Sydney, Australia, with the exception of the Men's Gold Medal basketball game. The massive tape delay led to heavy criticism, as some events aired some 16 hours after they were completed, which gave would-be viewers more than enough time to learn the results themselves from competing outlets, including NBC's morning show Today. Indeed, early numbers showed Sydney to be one of the lowest-rated Olympics in the United States since Mexico City in 1968, and 21% lower than 1988—the next most recent games to have been held in late-September rather than July and August. Due to the scheduling, the Games also had to compete with a busy period for domestic sports, including the start of the NFL and college football seasons (a Monday Night Football game was only barely beaten by Olympics coverage one night), and the final weeks of the Major League Baseball regular season.

Because of these tape delay and editing practices, and NBC Sports executives' responses to these criticisms, they have been accused of treating the Olympics more like reality television, as opposed to a conventional telecast of sports. For example, during the 2012 Summer Olympics, NBC Sports chairman Mark Lazarus stated that the reason why they cut from their primetime coverage of Russia's Ksenia Afanasyeva's fall during the women's gymnastics artistic team all-around was "in the interest of time". However, The New York Times noted that Afanasyeva's entire routine was only 1 minute and 38 seconds long, and critics claimed that the real reason for the edit was to create drama and uncertainty over whether the U.S. team would defeat the Russian team in the final round. And during the 2014 Winter Olympics, NBC continued to promote for its primetime coverage Russian figure skater Evgeni Plushenko at the men's singles event even though he withdrew hours earlier due to injury.

During a press event held before the 2016 Summer Olympics, chief marketing officer John Miller addressed the formatting of its primetime coverage, stating that the Olympics were "not about the result, [but] about the journey. The people who watch the Olympics are not particularly sports fans. More women watch the Games than men, and for the women, they're less interested in the result and more interested in the journey. It's sort of like the ultimate reality show and mini-series wrapped into one." Miller's remarks were ridiculed by the media: Linda Stasi of the New York Daily News considered Miller's statement to be "sexist nonsense" and representative of a "pandering, condescending view of the millions of women viewers". Sally Jenkins of the Washington Post said that NBC had often been successful with its "packaging" of the Olympics, and that it was "not inherently sexist for them to say that women have some different viewing habits and interests than men". At the same time, she argued that it was "insulting" for NBC to cater its tape-delayed broadcasts towards a "Ladies' Home Journal crowd", as it alienates conventional sports fans, and harmed the ability to grow a year-round audience for both women's sports and Olympic sports.

In an interview with Slate, former NBC personality Dwight Stones stated that he had left the network due to a history of conflicts with producers over the direction of its track and field coverage. In particular, Stones stated that NBC's producers had downplayed field events because track events were easier to "package" due to being more consistent in their structure. He went on to argue that "Field is 50 percent of the name and 43 percent of the events. And for it to be ignored and belittled the way it has been at the network of the Olympics for the United States through 2032 is a disgrace and a disservice. And I don't see it changing anytime soon with the people that are running that place and the people that are producing the sport."

Reeves Wiedman of The New Yorker argued that NBC's style of coverage focuses too much on the athletes as characters, rather than on the technical aspects of sports that are not typically prominent on U.S. television outside of the Olympics. In particular, he explained that coverage of gymnastics was "hindered by an outdated image of gymnasts as teen-age pixies bouncing around the screen" and "encourages us to look at swimmers as some of the world's premier athletes, and the gymnasts as the world's most coordinated beauty-pageant contestants". Wiedman added that "the idea that viewers staying up late into the night to watch a sport they barely understand have little interest in learning more about it seems wrong-headed", and that "only a very small number of Americans can tell the difference between a Produnova and an Amânar" or know that coaches "pore over the [IFG] Code with the same zeal that Bill Belichick, the New England Patriots' head coach, scours the NFL rule book for trick formations that push up against the boundary of the sport's regulation".

Geoff Baker of The Seattle Times described NBC's coverage this way:

NBC's approach would be like waiting until 8 p.m. to broadcast a [Seattle] Seahawks game against the New England Patriots that happened at 1 p.m. Then, showing only select snippets from each quarter, interspersed with soft features of [Seahawks quarterback] Russell Wilson and [his wife] Ciara, and [Patriots quarterback] Tom Brady and [his wife] Gisele walking hand-in-hand down a beach with Mozart playing in the background.

On the other hand, under NBC's influence as the major revenue stream, some marquee events have been deliberately scheduled to allow live broadcasts in U.S. primetime. This phenomenon has been apparent in Olympics held in Asia-Pacific countries, where marquee events such as swimming (in 2008 and 2020) and figure skating (in 2018 and 2022) were held in the morning rather than the evening. Athletes were required to adjust to these changes, especially if they practiced in the morning, while the scheduling of swimming in 2008 drew the ire of the BBC—as they fell in the early-morning hours in the United Kingdom. Some events at the 2016 Summer Olympics in Rio de Janeiro were scheduled as late as 11:00 p.m. or midnight Brasília Time (which is an hour ahead of Eastern time), to accommodate both NBC and Rede Globo—the main Brazilian rightsholder. Globo had deliberately chosen not to preempt its primetime telenovela lineup during the Olympics, as they are the highest-rated programs on Brazilian television.

==== 2010 Winter Olympics ====
Although the 2010 Winter Olympics were being held in Vancouver—located in the Pacific Time Zone, which is three hours behind the Eastern Time Zone, as previously done with their Olympic coverage, NBC delayed the broadcast of high-profile events held during the day to air in prime time. As a result, almost none of the popular alpine events were shown live. NBC executives explained that this was done because of the higher viewership with coverage in the evening hours. Nevertheless, the 2010 Winter Olympics were assumed to be a financial disaster for NBC, as the network was expected to lose about $250 million after overpaying for the broadcasting rights.

This tape delay practice, even for major events, became increasingly frustrating with viewers, especially with the increased usage of social networking and websites (including the official Vancouver 2010 site and NBC's Olympic website) posting results in real time. This especially held true for viewers in the Pacific, Mountain, Hawaii and Alaska Time Zones, where events were delayed even further by three to six hours or more. The usage of tape delays were particularly frustrating for those in the Pacific Time Zone, as Vancouver not only lies in that time zone, but is in extremely close proximity to the United States – just north of the United States border (with Vancouver being an approximately 2½-hour drive from Seattle). As a result, on February 10, 2010, NBC was just beginning its coverage of the games at 7:30 p.m. Pacific Time in Seattle (over NBC affiliate KING-TV), while the actual ceremony was deep into the artistic portion of the event.

As a result, these practices spurred outrage from viewers and media analysts voicing their opinions on the internet and even raising concerns from politicians. This controversy came mere days following the controversial resolution of the 2010 Tonight Show host and timeslot conflict, which further damaged NBC's already broken image.

In the past, American viewers who lived close to the Canada–US border were able to get around waiting for NBC to air an event by watching Olympic coverage on CBC Television. However, rights to the 2010 games in Canada moved over to CTV, which was not available on many cable systems in the northern U.S. due to programming redundancies during primetime between CTV and the American broadcast networks.

==== 2012 Summer Olympics ====
At the 2012 Summer Olympics, NBC offered live streaming coverage on its Olympics website through a partnership with YouTube, which provided the opportunity to see all events live. NBC also used a mixture of live and tape delayed coverage for its television broadcast due to London being five hours ahead of the Eastern Time Zone. Events contested earlier in the day were able to be shown live on one of the NBCUniversal-owned cable networks. However, events that traditionally draw better ratings, such as swimming, artistic gymnastics, and track and field, were still tape delayed and aired during prime time on NBC. Those events drew their traditionally high ratings, but arguments were lodged about not having the option to watch these events live on television.

Furthermore, members of the U.S. Military were forced to watch the delayed NBC feed despite being within a few hours of the time zones of the event. American Forces Network was contractually hindered by Department of Defense regulations only allowing American feeds of broadcasts to ensure a feel of the broadcast that could be had in the U.S. Additionally, AFN had an agreement with the International Olympic Committee and NBC to only use NBC feeds of the event. Many soldiers in Europe felt slighted by the delays, given comparable local country stations aired the Olympics live on public television feeds as some events aired late at night or early in the morning on AFN.

In a Gallup Poll held during the 2012 Olympics, many indicated that they did not mind the tape delaying for the nighttime window. However, the complaint lodged by the subjects in the poll was that NBC should show the events live on one of their networks, as well as show it in prime time on NBC.

==== 2014 Winter Olympics ====
For its coverage of the 2014 Winter Olympics, NBC streamed every competition live. However, only existing cable and satellite customers, subscribing to packages that include NBC's sister cable networks could access the service. The Canadian Press reported that frustrated viewers were purchasing VPN services to access Canadian IP addresses so they could stream CBC Sports' live coverage instead (which is normally free for those in Canada).

This time, some events that traditionally draw higher ratings were first aired live on one of NBC's sister cable networks (such as NBCSN), and then a tape delayed version was broadcast on NBC in primetime. For coverage of the popular figure skating events, there were two sets of commentators: Terry Gannon, Tara Lipinski and Johnny Weir announced NBCSN's live broadcast; and Tom Hammond, Scott Hamilton and Sandra Bezic anchored the tape delayed coverage on NBC. Invariably, comparisons were made between the two announcing teams; the NBCSN team of Weir and Lipinski received critical acclaim, and were ultimately named NBC's lead commentary team for figure skating later that year.

NBC was criticized over the way its tape delayed primetime coverage handled the news of Russian star figure skater Evgeni Plushenko's withdrawal from competition due to injury. Hours after he announced his withdrawal, NBC continued to air promotions for its primetime show still implying he would skate in the event.

==== 2016 Summer Olympics ====
Variety specifically criticized NBC for its tape delay practices in regards to the Women's artistic team all-round competition in its primetime broadcast, having effectively relegated most of the competition to air past 11:00 p.m. ET/PT, barring a short portion focusing on the vault and uneven bars events at the top of the primetime broadcast, in favor of the swimming competitions of the night. It was noted that "in the midst of a highly anticipated story that had already been ruined for many viewers via the Internet, it felt egregious to push the biggest story of the night to past 11 p.m.", and that NBC was trying to "juice the numbers" by doing so.

==== 2018 Winter Olympics ====
On March 28, 2017, NBC announced that it would air live coverage in primetime for the 2018 Winter Olympics across all time zones, citing the "communal experience" and the ubiquity of social media as justification for this change.

The Asian American Journalists Association, among other groups, has criticized NBC for having its announcers deliberately use an incorrect pronunciation of the host city Pyeongchang (by pronouncing the "-chang" like "bang" instead of correctly saying it like "chong") because, according to Mark Lazarus, chairman of NBC Broadcasting and Sports, this pronunciation is cleaner to an average viewer.

The top anchors of NBC News were also sent to cover the Olympics, which meant that they were unable to cover the Stoneman Douglas High School shooting in Parkland, Florida which occurred on February 14. Therefore, while rivals ABC News, CBS News, CNN and Fox News were able to send their top anchors and reporters on-site to cover this domestic breaking news story, NBC News had to send relatively unknown reporters to cover the shooting.

==== 2020 Summer Olympics ====
In its handling of Simone Biles' withdrawal from the Women's artistic team all-around final, NBC's morning show Today discussed the event but was not allowed to show video footage, and the event was shown as-live during NBC's primetime broadcast. Slate argued that since the network had intensely emphasized Biles during its promotion of the Games, it was "a bit rich for NBC to report on the psychological pressures faced by Biles without also reflecting on the ways in which its choice to make Tokyo the Simone Games surely intensified those pressures", and that "by rejecting the network’s laurels and proceeding on her own terms, Biles is finally writing her own story." Biles's actions were praised and compared to that of other nations' athletes who are "over-determined" to win at any cost. Biles, on the other hand, showcased that the new U.S. approach to the Olympics is focused on athletes' well-being rather than only winning.

=== Opening and closing ceremonies ===
NBC has repeatedly received criticism for how it broadcasts the opening and closing ceremonies of the Olympics, including its frequent refusals to broadcast them live in any form (including online stream) until Tokyo 2020, citing the requirement to add "context" to the telecasts, the removal of ceremony content from these tape delayed broadcasts, as well as the quality of their on-air commentary.

==== 2010 closing ceremony ====
During the closing ceremony of the 2010 Winter Olympics, NBC went into an intermission of coverage at the end of the cultural section at 10:30 p.m. ET to broadcast the premiere episode of The Marriage Ref, and broadcast the remaining portion of the ceremonies on tape delay at 11:35 p.m. after late local newscasts. This spawned outbursts from upset viewers, especially on Twitter.

During the remaining portion after the intermission, several performances were also cut, including French Canadian singer Garou's performance of Jean-Pierre Ferland's "Un peu plus haut, un peu plus loin"; three minutes of commercials were shown in place of his performance.

==== 2012 opening ceremony ====
The commentary – particularly that of Meredith Vieira and Matt Lauer – during the opening ceremony of the 2012 Summer Olympics was criticized as "ignorant" and "banal". They admitted to not knowing who World Wide Web inventor Sir Tim Berners-Lee was, mistakenly claimed that the actual Queen of the United Kingdom had parachuted into the stadium with James Bond (as opposed to a body double), and described Madagascar as "a country associated with a few animated movies". Australia was introduced as a former penal colony, and a joke about the former despotic dictator, Idi Amin, was used to describe Uganda by Bob Costas. Kazakhstan was introduced with comments about the March 2012 incident at the H.H. The Amir of Kuwait International Shooting Grand Prix in Kuwait, in which the mock Kazakhstan anthem from the film Borat was mistakenly played for gold medallist Maria Dmitrenko, and another Central European country was introduced as having no chance of winning medals in that year's Olympics. The NBC defended the comments and style, explaining that it was always intended to be a comedic relief.

NBC also found itself on the defensive over its tape delayed broadcast of the opening ceremony. American viewers took to Twitter to express their dismay at having to wait 3½ hours (6½ hours in the Pacific Time Zone) to see the opening event of the London Olympics. Most of the Twitter posts centered around NBC not offering online streaming of the opening ceremonies for U.S. viewers who wanted to watch the event live. Some Americans elected to watch online streams of the ceremonies provided by either the BBC or CTV if they wanted to watch it live. These failings were picked up during the NBC broadcast by Twitter users with the hashtag #nbcfail.

NBC spokesman Christopher McCloskey said:

It was never our intent to live stream the Opening Ceremony or Closing Ceremony. They are complex entertainment spectacles that do not translate well online because they require context, which our award-winning production team will provide for the large prime-time audiences that gather together to watch them.

Despite these issues or maybe because of them, the Nielsen ratings for the coverage set a record for an Olympics held outside of the United States. The ceremonies drew a 23.0 rating, which was a 7% increase over the 2008 opening ceremony in Beijing.

==== 2012 closing ceremony ====
Due in part to lingering criticism from social media outlets like Twitter, NBC made a last-minute decision to reverse course and stream the closing ceremony live on NBCOlympics.com. However, when it aired on television, the ceremony was heavily edited for time. The ceremony in London lasted three hours, eight minutes and ten seconds; NBC's broadcast of the closing ceremony, by comparison, featured more than 51 minutes and 23 seconds of cuts – 27% of the entire closing ceremony, including the medal ceremony for the men's marathon, a tribute thanking the Olympic volunteers, a ballet sequence featuring Darcey Bussell that accompanied the extinguishing of the Olympic flame, and musical performances by Muse, Kate Bush and Ray Davies.

In addition, the ceremony was preempted before The Who's performance, in order to air a sneak preview of the sitcom Animal Practice and late local newscasts. Again, American viewers expressed their dismay using social media. Bob Costas himself criticized the decision when appearing on TBS' Conan in September 2012: "So here is the balance NBC has to consider: The Who, Animal Practice. Roger Daltrey, Pete Townshend -- monkey in a lab coat. I'm sure you'd be the first to attest, Conan, that when it comes to the tough calls, NBC usually gets 'em right.".

==== 2014 opening ceremony ====
Ignoring past criticisms, NBC again tape delayed the opening ceremony of the 2014 Winter Olympics, and refused to broadcast it live on any platform. NBC Sports chairman Mark Lazarus explained that the delay was so they could "put context to it, with the full pageantry it deserves".

==== 2014 closing ceremony ====
Like in 2012, NBC streamed the closing ceremony in Sochi live on NBCOlympics.com in full, but also cut several portions during its tape delayed primetime telecast. This time, NBC decided against interrupting its coverage midway through the ceremony like it did in 2010 and 2012, and instead aired its scheduled sneak preview episode of the sitcom Growing Up Fisher after the broadcast at 10:30 p.m. Eastern Time. However, that meant that NBC only scheduled a two-hour window for their tape delayed coverage of the ceremony, between a 90-minute documentary on Tonya Harding and Nancy Kerrigan that aired from 7:00 to 8:30 p.m. Eastern, and the Growing Up Fisher preview.

==== 2016 opening ceremony ====
Although NBC promoted that the 2016 Summer Olympics would feature more live coverage than previous years due to the fact that it occurred in a location that is only one hour ahead of the Eastern Time Zone, the company continued with its previous practice of tape delaying the opening ceremony. It began at 7:00 p.m. ET, but was delayed to 8:00 p.m. ET/PT for the U.S. audience, resulting in the ceremony airing on an hour delay on the east coast, and a four-hour delay on the west. NBC cited a need to provide context for the ceremony's contents, as the network viewed the opening ceremony to be an entertainment event rather than sports content.

NBC was ultimately criticized for this tape delay, as well as the large amount of advertising it aired (which the Los Angeles Times argued was the actual reason for the delay); Mediaite calculated that it had aired six breaks amounting to 14 minutes of commercials in the first 40 minutes of the ceremony alone.

Unlike in 2012, viewership for the opening ceremonies via NBC went down to an average of 19.5 million viewers between 8 and 11 PM, a 32% decrease, although the live streaming numbers went up, indicating that audiences gradually switch to the digital medium where they can stream events on demand.

==== 2016 closing ceremony ====
The closing ceremony in Rio was also tape delayed to 8:00 p.m. ET/PT, preceded by an hour-long recap show (Rio Gold). Similarly to Sochi, the closing ceremony's lead-out—a preview of the eleventh season of The Voice, aired at 10:30 p.m.

At least 38% of the ceremony was cut from the NBC primetime broadcast, including portions of the entry of athletes (although Deadspin noted that this portion took "a really, really long time"), a three-minute long montage of highlights from the Games, the medal presentation for the Men's marathon (despite American athlete Galen Rupp having won a bronze medal in the event), the inauguration of new IOC members, and a speech by organizing committee president Carlos Nuzman.

The live stream of the closing ceremony in full was available on NBC's digital platforms and enjoyed great popularity. Overall, live streaming figures topped 1 billion minutes, per NBC post-Olympic press release.

==== 2018 opening ceremony ====
For the first time, NBC announced that it planned to offer a live stream of the opening ceremony. Mark Lazarus cited the ongoing criticism of NBC's decisions to tape delay the ceremonies, as well as changing "consumer behavior", as justification for the decision; Pyeongchang is 14 hours ahead of U.S. Eastern Time. The NBC network also carried its traditional tape delayed broadcast in primetime, without any additional tape delays to other time zones west of Eastern Time.

During the parade of nations, NBC commentator Joshua Cooper Ramo described Japan as "a country which occupied Korea from 1910 to 1945", but "a cultural and technological and economic example that has been so important to their own transformation." The statement received immediate backlash in South Korea for being insensitive and ignorant to the host nation's ongoing disputes with Japan and Japan's history of brutal colonization of Korea. NBC issued an apology and Cooper Ramo resigned.

==== 2018 closing ceremony ====
Like its previous coverage, NBC had a live stream of the closing ceremony without any commentary, and then its traditional tape delayed coverage in primetime, without additional tape delays to the other time zones west of Eastern Time.

==== 2020 opening ceremony ====
In January 2020, NBC announced that it planned to stream the ceremonies of the 2020 Summer Olympics live on Peacock. On February 10, 2021, NBC introduced its regular and full simultaneous live broadcasts of the Olympic ceremonies across all U.S. territories with mandated primetime encores for U.S. time zones outside the East Coast. NBC stated that "following the unprecedented challenges presented by the global COVID pandemic, the world will come together in Tokyo for what could be the most meaningful and anticipated Opening Ceremony ever. Given the magnitude of this event, we want to provide viewers with as many ways to connect to it as possible, live or in primetime."

==== 2022 opening ceremony ====
In late 2021, NBC announced that like the Tokyo Summer Games, it would air the opening ceremony of the 2022 Beijing Winter Olympics live on NBC on the morning of February 4, 2022, with a replay of the ceremony in primetime as well. NBC's broadcast of the opening ceremony was criticized by some conservatives as taking a "both-sides approach" [equally blaming the U.S.] to the issue of human rights abuses in China.

==== 2024 opening ceremony ====
The NBC telecast of the opening ceremony for the Summer Olympics in Paris featured hosts such as Snoop Dogg, Peyton Manning and Kelly Clarkson, whose eponymous talk show is syndicated by the network's distribution arm. Critic Chris Bumbaca wrote in USA Today that "Manning and Clarkson were distracting at best and brutal to listen to at worst. Olympics fans watching at home aren't tuning in to hear a talk-show host (Clarkson) and football analyst (Manning) discuss things outside of their spheres of influence. They want substantive information about the countries and athletes' stories." He did, however, say that "NBC's saving grace may have been Snoop Dogg. The rapper will be featured heavily in the coverage over the next two weeks, and his timing was effective. On Friday, the comedy he provided was desperately needed." Manning and Clarkson were criticized by users on social media. Although the ceremony itself was noted for containing a number of segments that have received criticism from conservative and right-wing movements and governments worldwide, NBC largely avoided involvement in the surrounding controversy.

A total of 28.6 million viewers watched the opening ceremony on NBC and Peacock, more than 60% up from the Tokyo Olympics and also an 8% increase over the 2016 Rio opening ceremony.

==== 2026 opening ceremony ====
During the Parade of Nations, U.S. Vice President JD Vance, which NBC appeared to have cut from footage, and the Israeli team were booed by some of the audience present. While the negative reception was heard on OBS broadcasts, NBC's telecast received accusations of censorship.

The ceremony was seen by 21.4 million viewers in the United States, a 34% increase from the 2022 Winter Olympics.

=== 2012 Summer Paralympics ===
Despite the 2012 Summer Paralympics being a breakthrough games for media coverage, helping significantly boost overall audience shares for British broadcaster Channel 4 and Australia's ABC, no Paralympics events were shown live on television in the United States. International Paralympic Committee President Philip Craven criticized North American broadcasters, and NBC specifically, for having fallen behind the times and said that the International Paralympic Committee would scrutinize its broadcast partners more carefully in the future. "If the values fit, we've got a chance. If they don't we'll go somewhere else," he said.

In September 2013, NBC subsequently acquired the rights to the 2014 and 2016 Paralympics, and announced plans to air a combined 116 hours of coverage from both Games. Craven praised NBC's decision to devote a larger amount of airtime to future Paralympics, sharing his hope that U.S. audiences would be "as captivated and emotionally enthralled as the billions around the world who tuned in to London 2012 last summer." NBC further acquired rights to broadcast the 2018 and 2020 editions. The company announced more than 1200 hours of coverage for the 2020 Summer Paralympics, called "unprecedented" by the International Paralympic Committee.

=== Other criticism ===
==== 2014 Winter Olympics ====
On February 16, 2014, reporter and former women's alpine skiing silver medalist Christin Cooper received criticism for her interview with American Bode Miller after his bronze medal win in the men's super G event. During the post-event interview, as Miller became increasingly emotional, Cooper repeatedly questioned him about his late brother Chelone, who had died the previous April at the age of 29, until Miller broke down in tears and was unable to continue the interview. For her pressing of the issue, Cooper was described as having badgered Miller. NBC also received criticism for keeping the cameras on Miller, who sagged on the railing and cried without speaking, for more than a full minute, despite having had several hours in which to edit the footage before airing it. Later that evening, Miller tweeted his fans should "be gentle" with Cooper, as it was "not at all her fault," and "she asked the questions every interviewer would have." The following morning on Today, Miller reiterated his support for Cooper, saying, "I have known Christin a long time, and she's a sweetheart of a person. I know she didn't mean to push. I don't think she really anticipated what my reaction was going to be, and I think by the time she realized it, it was too late. I don't blame her at all."

Matt Lauer, who had been filling in for Bob Costas while the latter was ill, had engaged in inappropriate and unwanted sexual behavior with subordinates during the Games. This was one of the factors that led to his termination from NBC on November 29, 2017.

==== 2016 Summer Olympics ====
On August 16, 2016, boxing analyst Teddy Atlas accused NBC of deliberately "hiding" corrupt boxing competitions in Rio in an effort to hide suspected corruption by AIBA—the international governing body of boxing at the Olympics. He cited limited coverage as part of NBC's televised broadcasts, as well as the network's refusal to invite him back, after having called out questionable officiating during a controversial bout between Magomed Abdulhamidov and Satoshi Shimizu in 2012. The next day, it was reported that AIBA would remove several referees and judges from the competition under suspicion that they were not making decisions "at the levels expected".

As Hungarian swimmer Katinka Hosszú won a gold medal and broke a world record during the 400-meter individual medley, Dan Hicks credited a man responsible for helping her break the world record and win the gold medal. There was no reference to who the "man" was, although some on social media angrily speculated that Hicks was alluding to Katinka Hosszú's then-husband, Shane Tusup (who was also the coach of the Hungarian Swimming Team). The comment from Hicks was criticized as sexist. Hicks later said "It is impossible to tell Katinka's story accurately without giving appropriate credit to Shane, and that's what I was trying to do." He also added that "with live TV, there are often times you look back and wished you had said things differently." The next day, Al Trautwig was criticized for stating incorrect information about the parents of American gymnast Simone Biles. On air, Trautwig stated that Ron Biles and Nellie Biles are Simone's grandparents that adopted her and her sister in 2001. Later on, Trautwig tweeted that Ron and Nellie were actually her parents, to which fans on Twitter started the hashtag, #FireTrautwig. Trautwig later apologized, stating "I regret that I wasn't more clear in my wording on the air. I compounded the error on Twitter, which I quickly corrected. To set the record straight, Ron and Nellie are Simone's parents."

On August 9, some viewers became upset on Twitter after commentator Cynthia Potter failed to mention that British diver Tom Daley was a well known gay athlete, as Potter was focused on the replays. NBC later made a statement to The Advocate that "with more than 11,000 athletes at the Games, it is not always possible to identify every competitor's significant other, regardless of their sexual orientation." Later, the partner of Brazilian volleyball player Larissa França, Liliane Maestrini, was referred to by commentator Chris Marlowe as her "husband". It led to confusion and dismay for some viewers as Larissa and Liliane are both female and are a same-sex couple. NBC later apologized stating that "Liliane is Larissa's wife."

==== 2018 Winter Olympics ====
Bode Miller was criticized for on-air remarks about Austrian skier Anna Veith, suggesting that her marriage to Manuel Veith was affecting her performance.

During the Women's super-G competition, NBC prematurely cut away from the competition to return to figure skating, while commentators acknowledged on-air multiple times that Anna Veith had won the gold medal. However, snowboarder Ester Ledecká would overtake Veith in an upset victory, beating her by one hundredth of a second. Ledecká had recently begun a career in alpine, and had been considered an underdog in the competition, having been ranked 49th in the world and have never medaled in any major international skiing meet. NBC eventually returned to the event to report on the final result, with commentator Dan Hicks remarking "Well, these are the Olympics, and anything can happen."

==== 2022 Winter Olympics ====
In the lead up to the 2022 Winter Olympics in Beijing, American right-wing politicians and media personalities heavily criticized NBC for continuing to promote their broadcast of the Games despite both the diplomatic boycott announced by President Biden and the controversy surrounding what they described as a genocide of Uyghurs perpetrated by China. Some Republican senators including Josh Hawley endorsed the anti-NBC campaign.

On December 6, 2021, President Biden announced the United States would diplomatically boycott the 2022 Winter Games. The diplomatic boycott had no effect on the American athletes' participation or on NBC's broadcast of the Olympics, both of which would have been affected had a full boycott had been put in place.

== See also ==
- USA Network Olympic broadcasts
- CNBC Olympic broadcasts
- ABC Olympic broadcasts
- CBS Olympic broadcasts
- TNT Olympic broadcasts
- Olympics on television

== Notes ==
Preceded by ABC (1968)	U.S. Winter Olympics Broadcaster; NBC Sports; Olympics on NBC (1972)	Succeeded by ABC (1976–1988)
Preceded by CBS/TNT (1992–1998)	U.S. Winter Olympics Broadcaster; NBC Sports; Olympics on NBC (2002–)	Succeeded by Present
Preceded by CBS (1960)	U.S. Summer Olympics Broadcaster; NBC Sports; Olympics on NBC (1964)	Succeeded by ABC (1968–1976)
Preceded by ABC (1968–1976)	U.S. Summer Olympics Broadcaster; NBC Sports; Olympics on NBC (1980)	Succeeded by ABC (1984)
Preceded by ABC (1984)	U.S. Summer Olympics Broadcaster; NBC Sports; Olympics on NBC (1988–)	Succeeded by Present

Preceded by The Equalizer; 2021	Super Bowl lead-out program Olympics on NBC; 2022	Succeeded by Next Level Chef; 2023
