= Olympics Triplecast =

1992 experimental pay-per-view telecast of Olympic events in the United States

The Olympics Triplecast was an experimental pay-per-view television package in the United States during the 1992 Summer Olympics in Barcelona. While an ambitious project, the Triplecast – a joint venture of NBC and Cablevision – was a massive financial failure.

== Overview and history ==
NBC, which had broadcast rights to the Games, (Note: By 1992, televising the Olympics had become a costly proposition. NBC won the rights to the Summer Games in Barcelona with a bid of $401 million, thinking ABC and CBS were both going to bid $400 million each (in the end, the highest rival bid was closer to $ 300 million). In an attempt to recoup the cost, NBC decided, in addition to its own extensive over-the-air TV coverage, to partner with Cablevision Systems Corporation (who were joint owners of Rainbow Programming Holdings, parent company to several cable networks) and produce round-the-clock (twelve hours live each day, then repeated for the next twelve hours) coverage of other Olympic events on three pay-per-view channels. The venture was a financial disaster, with NBC and Cablevision each losing about $50 million.) believed that viewers would be willing to pay US$95 to $170 to watch events live, which would normally be shown on tape delay on the network in prime time. It partnered with Cablevision, a prominent New York cable provider, to create three channels, dubbed Red, White, and Blue. A special three-button remote control with the colors of the channels as the buttons was offered by some cable operators for free as a lure to sign up for the service. Channels aired twelve hours per day (from 5 a.m. to 5 p.m. ET) then repeated their content for the other twelve hours. Programs came from the world feed. As an added inducement for viewers to order the package, Triplecast coverage featured star announcers and pundits, such as Chick Hearn for basketball and Bob Papa for boxing.

=== Channel programs ===
- The Red channel featured swimming events during the first week and track and field events during the second week.
- The White channel featured many individual sports, such as gymnastics, boxing, rowing, equestrian and other sports.
- The Blue channel featured team sports, such as basketball, baseball, volleyball, water polo, and team handball.

== Issues ==
Several issues plagued the Triplecast.

=== Logistics ===
Cable providers took a lower profit cut than they normally do for pay-per-view events. A national center was also set up (1-800-OLYMPIC) to take calls, but it often had trouble telling if a viewer's cable system was participating. In January 1992, for instance, Chuck Dolan, head of Cablevision, tested the ordering system, which could not tell if his Cablevision Long Island system was carrying the Triplecast.

=== Low uptake ===
The biggest issue with the Triplecast was low uptake. NBC had estimated some two million people would subscribe to the programming. But Triplecast projections were only around 200,000-250,000, and the Pay-Per-View Update industry newsletter estimated 125,000. Early reports of slow sales even inspired David Letterman, then hosting NBC's Late Night, to make jokes about the Triplecast. Midway through the Games, discounts were applied for single-day service and weekend packages were added. But these attempts to boost the subscriber numbers largely failed. Another attempt to boost interest was made by airing a three-way split screen of the Triplecast channels in hour-long blocks on CNBC, but with no audio.

The final tally of Olympics Triplecast subscribers was 200,000. It was enough of a flop that Chuck Dolan was already acknowledging by August 6 that "the public didn't find enough incremental value for the Triplecast over what they could get on NBC" and that "we blew it from an economic point of view." It also surfaced that research figures were enhanced. While one percent of surveyed viewers said they would "definitely" buy the Triplecast, that number was enhanced in press materials by adding those who declared they would "probably" buy the service.

=== Cannibalizing the main coverage ===
The Triplecast service took a very austere, no-frills approach to broadcasting that included event play-by-play and commentary, but few graphics and absolutely no feature stories or background vignettes. According to some Triplecast viewers, this made the primary NBC coverage seem "schmaltzy and overproduced". Additionally, NBC's main coverage was denigrated to an extent due to Triplecast viewers knowing some results ten hours or more before the events were aired on the main network.

=== Advertising ===
Original Triplecast advertising promoted that the service was "live with no interruptions" — though half of the broadcast day was a repeat. The New York City Consumer Affairs Department charged NBC and Cablevision with deception in advertising as a result. Eventually, the parties settled, with NBC and Cablevision agreeing to clarify the advertising. In addition, about 10 percent of NBC's 205 affiliates refused to run Triplecast advertising because they did not want to promote competition for their broadcast. Some affiliates still aired the promos but with disclaimers stating that coverage will still air on the station for free.

== Legacy ==
Even before the Olympics started, many criticized the business model. On July 16, nine days before the Opening Ceremony, one Philadelphia Inquirer writer called it "the biggest marketing disaster since New Coke". The Triplecast was deemed by The New York Times "sports TV's biggest flop" and that NBC and Cablevision were "bereft in sanity" in operating it. By 1994, it was referred to as "the Heaven's Gate of television". Albert Kim, the editor of Entertainment Weekly, went on National Public Radio and called it "an unmitigated disaster for NBC". It was a loss of about $100 million (half of which was covered by Cablevision under agreement) for the two parties. It also shaped NBC's strategies in the coverage of future Olympics.

NBC did not use pay-per-view to cover any future games. While NBC alone broadcast the 1996 Summer Olympic Games in the United States, it decided to use cable television partners for its subsequent telecasts. CBS, which had the broadcast rights to the 1992, 1994 and 1998 Winter Olympic Games, also used a cable partner, TNT.

- CNBC and MSNBC showed the 2000 Summer Games and 2002 Winter Games along with NBC, and three newer acquisitions (Bravo and USA Network in English and Telemundo in Spanish) joined the coverage for the 2004 Summer Games. Universal HD was added for the 2006 Winter Games. This arrangement continued, with Oxygen taking the place of Bravo for the 2008 Games, and excluded from the 2010 Games due to a lack of programming (NBC's digital subchannel Universal Sports began to air analysis shows during those Games). The NBC Sports Network showed all U.S. Olympic events in the 2012 Olympic Games.
- For the 2008 Summer Olympics, NBC offered to cable operators the NBC Olympic Basketball Channel and NBC Olympic Soccer Channel, which broadcast exclusively in high definition and aired all the events in both sports without any commercial interruptions. During halftimes and before each game, a wide-angle shot of the venue from the default world feed was shown instead along with highlights without commentary, while non-programming hours consisted of rolling statistics or a test pattern; later years now feature a continuous loop of the previous day's action. The network also used the same setup for the 2012 and 2016 Games.
- During the 2008 Summer Olympics, NBC also streamed 2,200 hours of 25 different sports live on NBCOlympics.com. Most events shown on NBCOlympics.com were shown with no commentary. The number of hours of coverage has expanded further for each succeeding Games.
- For the 2018 Winter Olympics, the addition of the new Olympic Channel will allow further expansion overall to the network's schedule of coverage.
- For the 2020 Summer Olympics, NBC’s streaming service Peacock also became a part of its coverage, showing highlights and even airing exclusive live coverage of select events.

NBC currently holds the U.S. rights to the Olympics through 2036.
