= FIFA World Cup on NBC =

Broadcasts of the World Cup in 1966 and 1986

FIFA World Cup on NBC is the branding used for presentations of the FIFA World Cup produced by the NBC television network in the United States. NBC was the official American network television broadcaster for the international association football competition in 1966 and 1986.

== Coverage history ==
=== 1966 ===
The first American coverage of the World Cup consisted only of a previously filmed telecast of the 1966 Final on NBC. The Final was aired before their coverage of the Saturday Major League Baseball Game of the Week. NBC used the black & white BBC feed and aired it on a two-hour film delay. This was the first time soccer had been shown in the United States as a stand-alone broadcast. Previously, ABC's Wide World of Sports had shown England's Football Association Cup on as long as a two-week delay.

=== 1986 ===
On October 6, 1984. NBC's anthology series, SportsWorld provided World Cup soccer qualifying coverage featuring the United States and the Netherlands Antilles.

1986 marked the first time that the World Cup had extensive live cable and network television coverage in the United States. ESPN carried most of the weekday matches while NBC did weekend games. To be more specific, NBC aired seven matches, including the "Hand of God" quarterfinal, with broadcasters on-site. NBC's theme music for their 1986 coverage was Herb Alpert's "1980", from his 1979 album Rise. It was originally a cue meant for the ill-fated 1980 Moscow Summer Olympics broadcasts. Meanwhile, ESPN aired about 25 matches that year, all with broadcasters in studio.

NBC's producers were forced to run the games' audio feed through telephone lines rather than through satellites. This was because the International Broadcast Center in Mexico City crossed up many communication lines. Consequently, various countries received commentary from others (or no sound or video at all). NBC in this case, received commentary from somewhere in Southeast Asia and so were forced to have Charlie Jones call collect and broadcast the Italy-Bulgaria opener via a handset telephone receiver. NBC lost the sound but still had video so Charlie Jones dialed collect again.

==== Commentators ====
- Don Criqui (studio host)
- Rick Davis (color commentary)
- Charlie Jones (play-by-play)
- Seamus Malin (studio analyst)
- Paul Gardner (color commentary)

=== Telemundo Deportes' coverage ===
On October 22, 2011, Deportes Telemundo acquired the Spanish language rights to broadcast the FIFA Men's and Women's World Cup for around $600 million, replacing Univision as the tournament's Spanish language broadcaster, which began carrying the World Cup tournaments in 1970 (Fox acquired the English language U.S. broadcast rights through a separate agreement). The deal, which began with the 2015 Women's World Cup and runs through 2026, includes rights to associated FIFA-sanctioned tournaments (including the Men's Under 20 and Under 17 World Cups, and the Men's Beach Soccer World Cup), which will be telecast on Telemundo and NBC Universo; the deal was extended on February 12, 2015, to include rights to the 2026 FIFA World Cup.

On May 16, 2015, during Telemundo's 2015–16 upfront presentation in New York City, it was announced that Deportes Telemundo would be replaced by a new division initially known as NBC Deportes; the new division was formed as a branch of the English-language NBC Sports division, and be responsible for sports content for Telemundo, NBC Universo and related digital platforms. While it retained all existing sports telecast rights and programs aired by both Telemundo and NBC Universo, the latter network also began to expand its sports coverage, primarily in preparation for the 2016 Summer Olympics and the start of the division's contract with FIFA—whose first events included the 2015 U-20 World Cup and Women's World Cup.

== See also ==
- Soccer on NBC Sports
- MLS on NBC
- Premier League on NBC
