= Soccer on NBC Sports =

Presentations of soccer by NBC

- Genre: Soccer telecasts
- Country of origin: United States
- Original language: English

Production
- Camera setup: Multi-camera
- Running time: 3+ hours (or until game ends)
- Production company: NBC Sports

Original release
- Network: NBC

Soccer on NBC Sports is a number of television programs that have aired soccer matches in the United States on NBC and NBCSN. These matches are from International, European, and American competitions. On August 10, 2011, NBC Sports announced a new three-year broadcasting contract with Major League Soccer to produce games for the 2012 season on NBC and the NBC Sports Network. This included the broadcast of two regular season games, two playoff games, and two national team matches on NBC and 38 regular season games, three playoff games, and two national team matches on NBC Sports Network. On October 28, 2012, NBC Sports also announced a three-year, $250 million deal to televise Premier League soccer in English (primarily on NBCSN) and Spanish (on Telemundo and mun2) beginning with the 2013–14 season, replacing ESPN and Fox Soccer as the league's U.S. broadcasters.

== FIFA World Cup ==
The first American coverage of the World Cup consisted only of a previously filmed telecast of the 1966 Final on NBC. The Final was aired before their coverage of the Saturday Major League Baseball Game of the Week. NBC used the black & white BBC feed and aired it on a two-hour film delay. This was the first time soccer had been shown in the United States as a stand-alone broadcast.

1986 marked the first time that the World Cup had extensive live cable and network television coverage in the United States. ESPN carried most of the weekday matches while NBC did weekend games. To be more specific, NBC aired seven matches, including the "Hand of God" quarterfinal, with broadcasters on-site. NBC's theme music for their 1986 coverage was Herb Alpert's "1980", from his 1979 album Rise.

== Major League Soccer ==
On January 5, 2012, NBC Sports signed a three-year contract with Major League Soccer to nationally televise 40 matches per year, which would primarily air on the NBC Sports Network (now NBCSN), beginning with the 2012 season. All NBC telecasts included pre-game and post-game coverage, with the network intending to promote its games during broadcasts of its other major sports properties, such as the Olympics. More specifically as part of the new deal, NBC would carry three regular season and two playoff matches (the first time since 2002 that that many MLS games were to be broadcast on English-language network television), as well as 38 regular season and three playoff matches on sister channel NBCSN; both networks also aired matches featuring the United States men's national soccer team (with two games airing on each network).

NBC and NBCSN's MLS telecasts during the 2013 season averaged 115,000 viewers per game, a steep drop from 2012. Looking to capitalize on further soccer opportunities, NBC Sports acquired the rights to the Premier League from Fox Soccer in 2012, in time for the 2013–14 Premier League season. Speculation abounded on if MLS was to be treated by the sports division secondarily to the Premier League, which has a greater U.S. audience than the domestic league, placing MLS' future with NBC in doubt.

In 2014, negotiations broke down between NBC and MLS on a new television contract. The league instead signed an agreement with Fox Sports to serve as its U.S. broadcast partner, beginning with the 2015 season in a shared rights deal with ESPN.

== Premier League ==
NBC acquired rights to the Premier League in 2013, replacing Fox Sports and ESPN. NBC's studio programming for the league includes the pre-match show Premier League Live, and the highlights shows Premier League Goal Zone and Match of the Day (modeled upon the similar BBC series). NBC Sports president of programming Jon Miller explained that their main goal was to not "Americanize" their coverage (besides providing explanations of terminology unfamiliar to U.S. viewers, such as derbies), citing their decision to employ talent (such as former ESPN UK and BBC Sport presenter Rebecca Lowe, who became NBC's lead host) who "know the Premier League and can talk about it intelligently". In 2014, NBC also hired the duo of Michael Davies and Roger Bennett—the "Men in Blazers"—to provide soccer-oriented content across NBC Sports' platforms.

== FA Women's Super League ==
In September 2020, NBC agreed to a season-long partnership with ATA Football to broadcast up to 50 FA Women's Super League matches during 2020-21 season. The plan is for 12 matches to be broadcast on NBCSN, while other matches will be available via the NBC Sports website and app. NBC's coverage ended after the broadcasting rights moved to CBS Sports starting the 2022-23 season.
