= ABC Olympic broadcasts =

- Genre: Olympics telecasts
- Opening theme: "Bugler's Dream" 1968
- Country of origin: United States
- Original language: English
- No. of seasons: 10

Production
- Production locations: Various Olympic venues (event telecasts and studio segments)
- Camera setup: Multi-camera
- Running time: Varies
- Production company: ABC Sports

Original release
- Network: ABC
- Release: January 29, 1964 – February 28, 1988

Related
- NBC (1964, 1972, 1988-present); CBS (1960, 1992-1998); TNT (1992-1998)

The title card for the ABC Olympic Games coverage. Note the integration of the network logo into the Olympic symbol.

The Olympic Games aired in the United States on the broadcast network ABC at various times from the 1960s to the 1980s. ABC first televised the Winter Olympic Games in 1964, and the Summer Olympic Games in 1968. ABC last televised the Summer Olympics in 1984 and Winter Olympics in 1988.

== History ==
=== 1960s ===
While CBS aired both the 1960 Winter and Summer Games (marking the first time that the Olympics were broadcast on American television), by 1964, a different network showed the Winter Games: ABC. Roone Arledge won broadcast rights for his network and began a relationship with the "five rings" that would last over two decades. The program used many of the same production staff from ABC's Wide World of Sports, as well as the same host, Jim McKay, who moved to ABC from CBS in 1961. In 1968, ABC showed both the Winter Games and the Summer Games.

==== 1964 Winter Olympics ====
The 1964 Winter Games were in Innsbruck, Austria, and coverage was taped and flown by plane back to the United States. All of it was in black-and-white, but with most Winter Olympic events in the morning (local time), most TV coverage aired the day the events were held. A portion of the closing ceremony was televised live via satellite (Telstar, which had to be tracked and allowed about a 15-minute window between the U.S. and Europe when it was zooming over the Atlantic). Everything else was videotaped and flown to the U.S. via a Munich-London-New York route. There was little margin for error. If a flight was canceled, ABC had a tape of a U.S.-Romania hockey game, played the day before the opening ceremony and shipped over, ready to play. All went well and it never made the air.

ABC aired 16.5 hours of coverage of the Innsbruck Games, the majority of the coverage occurring outside of primetime.

==== 1968 Winter Olympics ====
By 1968, ABC was broadcasting the Olympics in full color, and satellites made possible live coverage of several events at the Winter Games in Grenoble, France. In reality, only the opening ceremony and the ladies figure skating final were televised live via satellite; most other coverage was sent via satellite to ABC and run off tape from New York. The 1968 Winter Olympics were the first to be televised in color (except for a couple of events French television fed in black-and-white). Highlighting the 1968 Winter Games was a dramatic sweep in men's alpine skiing by Frenchman Jean-Claude Killy.

==== 1968 Summer Olympics ====
Nearly all of ABC's coverage of the Summer Games in Mexico City was broadcast live due to the lack of time difference and how close America and Mexico are in travel. The major highlight of the Summer Games was a world-record long jump by Bob Beamon of the United States, which was aired live in the US.

=== Coverage of the 1972 Munich massacre ===
In 1972, NBC showed the Winter Games from Sapporo, Japan, then ABC returned to carry the Summer Games in Munich, Germany. It was during the Summer Games that Palestinian terrorists attacked the Olympic Village and killed 11 Israeli athletes. Although Chris Schenkel was the actual host of the Games that year, Arledge assigned the story to McKay largely because McKay had been a local news anchor in Baltimore, Maryland prior to joining CBS in 1950 and later ABC in 1961. McKay was joined on set by ABC news correspondent (and former and future evening news anchor) Peter Jennings, and coverage continued for many hours, until the outcome was known. Howard Cosell went with the film crew to get interviews in the village.

After an unsuccessful rescue attempt of the athletes held hostage, at 3:24 AM German Time, McKay came on the air with this statement:

When I was a kid my father used to say "Our greatest hopes and our worst fears are seldom realized." Our worst fears have been realized tonight. They have now said there were 11 hostages; two were killed in their rooms this morn-- yesterday morning, nine were killed at the airport tonight. They're all gone.

— McKay, 1972

McKay later won an Emmy Award for his coverage. He stated in a 2003 HBO documentary about his life and career that he was most proud of a telegram he received from Walter Cronkite the day after the massacre praising his work.

Keith Jackson was also involved in ABC's coverage of the 1972 Summer Olympics and continued to contribute even when the attack by Palestinian terrorists transformed the coverage from that of a typical sporting event to a greater international and historical news event. In all, he covered a total of 10 Summer and Winter Olympic Games. Jackson covered swimming at the 1972 Summer Olympics in Munich and track and field at the 1976 Summer Games in Montreal. He covered speed-skating during the 1980 Winter Olympics in Lake Placid featuring Eric Heiden. He was offered the position of play-by-play for hockey, but turned it down (the position ultimately went to Al Michaels). Jackson called speed skating and ski jumping at the 1984 Winter Olympics in Sarajevo, and covered basketball for the 1984 Summer Olympics in Los Angeles. He was the weekend afternoon host for ABC's final Olympics in 1988 from Calgary.

=== 1976–1988 ===
By the time the 1976 edition came around, McKay was now installed as the host, a role he would play throughout the 1970s and '80s. ABC also aired the 1980 Winter Olympics.

In the 1976 Summer Games in Montreal, and the 1984 games in Los Angeles, Howard Cosell was the main voice for boxing. Sugar Ray Leonard won the gold medal in his light welterweight class at Montreal, beginning his meteoric rise to a world professional title three years later. Cosell became close to Leonard during this period, announcing many of his fights.

Chuck Mangione's instrumental song "Give It All You Got" was originally featured as the official theme of the 1980 Winter Olympics, held in Lake Placid, New York. ABC had used Mangione's recordings four years earlier during their coverage of the 1976 Summer Olympics, and then-ABC Sports president Roone Arledge asked the musician to create the theme song for the Winter games. Mangione also performed the song live at the closing ceremonies on February 24.

The 1980 Winter Olympics was the setting for the "Miracle on Ice", a medal-round men's ice hockey game in Lake Placid, New York, on February 22. The United States team, made up of amateur and collegiate players and led by coach Herb Brooks, defeated the Soviet team, which consisted of veteran professional players with significant experience in international play. The rest of the United States (except those who watched the game live on Canadian television) had to wait to see the game, as ABC decided to broadcast the late-afternoon game on tape delay in prime time. Sportscaster Al Michaels, who was calling the game on ABC along with former Montreal Canadiens goalie Ken Dryden, picked up on the countdown in his broadcast, and delivered his famous call:

Eleven seconds, you've got ten seconds, the countdown going on right now! Morrow, up to Silk. Five seconds left in the game. Do you believe in miracles? YES!

An indent for ABC Sports' coverage of the 1984 Winter Olympics. This instance during the closing ceremony.

The opening and closing ceremonies of the 1984 Summer Olympics, and 1988 Winter Olympics were hosted on ABC by Jim McKay and Peter Jennings.

ABC Sports also covered the 1984 Winter Olympics in Sarajevo, Yugoslavia, and the 1984 Summer Olympics in Los Angeles, USA. That year, Kathleen Sullivan became the first woman to anchor a telecast of the Olympic Games.

The 1988 Winter Olympics in Calgary, Alberta, Canada is the most recent Olympics to date to be covered by ABC Sports.

=== Since the 1988 Winter Games ===
After winning the rights to the 1988 Winter Games, ABC, at the insistence of new owner Capital Cities Communications opted not to bid for the rights to the next few Games, much to the chagrin of Roone Arledge's successor at ABC Sports, Dennis Swanson.

In 1993, ABC made a bid for the rights for the 1996 Summer Games from Atlanta. According to Al Michaels, a provision in his contract renewal with ABC back in 1992 would have allowed him to become the Olympics prime time anchor while Jim McKay would instead play an emeritus role. Ultimately though, NBC won the rights to the Atlanta Games for $456 million, edging out ABC's bid.

The Walt Disney Company acquired Capital Cities/ABC in 1995 and began to slowly integrate ABC Sports and ESPN. The merger of ABC Sports division into ESPN was completed in 2006, and sports broadcasts on ABC have since been produced by ESPN using the ESPN on ABC branding. In August 2008, ESPN/ABC stated that they would make a serious bid for the 2014 games in Sochi, Russia and the 2016 games in Rio de Janeiro, Brazil. However, NBC won the rights to American television coverage of the Olympics through the 2020 Summer Games. NBC subsequently agreed to contract extensions, with the most recent one signed in 2025, allowing them to hold control of the Olympic television coverage in the United States through the 2036 Summer Games.

== Hours of coverage ==
=== Winter Olympic Games ===
Year	Host	Hours of Coverage	Rights Fee
1964	Innsbruck, Austria	17.5	$597,000
1968	Grenoble, France	27	$2,500,000
1976	Innsbruck, Austria	43.5	$10,000,000
1980	Lake Placid, United States	53.25	$15,500,000
1984	Sarajevo, Yugoslavia	63	$91,500,000
1988	Calgary, Canada	94.5	$309,000,000

=== Summer Olympic Games ===
Year	Host	Hours of Coverage	Rights Fee
1968	Mexico City, Mexico	43.75	$4,500,000
1972	Munich, West Germany	62.75	$7,500,000
1976	Montreal, Canada	76.5	$25,000,000
1984	Los Angeles, United States	180	$225,000,000

== Commentators ==
=== Hosts ===
==== Winter Olympic Games ====
Year	Prime-Time Host	Daytime Host(s)	Late-Night Host(s)
1964	Jim McKay		
1968	Chris Schenkel; Jim McKay (Note: Jim McKay hosted opening and closing ceremonies only, Chris Schenkel hosted the Olympics.)		
1976	Jim McKay		
1980	Jim McKay		
1984	Jim McKay	Jim Lampley; Kathleen Sullivan	Donna de Varona
1988	Jim McKay; Keith Jackson (Note: Jim McKay hosted Monday to Friday, Keith Jackson hosted weekends.)	Keith Jackson	Frank Gifford; Kathie Lee Gifford

==== Summer Olympic Games ====
Year	Prime-Time Host	Daytime Host(s)	Late-Night Host(s)
1968	Chris Schenkel		
1972	Chris Schenkel		
1976	Jim McKay		
1984	Jim McKay	Frank Gifford; Kathleen Sullivan	Jim Lampley; Donna de Varona

== See also ==
- Olympics on NBC
- CBS Olympic broadcasts
- TNT Olympic broadcasts
- Olympics on television

== Notes ==
Preceded by CBS (1960)	U.S. Winter Olympics Broadcaster; ABC Sports; Olympics on ABC (1964–1968)	Succeeded by NBC (1972)
Preceded by NBC (1972)	U.S. Winter Olympics Broadcaster; ABC Sports; Olympics on ABC (1976–1988)	Succeeded by CBS (1992–1998)
Preceded by NBC (1964)	U.S. Summer Olympics Broadcaster; ABC Sports; Olympics on ABC (1968–1976)	Succeeded by NBC (1980)
Preceded by NBC (1980)	U.S. Summer Olympics Broadcaster; ABC Sports; Olympics on ABC (1984)	Succeeded by NBC (1988–present)
