= Olympic Channel (American TV channel) =

American television sports channel

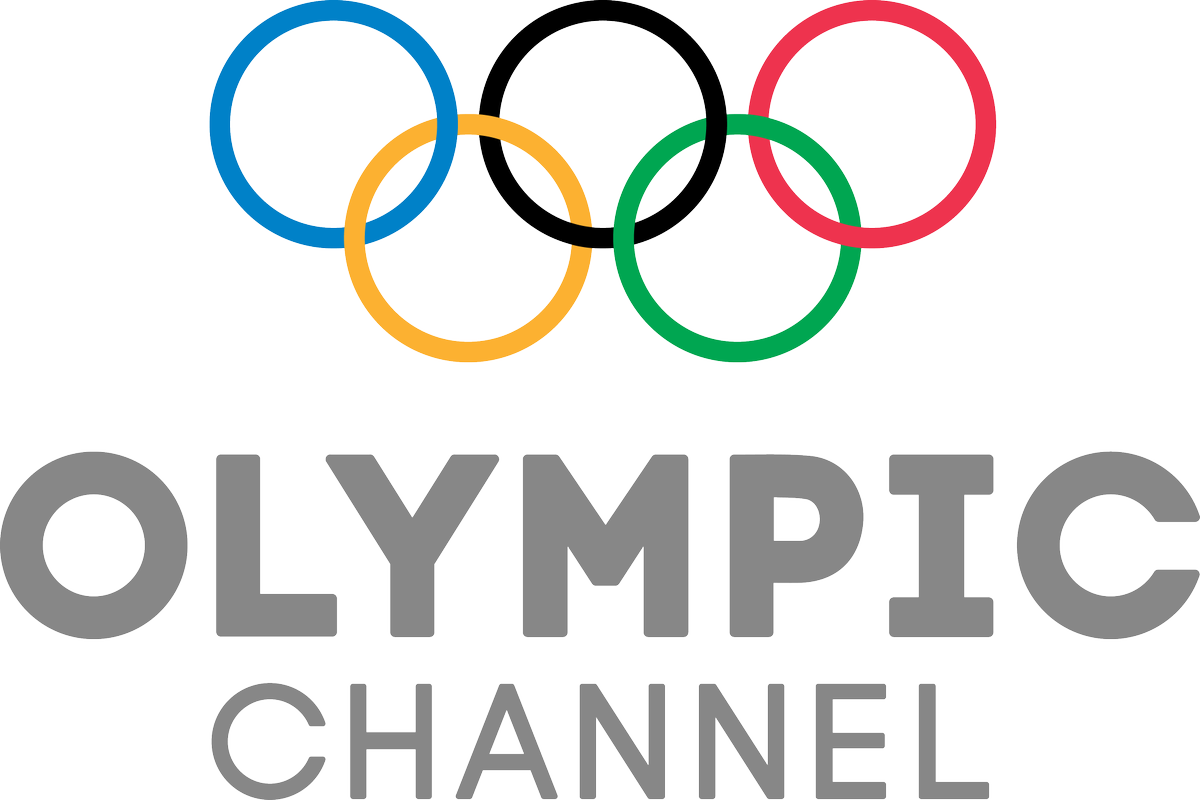
- Country: United States
- Broadcast area: Nationwide
- Headquarters: New York City, New York; Colorado Springs, Colorado

Programming
- Language: English
- Picture format: 1080i HDTV

Ownership
- Owner: NBC Olympics; United States Olympic Committee; NBC Sports Group (NBCUniversal)
- Sister channels: NBC; Universo; NBC Sports Regional Networks; Golf Channel; USA Network; Syfy; CNBC

History
- Launched: July 31, 2003; 23 years ago
- Closed: September 30, 2022; 4 years ago
- Former names: Bravo HD+ (2003–2004); Universal HD (2004–2017)

Links
- Website: Official website

Olympic Channel (branded as Olympic Channel: Home of Team USA) was an American pay television sports channel owned by the NBC Olympics, a joint venture between NBC Sports and the United States Olympic Committee. It was dedicated to Olympic sports, and was a franchise of the International Olympic Committee's (IOC) Olympic Channel operation.

The network was founded in 2003 as Bravo HD+, which aired programs from the fellow NBC Universal network Bravo that had been produced in high definition. In 2004, the network was re-branded as Universal HD, serving as an outlet for HD broadcasts of programming from NBC Universal channels, as well as acquired films and television series. This format became increasingly redundant by the 2010s, as most mainstream cable networks were now being broadcast in the format. As such, in 2015, NBC Sports began to use the channel and sister NBCSN as an outlet for the programming of the defunct Universal Sports, consisting mainly of coverage of events in Olympic sports held outside of the Olympic Games.

In 2017, the channel relaunched as Olympic Channel, which continued this focus as a companion to NBCUniversal's broadcast rights to the Olympics; alongside Olympic and Paralympic sports coverage, it also carried documentaries and other programming chronicling the Olympic Games and its history, shoulder programming during the Olympics proper, and coverage of the Paralympic Games since 2018 (alongside NBCSN). In 2021, the channel aired live event coverage during the Olympics for the first (and ultimately, only) time.

On July 1, 2022, NBCUniversal announced that Olympic Channel would be shut down on September 30, 2022, with plans to move its programming to other outlets to be determined. On July 16, 2024, NBCUniversal launched Team USA TV as a FAST channel featuring archival video and interviews.

== History ==
=== As Bravo HD+/Universal HD ===
The channel was launched on July 31, 2003, as Bravo HD+, serving as a high-definition companion service to Bravo, though not a simulcast of its programming. On December 1, 2004, the network was rebranded as Universal HD, shifting its focus towards library content, either filmed in high-definition or remastered into HD, particularly from Universal Pictures, Sony Pictures Television under a syndication agreement, and other NBC Universal channels.

Most of the programs broadcast by Universal HD were first aired by one of NBC Universal's cable networks including Bravo, USA Network, Syfy and Chiller before their HD simulcast networks were launched. In its early years, it carried sports coverage from USA in the HD format, including its rights to the Masters Tournament, tennis's US Open, and the Westminster Kennel Club Dog Show.

The network's original purpose came amid bandwidth constraints that existed at the time, which limited the number of HD channels that television providers could offer to their subscribers. By 2007, however, technological improvements that improved capacity, and the growing amount of HD content, prompted more mainstream cable networks (including NBC Universal's channels) to begin launching their own HD feeds.

To fill its schedule, Universal HD acquired rights to recent post-1999 network series that had been produced in the format, including shows cancelled in their first season, such as CBS's Clubhouse and UPN's Sex, Love & Secrets and South Beach (with the former including the premieres of episodes that had been left unaired after its cancellation by UPN). From August 1 to December 26, 2007, the channel carried a weekly block of programming from then-sister network Sundance Channel, which was sponsored by Microsoft. It also, as part of a consortium of other NBC Universal networks and Sundance Channel, broadcast the entirety of the 2007 Live Earth concerts in high definition.

=== As Olympic Channel ===
In November 2015, Universal Sports, a sports channel owned by InterMedia Partners with a minority stake held by NBC, ceased operations. NBC Sports acquired the rights to the content that was previously held by the channel, which consisted primarily of competitions in Olympic sports, and dispersed across Universal HD, NBCSN, and NBC Sports Live Extra. In June 2017, NBCUniversal announced that Universal HD would be replaced by Olympic Channel on July 15, 2017. The move came in response to changing market conditions in the American television industry, including the growth of "skinny" over-the-top linear television services delivered over the internet, and an overall decline in "niche" channels that originated little to no original programming.

The American version of Olympic Channel was a franchise of the IOC's Olympic Channel network operated in conjunction with NBC Sports and the United States Olympic Committee. The channel carried coverage of competitions in Olympic sports that take place outside of the Olympic Games (such as world championships), and other programming focusing on Olympic athletes. It drew from programming commissioned for the international version of Olympic Channel, original programming produced by the USOC, and the archives of NBC.

The USOC had announced preliminary plans in July 2009 to launch an Olympic sports-oriented channel with Comcast, who would go onto announce its intent to acquire NBC Universal later that year. The joint venture was folded in April 2010, with the planned acquisition of NBC (who ran its own Olympic sport-focused channel with InterMedia Partners, Universal Sports) having been cited as a potential distraction from the proposed channel (which was originally intended to launch following the 2010 Winter Olympics).

The rebranding occurred on the morning of July 15, 2017; its launch weekend programming included coverage of events in the World Aquatics Championships, the Volleyball World Grand Prix, the World Para Athletics Championships and the IAAF Diamond League. Besides Xfinity, providers who carried the channel at launch included Optimum, AT&T U-verse, DirecTV, Dish Network, Spectrum, and Verizon Fios, along with Hulu's live TV service; NBC stated that it would be available in 35 million households when the rebranding occurs.

The network carried news and highlights during the 2018 Winter Olympics (with full event coverage delegated to other NBCUniversal networks), including the Jimmy Roberts-hosted studio program Winter Olympics Daily, the daily medals ceremony, and the Olympic Broadcasting Services (OBS) production Olympic Channel News. The network participated in NBCSN's event coverage of the 2018 Winter Paralympics. Olympic Channel was incorporated into NBC's event coverage of the Olympics for the first time at the 2020 Summer Olympics, airing coverage of the tennis and wrestling competitions, along with a repeating Olympic news feed during non-event hours. It also aired coverage of the 2020 Summer Paralympics alongside NBCSN.

On July 1, 2022, NBCUniversal announced that Olympic Channel would close on September 30, 2022, with a representative stating that the company was "reevaluating our programming distribution strategy regarding the content that currently airs on Olympic Channel". The closing came with NBCUniversal prioritizing its streaming service Peacock, along with the earlier shutdown of NBCSN at the end of 2021 and move of its cable sports properties to USA and CNBC.

On July 16, 2024, ahead of the 2024 Summer Olympics, NBCUniversal launched Team USA TV, a free ad-supported streaming television channel featuring archival footage and interviews from past Olympic Games.

== See also ==
- Olympics on United States television
