= Bill Henry (journalist) =

American journalist

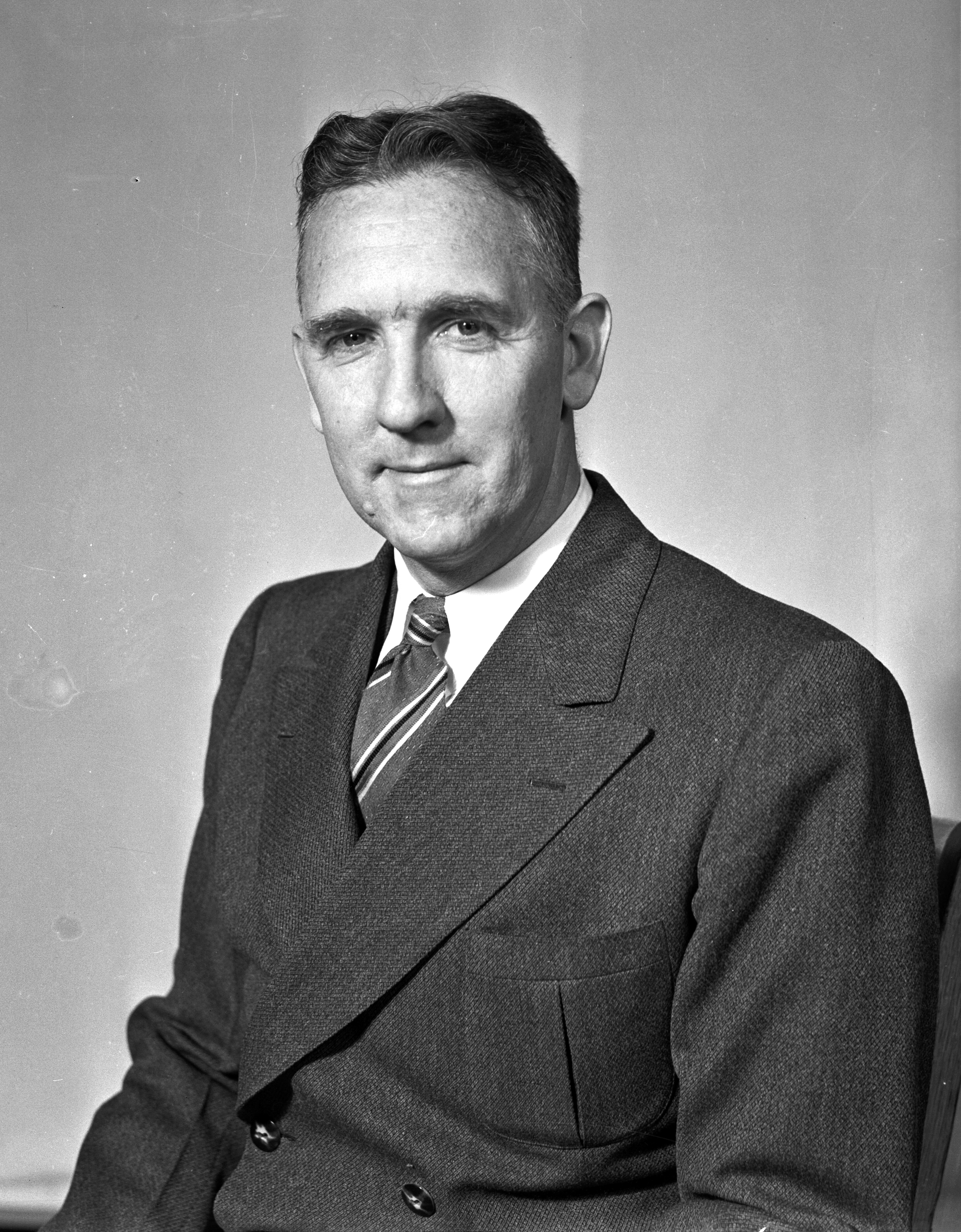
Henry in 1936

William Mellors Henry (August 21, 1890 – April 13, 1970) was an American writer and reporter who lived and worked primarily in Los Angeles, California. He was primarily known for his daily Los Angeles Times column, "By the Way", which appeared from 1939 to 1971. He died nine days before he was to receive the Presidential Medal of Freedom; he was awarded it posthumously.

== Early life ==
Henry was born in San Francisco to Margaret Wendell Henry and Dr. John Quincy Adams ("J.Q.A.") Henry. The family moved to Los Angeles in 1907, where Dr. Henry worked as a temperance advocate and pastor of the First Baptist Church of Los Angeles. Henry graduated from Los Angeles High School in 1909, and accompanied his father on a missionary trip to Australia and New Zealand the following year. He attended the University of Sydney, and eventually enrolled at Occidental College in 1912, playing football and track, and performing in the glee club at Occidental until his graduation in 1914.

== Career ==
In 1912, Henry began reporting on sports for the Los Angeles Times, while at Occidental College.

In 1919, he briefly left his position at the Times and moved his family to Cleveland, where he worked at an aircraft plant with Glenn L. Martin. He was an aviation enthusiast, and assisted Donald Douglas in establishing the Douglas Aircraft Company in Los Angeles in 1920. From 1920–1926, Henry served as editor of Touring Topics, a membership magazine produced by the Automobile Club of Southern California.

Henry worked as a war correspondent for the Times from 1939–1942, and reported on sports, political conventions, and presidential travel as a news broadcaster for Mutual Broadcasting System (MBS), CBS, and NBC throughout his career. He was also the president of the Radio and Television Correspondents' Association (RTCA) from 1947–1948, and chairman of the Political Conventions Committee of the RTCA from 1952–1968.

Henry continued to write for the Times until his death in 1970 at age 80.

== Olympic Games ==
Henry also served as technical director for the 1932 Los Angeles Olympic Games, and authored An Approved History of the Olympic Games (G.P. Putnam's Sons, 1948).

== Personal life ==
Henry married Corinne Stanton in 1914, with whom he fathered three daughters.

Shortly before his death, Henry was announced as a recipient of the Presidential Medal of Freedom, the highest civilian award in the United States. He is a member of the Occidental College Track and Field Hall of Fame.

He died at a hospital in Northridge, California.

== Works ==
- Henry, Bill (1948). An Approved History of the Olympic Games. New York: G. P. Putnam's Sons. OCLC 1023008989. Archived from the original on 2022-07-08. "Sponsored by the Southern California Committee for the Olympic Games"

== Popular culture ==
An Approved History of the Olympic Games inspired David Puttnam to develop the 1981 British historical sports drama film, Chariots of Fire.

== See also ==
- List of Presidential Medal of Freedom recipients

Preceded by Jim McKay	American television prime time anchor, Summer Olympic Games; 1964	Succeeded by Chris Schenkel
