= Jim McKay =

American television sports journalist (1921–2008)

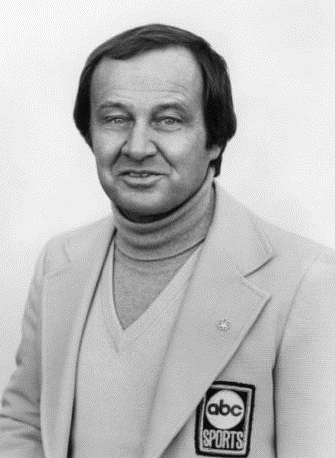
- McKay in the 1970s
- Born: James Kenneth McManus; September 24, 1921; Philadelphia, Pennsylvania, U.S.
- Died: June 7, 2008 (aged 86); Monkton, Maryland, U.S.
- Occupations: Sportscaster, sportswriter, actor
- Years active: 1955–2000; 2002; 2006
- Spouse: Margaret Dempsey (m. 1948)
- Children: Sean and Mary

James Kenneth McManus (September 24, 1921 – June 7, 2008), better known professionally as Jim McKay, was an American television sports journalist.

McKay was best known for hosting ABC's Wide World of Sports (1961–1998). His introduction for that program has passed into American pop culture, in which viewers were reminded of the show's mission ("Spanning the globe to bring you the constant variety of sports") and what lay ahead ("the thrill of victory and the agony of defeat"). He is also known for television coverage of 12 Olympic Games, and is universally respected for his memorable reporting on the Munich massacre at the 1972 Summer Olympics.

McKay covered a wide variety of special events, including the Olympic Games, horse races such as the Kentucky Derby, golf events such as the British Open, and the Indianapolis 500. McKay's son, Sean McManus, a protégé of Roone Arledge is the former chairman of CBS Sports.

== Early life ==
McKay was born in Philadelphia, Pennsylvania, and raised in the Overbrook section of the city in an Irish American Catholic family. He attended Our Lady of Lourdes Grade School and Saint Joseph's Preparatory School. When McKay was 14, he and his family moved to Baltimore, Maryland, where he attended Loyola High School (now Loyola Blakefield). He received a bachelor's degree from Loyola College in Maryland in 1943. During World War II, he served in the United States Navy as the captain of a minesweeper.

In 1946, McKay returned to Baltimore and took a position with The Evening Sun as a police reporter. He was promoted to aviation reporter instead of getting a raise. During this time, he also met Margaret Dempsey, his future wife.

== Television ==
In 1947, McKay gave up his job as a reporter for The Evening Sun to join that same organization's new TV station WMAR-TV. His was the first voice ever heard on television in Baltimore. McKay remained with the station until 1950. In January and February 1950, McKay broadcast the first-ever televised network college basketball games for CBS, calling seven games featuring Navy in Annapolis, Maryland, using his birth name, Jim McManus. Later in 1950 with CBS he hosted a variety show, called The Real McKay, which necessitated the changing of his on-air surname. From 1958 to 1960, McKay served as host and commentator on the CBS television daytime program The Verdict Is Yours. Through the 1950s, sports commentary became more and more his primary assignment for CBS. In 1956-57, McKay teamed with Chris Schenkel to call CBS telecasts of New York Giants football. He was originally tabbed to be the lead broadcaster of the network's coverage of the 1960 Winter Olympics, but had to be replaced by Walter Cronkite after suffering a mental breakdown. McKay recovered in time to host the 1960 Summer Olympics from the CBS Television studio in Grand Central Terminal and ultimately covered a total of 12 Olympic Games. He had a six-episode stint as host of the game show Make the Connection on NBC in 1955.

McKay moved on to ABC in 1961, and was the host of ABC's influential Wide World of Sports for 37 years.

McKay was known to motor-racing fans as the host of the ABC's annual delayed telecast of the Indianapolis 500. Over the years, McKay worked with race drivers in commentary, including triple Formula One World Champion Jackie Stewart, triple Indianapolis 500 winner Bobby Unser, and Sam Posey.

While covering the Munich massacre at the 1972 Summer Olympics for ABC, McKay took on the job of reporting the events live on his only scheduled day off during the Games, substituting for Chris Schenkel. He was on air for fourteen hours without a break, during a sixteen-hour broadcast. After an unsuccessful rescue attempt of the athletes held hostage, at 3:24 a.m. Central European Time, McKay came on the air with this statement:

When I was a kid my father used to say "Our greatest hopes and our worst fears are seldom realized." Our worst fears have been realized tonight. They have now said there were 11 hostages; two were killed in their rooms this morn-- yesterday morning, nine were killed at the airport tonight. They're all gone.

— McKay, 1972

Although McKay received numerous accolades for his reporting of the Munich hostage crisis (including two Emmy Awards, one for sports and one for news reporting), he stated in a 2003 HBO documentary about his life and career that he was most proud of a telegram he received from Walter Cronkite the day after the massacre praising his work.

McKay also hosted from the studio the 1980 Winter Olympics in Lake Placid, New York. A happier result came when the U.S. hockey team defeated the Soviet Union in the Miracle on Ice. During the broadcast wrap-up after the game, McKay compared the American upset victory to a group of Canadian college football players defeating the Pittsburgh Steelers (the recent Super Bowl champions at the height of their dynasty).

In 1994, McKay was the studio host for the FIFA World Cup coverage, the first ever held on American soil. McKay also covered the 2006 FIFA World Cup for ABC. In 2002, ABC "loaned" McKay to NBC to serve as a special correspondent during the Winter Olympic Games in Salt Lake City. In 2003, HBO released a documentary by McKay called Jim McKay: My World in My Words, tracing his career and outlining McKay's personal and professional accomplishments.

== Film ==
McKay appears in the 1999 film One Day in September and in the 2024 film September 5 through archive footage of the Munich massacre at the 1972 Summer Olympics.

== Personal life ==
An avid horse racing enthusiast who raised thoroughbreds, McKay founded Maryland Million Day, a series of twelve races designed to promote Maryland's horse breeding industry. The day-long program has grown to become a major racing event in the state of Maryland, second only to the Preakness Stakes day at Pimlico Race Course. It has spawned more than twenty other similar events at United States race tracks such as the Sunshine Millions.

McKay and his wife purchased a minority share in the Baltimore Orioles in 1993. He participated in the effort to bring the 2012 Summer Olympics to Baltimore and Washington.

In 1995, McKay had heart surgery and was forced to miss the Preakness Stakes.

McKay died on June 7, 2008, from natural causes at age 86. He was survived by his wife Margaret, son Sean, daughter Mary Guba, and three grandchildren. McKay died on the same day as the running of the Belmont Stakes (won by Da'Tara that year, with Denis of Cork placing second).

== Honors ==
- McKay won numerous awards, including the George Polk Award for his sports and news coverage of the 1972 Munich Olympics.
- McKay was the first sportscaster to win an Emmy Award and won thirteen Emmys in his lifetime.
- 1987: American Sportscasters Association Hall of Fame, inducted along with veteran boxing and horse racing announcer Clem McCarthy.
- 1988: U.S. Olympic Hall of Fame.
- 1993: TV Guide named McKay the best sportscaster of the 1970s.
- 2001: Paul White Award, Radio Television Digital News Association
- McKay was inducted into the Television Hall of Fame during its 11th induction.
- McKay was selected as the inaugural Dick Schaap Award for Outstanding Journalism recipient in 2002.
- The NBC broadcast of the 2008 Summer Olympics opening ceremony was dedicated to McKay, per a message at the closing of the broadcast.
- The National Collegiate Athletic Association has dedicated a scholarship for college athletes for postgraduate study in McKay's honor.
- The Armory in New York City dedicated a high school track meet in his name on December 12, 2008.

Preceded by Chris Schenkel	Television voice of the Indianapolis 500; 1967–1974	Succeeded by Keith Jackson
Preceded by Keith Jackson	Television voice of the Indianapolis 500; 1976–1985	Succeeded by Jim Lampley
Preceded by None; Chris Schenkel; Bryant Gumbel	American television prime time anchor, Summer Olympics; 1960; 1976; 1984	Succeeded by Bill Henry; Bryant Gumbel; Bryant Gumbel
Preceded by Walter Cronkite; Curt Gowdy	American television prime time anchor, Winter Olympics; 1964; 1976–1988	Succeeded by Chris Schenkel; Tim McCarver and Paula Zahn
Preceded by Ernie Johnson Jr.	U.S. World Cup Television Studio Host; 1994	Succeeded by Brent Musburger
Preceded by First	ABC's Wide World of Sports host 1961–1986	Succeeded by Frank Gifford and Becky Dixon
