= Universal Sports =

American sports cable television channel

- Country: United States
- Broadcast area: Nationwide
- Headquarters: Woodland Hills, California

Programming
- Language: English
- Picture format: 480i (SDTV)

Ownership
- Owner: InterMedia Partners (92%); NBC Sports Group (8%)

History
- Launched: 2006; 19 years ago
- Closed: November 16, 2015; 10 years ago
- Replaced by: Olympic Channel (2017; Universal HD carried existing contracts between 2015–2017)
- Former names: World Championship Sports Network (2006–2008)

Universal Sports was an American sports-oriented digital cable and satellite television network. It was owned as a joint venture between InterMedia Partners (which owned a controlling 92% interest) and NBCUniversal (which owned the remaining 8%).

== History ==
=== World Championship Sports Network ===
The channel was launched in 2006 as World Championship Sports Network (WCSN); it was co-founded by Claude Ruibal (who served as its chairman and chief executive officer) and Tom Hipkins (who served as a member of the channel's board of directors), with the help of Carlos Silva (its president and chief operating officer). One of the first events broadcast by WCSN was coverage of the United States Track and Field Championships via streaming video.

In 2007, InterMedia Partners gained a majority ownership interest in the network. By March 2008, WCSN began to be carried on broadcast television, through the digital subchannels of several stations owned by the Granite Broadcasting Corporation.

=== Universal Sports ===
NBCUniversal entered into a partnership with InterMedia in which the former acquired a minority interest in the channel; in addition, on June 16, 2008, the network was rebranded as Universal Sports, incorporating a new logo with the NBC peacock. By November 2008, all 10 of NBC's owned-and-operated stations had begun carrying the network on one of their digital subchannels. Universal Sports offered carriage on broadcast stations on a channel lease basis until 2011, with the provision that the stations strike deals with cable providers in their markets to carry the network by January 31, 2009. If a station failed to obtain cable carriage, the network had the right to move its affiliation to another station in that market that would be able to gain cable carriage. The network was being shopped to NBC-affiliated stations until December 1.

On June 17, 2010, Universal Sports, along with the International Rugby Board, announced that the channel would bring "unprecedented national television and digital media coverage of the 2011 and 2015 Rugby World Cup tournaments."

On October 22, 2015, it was announced that Universal Sports would shut down on November 16, 2015, and that NBC Sports would inherit the network's portfolio of sports rights for its own networks (such as NBC, NBCSN and Universal HD). The channel shut down at 6AM on that day; with the documentary "5 Peaks in a Day from Switzerland" being the network's last program. On July 1, 2017, the United States Olympic Committee and the NBC Sports Group launched the Olympic Channel, effectively serving as Universal Sports' eventual replacement channel.

=== Carriage ===
On June 15, 2011, DirecTV added Universal Sports as a national basic channel. The carriage agreement with DirecTV led NBCUniversal and InterMedia to announce on September 12, 2011, that it would transition Universal Sports into a cable- and satellite-exclusive service (effectively dropping its over-the-air affiliates) by January 2012. On January 1, 2012, Universal Sports was dropped by most cable providers as a result of a protracted battle to get them to offer the service as a premium channel. One of the providers to drop the channel was Comcast, the nation's largest cable company and part-owner of Universal Sports' co-parent NBCUniversal at the time (it would later acquire the remaining ownership interest held by General Electric in 2013).

== Programming ==
The channel had long-term broadcasting agreements with the International Association of Athletics Federations (IAAF), the International Cycling Union (UCI), the International Federation of Gymnastics (FIG), the International Rowing Federation (FISA), the International Ski Federation (FIS), the International Swimming Federation (FINA), and the International Rugby Board (IRB).

The channel provided year-round coverage of events that generally receive attention every few years. Through television carriage and internet streaming, viewers were provided an in-depth look at how Olympic athletes compete between the games. Universal Sports promoted itself as "the athlete's network," and extended its coverage through blogs and interviews outside of competition. As reported by Olympic news outlet Around the Rings, Universal Sports and Infront Sports and Media announced an exclusive media rights agreement for the International Ski Federation World Cup events beginning with the 2011–2012 season.
