= CBS Olympic broadcasts =

Broadcasts of the Olympic Games on CBS in the United States

- The Olympics on CBS logo from their Winter Olympics coverage during the 1990s.
- Genre: Olympics telecasts
- Country of origin: United States
- Original language: English
- No. of seasons: 2 (1960s version); 3 (1990s version); 5 (total)

Production
- Production location: Various Olympic Games sites
- Camera setup: Multi-camera
- Running time: Varies
- Production company: CBS Sports

Original release
- Network: CBS
- Release: February 18 – September 11, 1960
- Release: February 8, 1992 – February 22, 1998

Related
- NBC (1964–1972; 1988–present); ABC (1964–1988)

The CBS television network aired the first live telecast of the Olympic Games on American television, the 1960 Winter Olympics. The network has since aired the 1960 Summer Olympics; and the Winter Games in 1992, 1994, and 1998.

== History ==
=== 1960s coverage ===
The first live telecast of the Olympics on American television was from the 1960 Winter Olympics in Squaw Valley, California (now Olympic Valley). CBS paid $50,000 to obtain the broadcast rights. Walter Cronkite hosted the telecasts, anchoring on-site from Squaw Valley. With Squaw Valley connected to the network lines, some events were broadcast live while the remainder of CBS's coverage was of events shown on the same day they took place. During the games, officials asked Tony Verna, one of the members of the production staff, if it could use its videotape equipment to determine whether or not a slalom skier missed a gate. Verna then returned to CBS headquarters in New York City and developed the first instant replay system, which debuted at the Army–Navy football game in 1963. CBS did not broadcast another Winter Olympics after Squaw Valley until 1992.

Later that year, CBS aired the 1960 Summer Olympics from Rome, the only time that CBS has ever televised a Summer Games event. CBS carried about 20 hours of coverage of such events as track and field and swimming. Because communications satellites, which would have provided direct transmissions between the United States and Italy, were not yet available, production staff members fed footage from Rome to London, re-recorded it on tape there, and then the tapes were flown to CBS headquarters in New York (or a mobile unit parked at Idelwild Airport in New York, to lessen the time that transporting videotapes into the city would take) for later telecast.

Despite this, at least some of the events, especially those held in the morning and early-afternoon (local time in Rome), actually aired in the United States the same day they took place (often during a half-hour late-night show that aired from 11:15 to 11:45 p.m. Eastern Time). Jim McKay, then a relatively unknown radio and television personality, was the host, anchoring not from Rome, but from the CBS studios in New York City.

=== 1990s coverage ===
Although CBS bid on the rights to several Olympics in the 1970s and 1980s, CBS was outbid by rivals NBC and ABC. When the 1990s approached, CBS won the rights to three consecutive Winter Games: 1992, 1994 and 1998.

On May 24, 1988, CBS won the broadcasting rights to the 1992 Winter Olympics from Albertville, France after bidding around $243 million. On August 23, 1989, CBS also won the rights to broadcast the 1994 Winter Olympics from Lillehammer, Norway after bidding $300 million. Finally, on January 18, 1994, won the rights to broadcast the 1998 Winter Olympics from Nagano, Japan, after paying approximately $375 million.

CBS provided the live coverage of the 1992 Winter Games in Albertville, France on weekend mornings and afternoons (and on the last Friday morning (Eastern Time) of the Games to show live the men's ice hockey semifinal between the United States and Unified Team, but most of the events (and all of the prime time coverage) were broadcast by CBS on tape delay, owing to the time difference between the United States and Europe. A similar format was used in 1994 when the Winter Games were rescheduled to occur midway between Summer Olympics rather than in the same year.

The 1994 Winter Games in Lillehammer, Norway saw the highest nighttime ratings in the history of American Olympic telecasts, as a result of the scandal in which associates of figure skater Tonya Harding attacked Nancy Kerrigan and the media frenzy that followed. The short program in women's figure skating, which aired on February 23 is, as of 2008, the sixth-highest rated prime time television program in American history. It had a rating of 48.5 and a share of 64 (meaning 48.5% of all television sets in the U.S. and 64% of all television sets turned on were tuned in to CBS). The long program two days later had a rating of 44.1 and another 64 share; it ranks 32nd. Both the short and long programs aired on tape delay during prime time, roughly six hours after the events occurred.

Also contributing to the huge ratings in 1994 were a surprise gold medal by American skier Tommy Moe, as well as Dan Jansen's speed skating gold medal win, and, on the final morning (Eastern Time) of the Games, a dramatic championship game in men's hockey between Sweden and Canada, won by Sweden in a shootout. During the 1992 construction of the Lysgårdsbakken jumping hills, they were moved several meters north to accommodate CBS and other broadcasters' preferred camera angles.

The affiliation switches that followed the 1994 games resulted in several CBS affiliates losing their network affiliation to Fox and NBC, the latter of which began broadcasting the Winter Olympics in 2002. The affiliation deal between CBS and Westinghouse Broadcasting resulted in WBAL-TV, WHDH and WCAU switching to NBC in 1995, one year before those stations aired the 1996 Summer games.

The 1998 Winter Games in Nagano, Japan did feature some live prime time coverage in the Eastern and Central Time Zones (the Opening Ceremony and some alpine skiing events), since these events were being held in the morning local time in Japan, which corresponded to the prime time slot in the United States. Much of the men's and women's hockey action was held in the early afternoon (during late night in the Eastern Time Zone, allowing again for live broadcasts at 12:30 a.m. Eastern Time), however figure skating was shown on delay about 20 hours after the competitions took place so they could air in prime time.

Each telecast had a different prime time host(s): Paula Zahn and Tim McCarver in 1992, Greg Gumbel in 1994, and Jim Nantz in 1998. CBS' theme music for their Olympic coverage was composed by Tamara Kline.

In 2011, CBS Sports president Sean McManus said the option to bid for the 2014 Winter Olympics or 2016 Summer Olympics "is not a priority of ours right now."

== Hours of coverage ==
Year	Host	Hours of Coverage
1960 Winter	Squaw Valley, United States	15
1960 Summer	Rome, Italy	20
1992 Winter	Albertville, France	116
1994 Winter	Lillehammer, Norway	119.5
1998 Winter	Nagano, Japan	123.8

== See also ==
- ABC Olympic broadcasts
- NBC Olympic broadcasts
- TNT Olympic broadcasts
- Olympics on television

== Notes ==
Preceded by First Winter Olympics to be broadcast	U.S. Winter Olympics Broadcaster; CBS Sports; Olympics on CBS (1960)	Succeeded by ABC (1964-1968)
Preceded by ABC (1976-1988)	U.S. Winter Olympics Broadcaster; CBS Sports/Turner Sports; Olympics on CBS/TNT (1992-1998)	Succeeded by NBC (2002-present)
Preceded by First Summer Olympics to be broadcast	U.S. Summer Olympics Broadcaster; CBS Sports; Olympics on CBS (1960)	Succeeded by NBC (1964)
