= TNT Olympic broadcasts =

US television program

The American cable channel TNT served as cable partner for the CBS broadcast television network during the 1992, 1994, and 1998 Winter Olympic Games, supplementing Olympics coverage in the United States.

== History ==
While CBS was the American over-the-air television broadcaster for the 1992, 1994, and 1998 Winter Games, cable coverage was supplemented by TNT. The 1992 Winter Olympics in Albertville gave TNT 50 hours of programming in exchange for $50 million towards rights fees. This in return, allowed CBS to reduce their financial outlay by joining forces with TNT. TNT aired events under the promotional slogan "The ultimate daytime drama." Nick Charles and Fred Hickman hosted the coverage from Turner's Atlanta studios in 1992 and 1994, while Jim Lampley was the host in 1998.

== See also ==
- NFL on TNT - TNT's coverage of the National Football League featured many personalities who worked for CBS at the same time
- NCAA March Madness (TV program) - CBS/TNT co-produced coverage of the NCAA Division I men's basketball tournament

Preceded by ABC (1976–1988)	U.S. Winter Olympics Broadcaster; CBS Sports/Turner Sports; Olympics on CBS/TNT (1992-1998)	Succeeded by NBC (2002–present)
