= List of Summer Olympic documentary films =

The Summer Olympic Games have been filmed and competition highlights released starting in 1906. Documentary films for individual Summer Olympic Games which feature actual competition footage are listed in the following table.

== Background ==
An Olympic Film Collection of the International Olympic Committee (IOC) Olympic Foundation for Culture and Heritage (OFCH) includes fifty feature-length films providing a chronicle of the modern Olympic Games. A collection of many Official films was restored, and released as a 2017 home video box set under the title 100 Years of Olympic Films: 1912–2012. “Official” films are those which have been arranged by the host city organizing committee and produced in compliance with the charter. Listed Olympiad numbers have discontinuities due to cancelled games.

Other than still photography, no Olympic competitions were filmed prior to 1906.

== Summer Olympic documentary films ==
#	Games	Film title	Released	Director	Notes
-	Athens 1906	Jeux olympiques d'Athènes	1906	Pathé Frères	
4	London 1908	Olympic Games In London	1908	British Pathé	Film ID:1824.12
5	Stockholm 1912	The Games of the V Olympiad Stockholm, 1912	1912	Adrian Wood	
7	Antwerp 1920	Olympiade in Antwerpen	1920		
8	Paris 1924	The Olympic Games in Paris, 1924	1924	Jean de Rovéra	
9	Amsterdam 1928	The Olympic Games, Amsterdam 1928	1928	Wilhelm Prager, Jules Perel	
9	Amsterdam 1928	The IX Olympiad in Amsterdam	1928	Istituto Luce	
10	Los Angeles 1932	1932 Olympic Games	1932	Pathé News	
10	Los Angeles 1932	Fox Movietone News #92-95	1932	Edmund Reek	
10	Los Angeles 1932	Hearst Metrotone News #290-293	1932	Hearst Metrotone News	
10	Los Angeles 1932	Paramount News #1-4	1932	Paramount News	
10	Los Angeles 1932	Universal Newspaper Newsreel #64-67	1932	Universal Newsreel	
11	Berlin 1936	Olympia	1938	Leni Riefenstahl	
14	London 1948	XIVth Olympiad: The Glory of Sport	1948	Castleton Knight	joint film also covering the 1948 Winter Olympics
15	Helsinki 1952	Olympia 52	1952	Chris Marker	
15	Helsinki 1952	Where the World Meets	1952	Hannu Leminen	Official
15	Helsinki 1952	Gold and Glory	1953	Hannu Leminen	Official
16	Melbourne 1956	Olympic Games 1956	1956	Peter Whitchurch	
16	Melbourne 1956	Freedom's Fury	2006	Colin Keith Gray, Megan Raney Aarons	
17	Rome 1960	The Grand Olympics	1961	Romolo Marcellini	
18	Tokyo 1964	Tokyo Olympiad	1965	Kon Ichikawa	
19	Mexico 1968	The Olympics in Mexico	1969	Alberto Isaac	
19	Mexico 1968	Salute	2008	Matt Norman	
20	Munich 1972	Visions of Eight	1973	Miloš Forman, Kon Ichikawa, Claude Lelouch, Yuri Ozerov, Arthur Penn, Michael Pfleghar, John Schlesinger, Mai Zetterling	
20	Munich 1972	One Day in September	1999	Kevin Macdonald	
21	Montreal 1976	Games of the XXI Olympiad	1977	Jean Beaudin, Marcel Carrière, Georges Dufaux	
21	Montreal 1976	The Last Gold	2016	Brian Brown	
22	Moscow 1980	O Sport, You Are Peace!	1981	Yuri Ozerov	
23	Los Angeles 1984	16 Days of Glory	1986	Bud Greenspan	
24	Seoul 1988	Seoul 1988	1988	Lee Kwang-Soo	
25	Barcelona 1992	Marathon	1993	Carlos Saura	
26	Atlanta 1996	Atlanta's Olympic Glory	1997	Bud Greenspan	
27	Sydney 2000	Sydney 2000, Stories of Olympic Glory	2001	Bud Greenspan	
28	Athens 2004	Bud Greenspan's Athens 2004: Stories of Olympic Glory	2005	Bud Greenspan	
29	Beijing 2008	The Everlasting Flame	2010	Gu Jun	
30	London 2012	First	2012	Caroline Rowland	
30	London 2012	Gun to Tape	2012	David Forbes	
31	Rio 2016	Days of Truce	2017	Breno Silveira	
32	Tokyo 2020	Side A, Side B	2022	Naomi Kawase	
33	Paris 2024	Personal Best	2025	Ady Walter, Amal Doghmi	

== See also ==
- List of Winter Olympic documentary films
- Olympics on television
- List of FIFA World Cup official films
