= Olympics on television =

International television broadcasts

The Olympic Games have been broadcast on television since the 1936 Summer Olympics.

== 1930s ==
=== 1936 Summer Olympics ===
The 1936 games, held in Berlin, Germany, were televised by means of closed-circuit television to various viewing halls. Broadcasts of the Games were made available in more than two dozen halls in Berlin, Leipzig and Potsdam and the Olympic village.

== 1940s ==
=== 1948 Summer Olympics ===
The BBC provided coverage of the 1948 Summer Olympics on their television service, live from Wembley Stadium and the Empire Pool. Coverage was mainly limited to the London area, but could be picked up as far away as the Channel Islands in certain conditions.

== 1950s ==
=== 1956 Summer Olympics ===
Television service was introduced to Australia in time for the 1956 Games in Melbourne. International broadcasting institutions present were BBC, CBS, NBC, Eurovision and United Press. These Games were the first time broadcasting rights were sold.

=== 1956 Winter Games ===
RAI introduced the first Winter Games coverage ever, and the first Olympic one extended to an international audience. The broadcasts were relayed live via Eurovision to Austria, Belgium, Denmark, France, West Germany, Luxembourg, the Netherlands, the United Kingdom and Switzerland.

== 1960s ==
=== UK coverage ===
The BBC continued to cover the Olympics for the United Kingdom into the 1960s and have covered every summer and winter Olympics since. They were joined by ITV in 1968, in addition to also covering the Games in 1972, 1980 and 1988 alongside to the BBC. ITV skipped 1976 after having a suggestion for German-style alternating coverage turned down by the BBC, and an industrial dispute prevented coverage of the 1984 Los Angeles Olympics. The Games returned to ITV screens in 1988, sharing their coverage with Channel 4, who showed overnight and breakfast coverage with ITV covering the daytime action as well as broadcasting early evening highlights programmes. The 1988 Olympics were the last time that the Games have been shown on ITV with subsequent Olympic Games being shown only on the BBC. ITV only broadcast the Winter Olympics in 1968.

=== 1960 Winter Games ===
CBS paid $50,000 for the right to broadcast the games in the United States, and this marked the first time the Olympic Games were televised there. Also, officials, unsure if a skier had missed a gate in the men's slalom, asked CBS if they could review a videotape of the race. This would be the impetus and inspiration for CBS to develop what would come to be known as "instant replay."

=== 1960 Summer Olympics ===
CBS paid $394,000 ($3.28 million in 2025) for the exclusive rights to broadcast the Games in the United States. This was the first Summer Olympic games to be telecast in North America. In addition to CBS in the United States, the Olympics were telecast for the first time in Canada (on CBC Television), in Mexico (through the networks of Telesistema Mexicano) and in the Philippines (through RPN-9). Since television broadcast satellites were still two years into the future, CBS, CBC, and TSM shot and edited videotapes in Rome, fed the tapes to Paris where they were re-recorded onto other tapes, which were then loaded onto jet planes to North America. Planes carrying the tapes landed at Idlewild Airport in New York City, where mobile units fed the tapes to CBS, to Toronto for the CBC, and to Mexico City for Televisa. Despite this arrangement, many daytime events were broadcast in North America, especially on CBS and CBC, the same day they took place. Television was broadcast live in Europe (including the UK) via the Eurovision television network

=== 1964 Summer Olympics ===
The Tokyo 1964 games were the first to be telecast internationally. The games were telecast to the United States using Syncom 3, the first geostationary communication satellite, and from there to Europe using Relay 1, an older satellite which allowed only 15–20 minutes of broadcast during each of its orbits. Total broadcast time of programs delivered via satellite was 5 hours 41 minutes in the United States, 12 hours 27 minutes in Europe, and 14 hours 18 minutes in Canada. Pictures were received via satellite in the United States, Canada, and 21 countries in Europe. Several broadcasters recorded some sports from Japan and flown over to their countries.

TRANSPAC-1, the first trans-Pacific communications cable from Japan to Hawaii was also finished in June 1964 in time for these games. Before this, most communications from Japan to other countries were via shortwave.

=== 1968 Winter Games ===
Frenchman Jean-Claude Killy won three gold medals in all the alpine skiing events. In women's figure skating, Peggy Fleming won the only United States gold medal. The games have been credited with making the Winter Olympics more popular in the United States, not least of which because of ABC's extensive coverage of Fleming and Killy, who became overnight sensations among teenage girls.

== 1970s ==
=== 1972 Summer Olympics ===
==== Munich massacre ====
Initial news reports, published all over the world, indicated that all the hostages were alive, and that all the terrorists had been killed. Only later did a representative for the International Olympic Committee (IOC) suggest that "initial reports were overly optimistic." Jim McKay, who was covering the Olympics that year for ABC, had taken on the job of reporting the events as Roone Arledge fed them into his earpiece. At 3:24 A.M. (German Time), McKay received the official confirmation:

When I was a kid, my father used to say, 'Our greatest hopes and our worst fears are seldom realized.' Our worst fears have been realized tonight. They’ve now said that there were eleven hostages. Two were killed in their rooms yesterday morning, nine were killed at the airport tonight. They’re all gone.

== 1980s ==
=== 1980 Winter Games ===
==== Miracle on Ice ====
The rest of the United States (except those who watched the game live on Canadian television) would have to wait to see the game, as ABC decided to broadcast the late-afternoon game on tape delay in prime time.

Though the game was on live television in the Soviet Union, it was played at 1:00 AM Moscow time. This afforded CPSU officials some ability to squelch news and discussion; Pravda did not carry a game report or mention the match in its post-Olympic wrap-up, and the hockey players were quickly and quietly herded away from the arrival reception for Olympic athletes at Moscow's airport.

=== 1980 Summer Olympics ===
Major broadcasters of the games were USSR State TV and Radio (1,370 accreditation cards), Eurovision (31 countries, 818 cards) and Intervision (11 countries, 342 cards). Asahi TV with 68 cards provided coverage for Japan, while OTI representing the Spanish-speaking world received 59 cards, TVNZ (New Zealand) was aired live and the Channel Seven provided coverage for Australia (48 cards). NBC, which had intended to be another major broadcaster, canceled its coverage in response to the U.S. boycott of the 1980 Summer Olympics, and became a minor broadcaster with 56 accreditation cards, although the network did air highlights and recaps of the games on a regular basis. The Canadian Broadcasting Corporation almost canceled their plans for coverage after Canada took part in the boycott and was represented by 9 cards.

The television centre used 20 TV channels. Montreal had used 16, Munich 12, Mexico City 7.

=== 1984 Summer Olympics ===
The price for ABC's 180 hours of television was $225 million. All Los Angeles radio and television stations covered the Olympics extensively throughout the event. The Summer broadcast rights almost tripled from 1980 to 1984 ($87 million to $225 million) and both Winter and Summer rights have gone for $300 million or more since 1988.

=== 1988 Winter Olympics ===
The American host network, ABC, paid a then record US$309 million, while the main host broadcaster, the Canadian CTV television network, won the domestic rights for CA$4.5 million. A further $90 million was raised by sponsorships and licenses.

=== 1988 Summer Olympics ===
The games were covered by the following broadcasters:

- Argentina: Argentina Televisora Color, Canal 13, Canal 11
- Australia: Network Ten
- Bolivia: TVB, UNITEL
- Brazil: Rede Globo, Rede Manchete, SBT, TVE Brasil, Rede Record and Rede Bandeirantes
- Brunei: RTB Channel 5 and RTB Channel 8
- Canada: CBC
- Chile: TVN, UCTV
- China: CCTV
- Colombia: Inravisión (Cadena Uno: RTI, PUNCH, Caracol, JES, RCN & Datos y Mensajes)
- East Germany : DFF
- France: TF1
- Hong Kong: ATV and TVB
- Hungary: Magyar Televízió
- India: Doordarshan
- Indonesia: TVRI Jakarta
- Ireland: RTÉ
- Italy: RAI
- Japan: Japan Consortium
- Macau: TDM
- Malaysia: RTM TV1 and STMB TV3
- Mexico: Televisa
- Netherlands: NPO
- New Zealand: TVNZ
- Norway: NRK
- Peru: Stereo 33
- Philippines: PTV-4
- Poland: TVP
- Portugal: RTP
- Puerto Rico: WAPA-TV
- Romania: TVR
- Singapore: SBC Channel 12
- South Korea: KBS and MBC
- Soviet Union: CT-USSR
- Spain: TVE
- Sweden: SVT
- Taiwan (as Chinese Taipei): TTV, CTV and CTS
- Thailand: National Television Thailand
- Turkey: TRT
- United Kingdom: BBC and ITV/Channel 4
- United States: NBC
- Venezuela: Venevision
- West Germany: ARD and ZDF

== 1990s ==
=== 1992 Winter Olympics ===
CBS televised the Winter Olympics from Albertville, France, for the first time since 1960, while US cable broadcaster Turner Network Television televises the Games for the first time in its history.

=== 1992 Summer Olympics ===
The exploding costs of the Games sent networks looking for alternative strategies to ease the financial burden. In 1992, NBC made an attempt at utilizing pay-per-view subscriptions with the "Olympic Triplecast", which was organized in conjunction with Cablevision and intended to sell packages of commercial-free, extensive programming.

NBC, which had the broadcast rights to the games, partnered with Cablevision for the experiment, believing that people would pay between $95 and $170 to see events live that would normally be shown on tape delay on the network in prime time. By the time the games began, relatively few people had ordered the package, which featured Red, White and Blue channels on a special three-button remote control offered by some cable operators for free as a lure to sign up for the service.

The plan was a failure, mainly due to viewers' reluctance to pay to see some events when network coverage of others was free of charge. NBC and Cablevision would lose millions of dollars, with one estimate putting their losses at $100 million.

The games were covered by the following broadcasters:

- Algeria: ENTV
- Argentina: Channel 20, América TV, Telefe Channel 13
- Australia: Seven Network
- Austria: ORF
- Belarus: btv
- Belgium: BRTN, RTBF
- Brazil: Rede Bandeirantes, Rede Globo, SBT, Rede Manchete, TopSport
- Bulgaria: BNT
- Canada: CTV, TVA
- China: CCTV
- Chile: Channel 13, TVN
- Colombia: Canal A
- Croatia: HRT
- Cuba: ICRT
- Cyprus: CyBC
- Czechoslovakia: ČST
- Denmark: DR
- Egypt: ERTU
- Estonia: ETV
- Finland: Yle
- France: Antenne 2, FR3, TF1, Canal+
- Germany: ARD, RTL, ZDF
- Greece:
- Hong Kong: TVB (Cantonese & English), STAR TV (Chinese & English)
- Hungary: MTV
- Iceland: RÚV
- India: Doordarshan
- Indonesia: TVRI, RCTI, SCTV
- Iran: Islamic Republic of Iran Broadcasting
- Ireland: RTÉ
- Israel: IBA
- Italy: RAI
- Japan: Japan Consortium
- Jordan: JRTV
- Lebanon: Télé Liban
- Libya: LJBC
- Lithuania: LTV
- Luxembourg: RTL
- Macau: TDM, STAR TV (Chinese & English)
- Malaysia: RTM (TV1 & TV2), STMB (TV3)
- Malta: MBA
- Mexico: Televisa
- Monaco: RMC
- Mongolia: MNB
- Morocco: RTM
- Netherlands: NOS
- New Zealand: TVNZ
- Norway: NRK
- Pakistan: PTV
- Philippines: ABS-CBN
- Poland: TVP
- Portugal: RTP
- Puerto Rico: WIPR
- Romania: RTP
- Russia: Public Russian Television, VGTRK Olympiade
- Singapore: SBC Channel 12
- Slovenia: RTVSLO
- South Africa: SABC
- South Korea: KBS (KBS 1TV), SBS, MBC
- Spain: TVE
- Sweden: SVT
- Switzerland: SRG SSR, TSI
- Taiwan: TTV, CTV, CTS
- Thailand: Channel 3, Channel 5, Channel 7, Channel 9, Television Thailand Channel 11
- Tunisia: ERTT
- Turkey: TRT
- United Kingdom: BBC
- United States: NBC, Cablevision
- Venezuela: Venevisión

=== 1994 Winter Games ===
When the construction of the Lysgårdsbakkene jumping hills started in 1992, the hills had to be moved some meters north so that the American broadcaster CBS could get the best pictures available from their pre-chosen location. CBS became the largest source of revenue for the hosts.

=== 1996 Summer Olympics ===
For Atlanta 1996, NBC bought the broadcasting rights for US$456 million. The European Broadcasting Union paid US$240 million for broadcasting rights.

Other broadcasters included:

- Brazil: Rede Globo, Rede Manchete, Rede Bandeirantes, Rede Record, SBT, CNT, TVE Brasil, ESPN Brasil, PSN Brasil
- China: CCTV
- Canada: CBC
- France: TF1, FTV, Eurosport
- Germany: ARD, ZDF
- India: Doordarshan
- Indonesia: TVRI, RCTI, SCTV, Anteve and Indosiar
- Italy: RAI
- Japan: Japan Consortium
- Malaysia: RTM
- Philippines: PTV
- Russia: Public Russian Television, VGTRK Olympiade
- Singapore: Singapore Television Twelve
- South Korea: KBS, MBC, SBS
- United Kingdom: BBC
- United States: NBC, MSNBC and CNBC

=== 1998 Winter Games ===
The Nagano 1998 Games were covered by the following broadcasters:

- Asia: ABU, ATV
- Australia: Seven Network
- Canada: CBC
- China: CCTV
- Europe: EBU, Eurosport
- Finland: YLE
- Germany: ARD, ZDF
- Italy: RAI
- Jamaica CVM TV
- Japan: Japan Consortium
- Malaysia: Astro
- Norway: NRK
- North Africa: URTNA
- New Zealand: TVNZ
- Sub-Saharan Africa: SuperSport
- South Africa:
- South Korea: MBC
- South America: OTI
- Sweden: SVT
- Ukraine: NTU
- United States: CBS, Turner Broadcasting
- United Kingdom: BBC

== 2000s ==
=== 2000 Summer Olympics ===
Most of the footage used by international broadcasters of the Opening and Closing Ceremony was directed out of SOBO (Sydney Olympic Broadcasting Organisation) by Australian director Peter Faiman. In Sydney in 2000, there were over 16,000 broadcasters and journalists, and an estimated 3.8 billion viewers watched the games on television.

The games were covered by the following broadcasters:

- Australia: Seven Network
- Ireland: RTÉ
- United Kingdom: BBC
- United States: NBC
- Spain: RTVE
- Portugal: RTP
- Sweden: SVT
- Canada: CBC and TSN
- Japan: NHK
- South Korea: KBS
- Germany: ARD and ZDF
- France: France Télévisions (France 2 and France 3) and Canal +
- Philippines: PTV
- Mexico: Televisa and TV Azteca
- New Zealand: TVNZ
- Brazil: Rede Globo, Rede Bandeirantes, ESPN Brasil and SporTV
- Italy: RAI
- Ukraine: NTU
- Indonesia: TVRI and RCTI
- Vietnam: VTV
- Colombia: Señal Colombia (from 19 September, local time, until their conclusion, after Caracol TV and RCN TV declined to broadcast the games)

Running up to the games an Australian comedy satire, The Games, was broadcast in Australia (it was also broadcast, at a later date, in New Zealand). It featured a spoof of the issues and events that the top-level organisers and bureaucrats suffered in the lead up to the games.

A poignant part of the media coverage happened in the Canadian broadcast. On 28 September, the CBC was airing the Olympics, when the network's chief correspondent, Peter Mansbridge, broke in to report the death of former prime minister Pierre Elliott Trudeau.

NBC presented over 400+ hours on their main and sister stations, CNBC and MSNBC. The downside of the American coverage was that it was presented on tape delay rather than live due to the 15-hour time difference. The lone exception was the gold medal game in Men's Basketball, which featured the U.S. defeating France 85–75. The game was televised live in primetime on Saturday, 30 September (EDT), which was the afternoon of Sunday, 1 October in Australia.

=== 2002 Winter Games ===
An estimated 2.1 billion viewers from 160 countries watched over 13 billion viewing hours during the 2002 Winter Olympics. The average worldwide viewer watched 6 hr 15 min of coverage, while the viewers in the game's host county of the United States watched an average of 29 hours each. The Salt Lake Organizing Committee (SLOC) used the organization International Sports Broadcasting (ISB), who had over 400 cameras, to provide a live video feed of competitions and ceremonies. The various official broadcasting companies in the 160 different countries could then tap into the feed and air the programs live or on a taped delay in their respective markets.

Territory	Rights holder
United States	National Broadcasting Company, Inc. (NBC)
Canada	Canadian Broadcasting Corporation (CBC)
Hispanic America	Organización de la Television Ibero-Americana (OTI)
Europe	European Broadcasting Union (EBU)
Australia	Seven Network Limited
New Zealand	TV New Zealand (TVNZ)
Asia	Asia-Pacific Broadcasting Union (ABU)
Japan	Japan Olympic Pool
South Korea	Korean Olympic Pool
South Africa	Supersport International

=== 2004 Summer Olympics ===
NBC Universal paid the IOC $793 million for U.S. broadcast rights, the most paid by any country. NBC made it possible for the network to broadcast over 1200 hours of coverage during the 2004 Summer Olympics, triple what was broadcast in the U.S. four years earlier. Between all the NBC Universal networks (NBC, CNBC, MSNBC, Bravo, USA Network and Telemundo) the games were on television 24 hours a day, seven days a week.

In their 2004 coverage, NBC and its sister networks presented live coverage throughout the morning and afternoon, while showing marquee events pre-taped in prime time.

For the first time, major broadcasters were allowed to serve video coverage of the Olympics over the Internet, provided that they restricted this service geographically, to protect broadcasting contracts in other areas. For instance, the BBC made their complete live coverage available to UK high-speed Internet customers for free.

NBC launched its own Olympic website, NBCOlympics.com. Focusing on the television coverage of the games, it did provide video clips, medal standings, live results. Its main purpose, however, was to provide a schedule of what sports were on the many stations of NBC Universal. The games were on TV 24 hours a day on one network or another.

=== 2006 Winter Olympics ===
The 2006 Olympic Winter Games were broadcast worldwide by a number of television broadcasters:

- The BBC provided television and radio coverage of the winter Olympics in the UK - the TV coverage was presented mainly by Grandstand regulars such as Hazel Irvine and Clare Balding. Most of the coverage was shown on BBC Two, with some on BBC One, and there was also BBC Red Button for Freeview, Satellite and Cable (digital TV) viewers. BBC also broadcast many events live on the webcast Freeview provides an extra two screens whereas all three interactive streams were available to UK users only on BBC and Digital Satellite and Cable such as Sky Digital.
- Eurosport also provided live coverage of events to viewers across the EU and Europe.
- American Forces Network rebroadcast some of this coverage for military personnel serving outside the United States.
- SportTV2 broadcast for the first time all days and all events in Brazil.
- ČT4 Sport was introduced on the occasion of the Olympic Games in the Czech Republic.

Territory	Rights holder
Australia	Seven Network
Austria	ORF
Belgium	VRT
Belgium	RTBF
Brazil	SportTV2
Canada	CBC
Canada	TSN
Canada	RDS
Canada	Radio-Canada
Canada	CBC Country Canada
China	CCTV-5
Croatia	HRT
Czech Republic	ČT
Czech Republic	ČT4 Sport
Denmark	TV2
Estonia	ETV
Finland	YLE
France	France 2
France	France 3
Germany	ARD
Germany	ZDF
Greece	ERT
Iceland	RÚV
Ireland	RTÉ
Israel	Channel 2
Italy	RAI
Latvia	LTV7
Luxembourg	RTL
Japan	NHK
Malaysia	Astro
Mexico	Televisa
Mexico	TV Azteca
Montenegro	RTCG 1
Netherlands	NOS
Netherlands	Nederland 2
New Zealand	TVNZ
Norway	NRK
Norway	SportN
Poland	TVP
Romania	TVR
Russia	C1R
Russia	RTR
Serbia	RTS
Singapore	MediaCorp 5
South Korea	KBS
South Korea	MBC
South Korea	SBS
Spain	TVE
Sweden	SVT
Switzerland	SSR
Switzerland	TSR
Turkey	TRT
Ukraine	NTU
United Kingdom	BBC
United States	NBC
United States	CNBC
United States	MSNBC
United States	USA Network
United States	Telemundo
United States	Universal HD

About 40% of the television coverage of the 2002 Winter Olympics was in high definition.

==== Ratings and attendance ====
Numerous events reported low spectator attendance despite having acceptable ticket sales. Preliminary competition and locally less popular sports failed to attract capacity crowd as expected. Organizers explained this was because blocks of seats were reserved or purchased by sponsors and partners who later did not show up at the events.

Several news organizations reported that many Americans were not interested in the Olympics as in years past. It has been suggested that reasons for this disinterest include the tape delayed coverage, which showed events in prime-time as much as 18 hours later in the West.

In Canada, CBC's coverage has also posted disappointing numbers, which were reduced as the Canadian men's hockey team was eliminated early in the competition. Primetime ratings reached only as high as #7 in the weekly ratings. However, ratings for live, afternoon coverage have attracted 300,000 more viewers than the taped, primetime coverage. Overall, only primetime coverage has suffered, dropping 45% from the 2002 Games, with the entire coverage being 52% ahead from 2002. Meanwhile, on TSN, the numbers for its live curling coverage (which aired as early as 3:00am EST) were between 300,000 and 500,000 viewers.

The Olympics' main threat in the USA was the 2006 season of American Idol. One night of interest was 23 February in which the first results show of the season went head to head with that night's coverage which included the Women's Free Skate in Figure Skating.

=== 2008 Summer Olympics ===
These games were the first to be produced and broadcast entirely in high-definition television. In their bid for the Olympic games in 2001, Beijing confirmed to the Olympic evaluation commission "that there would be no restrictions on media reporting and movement of journalists up to and including the Olympic Games." The host broadcaster was Beijing Olympic Broadcasting, a joint venture between Olympic Broadcasting Services (OBS) and the Beijing Organizing Committee for the Olympic Games.

In Canada, the public network CBC/Radio-Canada and cable networks TSN and RDS broadcast its final games before a private consortium involving CTV/Rogers/TQS takes over for the 2010 Winter Olympics, which happened within Canadian borders, in Vancouver. In Australia, the Seven Network broadcast its final games before the Nine Network and Pay-TV operator Foxtel took over from the 2010 Winter Olympics and beyond.

== 2010s ==
=== 2010 Winter Games ===
The IOC sold the rights for both the 2010 Winter and the 2012 Summer Games as a package deal to a number of television broadcasters. The host television broadcast was solely produced by OBS for the first time. Previously, a host broadcaster set up by the organising committee of the Games produced the broadcast.

Broadcasters included:

- Australia: Nine Network and Foxtel
- Brazil: Central Record de Comunicação had been awarded the broadcasting for only free to air television on Rede Record.
- Canada: Canada's Olympic Broadcast Media Consortium consists of CTV, V, TSN, RDS, RIS, Rogers Sportsnet, Omni Television, OLN, Rogers radio stations, as well as third-party broadcasters APTN and ATN, MuchMusic
- United Kingdom: BBC
- Hong Kong: Cable TV
- Japan: Japan Consortium
- Mexico: Canal 22
- New Zealand: SKY TV and Prime
- Philippines: Solar Sports
- South Korea: SBS
- Spain: RTVE
- United States: NBC Universal

=== 2012 Summer Olympics ===
For a number of broadcasters, this was the second Games of a packaged rights deal that included both the 2010 Winter and the 2012 Summer Games. Many of the television broadcasters granted rights to the games had bureaux and studios in London, but since at least the 1996 Olympics in Atlanta, rights-holder operations were hosted in the dedicated International Broadcast Centre (IBC). London's IBC was planned to be within the London Olympics Media Centre inside the security cordon of the Olympic Park.

Continuing the IOC's commitment to providing over-the-air television coverage to as broad a worldwide audience as possible, the 2012 Summer Olympics were scheduled to be broadcast by a number of regional broadcasters. The United States television rights were owned by NBC.

Confirmed broadcasters included:

- In the United Kingdom, the BBC was the sole broadcaster of the games.
- In Europe, members of the European Broadcasting Union (excluding RAI in Italy). In Italy, SKY has achieved rights, but was forced to sell 200 hours of the event to RAI due to compulsory free broadcast of the event.
- In the United States, NBC. Though reduced dramatically since 1980, NBC's payments for rights still accounted for over half the rights revenue for the IOC. Some online webcasts of live events were available.
- In Canada, a consortium of Bell Media and Rogers Media properties.
- In South Korea, SBS has the rights to broadcast the games.
- In Brazil, Central Record de Comunicação had been awarded the broadcasting for only free to air television rights on Record and Record News.
- In Mexico, the two major national networks Televisa and TV Azteca broadcast the games.
- In Australia, the Nine Network in joint partnership with subscription television partner Foxtel broadcast the games.

=== 2014 Winter Olympics ===
On August 19, 2008, it was reported that American broadcasters ESPN and ABC, both owned by The Walt Disney Company, were interested in airing both the 2014 Winter Olympics and the 2016 Summer Olympics. ESPN and ABC planned to carry more Olympic events live as opposed to the tape-delay format used by current rights-holder NBC. NBC, FOX and a partnership between CBS and Turner Sports also participated in the bidding process for televising the Games in the United States. In 2011, NBC agreed to a $4.38 billion contract extension with the IOC to broadcast the 2014, 2016, 2018, and 2020 Olympics, the most expensive television rights deal in Olympic history.

In Europe, for the first time, the IOC rejected the offer from EBU to broadcast the 2014 and 2016 Olympics, so individual networks in Europe had to contract for television rights.

Sky Italia in 2008 had reached an agreement to broadcast 2014 and 2016 Olympics.

In Canada, the Canadian Broadcasting Corporation were granted rights to the 2014 and 2016 games in July 2012 for an undisclosed sum.

In Australia, Network Ten spent $20 million for the 2014 Winter Games.

=== 2016 Summer Olympics ===
This was the second Games of NBC's deal to broadcast the 2014, 2016, 2018, and 2020 Olympics.

This was also the second Games of the Canadian Broadcasting Corporation deal for both 2014 and 2016.

In Brazil, Rede Globo and Band won the rights to broadcast the games, but they allowed the IOC to negotiate with others broadcasters about the free-to-air transmission. Rede Record purchased the rights for the free-to-air broadcasts. But, they have the exclusive rights for cable TV and internet.

While Sky Italia initially reached a packaged agreement to broadcast both the 2014 and 2016 Olympics, it later sold the 2016 rights to RAI, holding only the first one. The Italian public service provided over 1000 hours on television over three HD channels avalilable on DTT and satellite, and provided an Internet site and an app which offered every single feed of every sport produced by OBS.

In Australia, Seven Network agreed to a $150 million bundle for 2016, 2018, and 2020.

=== 2018 Winter Olympics ===
Discovery Communications were granted the rights to 2018 and 2020 (except France and United Kingdom), 2022 and 2024 Olympics in Europe, except Russia.

The 2018 Games were broadcast in ultra-high resolution and high dynamic range in select markets. OBS and Japan's NHK produced the world feed that including about 90 hours of content captured in 8K UHD. In South Korea, terrestrial UHD broadcasts employed ATSC 3.0 standard, launched on May 31, 2017, by SBS, MBC, and KBS in major South Korean markets such as Seoul and Incheon. In the United States, UHD broadcasts were available to subscribers of NBC's cable networks, and to subscribers of satellite TV providers DirecTV and Dish Network.

== 2020s ==
=== 2020 Summer Olympics ===
This was the second Games of Discovery Communications' rights agreement for 2018 and 2020 (except France and United Kingdom), 2022 and 2024 Olympics in Europe, except Russia.

The COVID-19 pandemic resulted in the 2020 Games being postponed to 2021. The United States Olympic & Paralympic Committee asserted that a "right of abatement" clause in NBC's contract was triggered by the delay of the Games to 2021, requiring the IOC to "negotiate in good faith an equitable reduction in the applicable broadcast rights payments" by NBC, with the American broadcaster being one of the IOC's biggest revenue streams.

=== 2022 Winter Olympics ===
In China, domestic rights to these Games were owned by China Media Group (CMG), with rights being sublicensed by China Mobile's Migu streaming service.

On May 7, 2014, the IOC granted NBC rights to all Olympic Games from the 2022 Winter to the 2032 Summer Olympics. The agreement was valued at US$7.65 billion, becoming the most expensive deal in the history of the Olympics.

These Games confirmed an ongoing trend in U.S. viewership of the Olympics; while television viewership on NBC's networks had seen a further decline, they were offset by increases in social media engagement and viewership on NBC's streaming platforms. Similar trends were seen in Europe, where amidst falling TV ratings Discovery's Eurosport reported an eight-fold increase in streaming viewership on its platforms and Discovery+ over the 2018 Winter Games.

=== 2024 Summer Olympics ===
As a result of Discovery's merger with WarnerMedia in April 2022, Warner Bros. Discovery (WBD) inherited the rights to the 2024 Olympics in Europe, except Russia. In France, domestic rights were owned by Discovery's Eurosport, with free-to-air coverage sub-licensed to the country's public broadcaster France Télévisions.

Although the IOC listed Telesport Russia as the nominal rights holder for Russia, the main Russian and Belarusian broadcasters were not officially showing the Games in protest of the IOC's sanctions imposed on the two countries following the Russian invasion of Ukraine, which led to a reduced quota of athletes that were listed as "Individual Neutral Athletes"; Belarus and Russia last refused to purchase the broadcasting rights in 1984. The Associated Press noted on 27 July 2024 that Belarusian and Russian viewers were depending on satellite channels and streaming services of neighbouring countries (such as Kazakhstan) to get reasonable coverage of the Games.

=== 2026 Winter Olympics ===
In January 2023, the IOC announced that a joint bid from the European Broadcasting Union (EBU) and Warner Bros. Discovery (WBD) had been awarded rights for all Olympic Games from the 2026 Winter Olympics to the 2032 Summer Olympics. The joint bid between European free to air broadcasters and Warner Bros Discovery follows criticism of the 2015 deal to award European television rights to Discovery. Each EBU member will broadcast at least 200 hours of coverage of the Summer Olympics and at least 100 hours of the Winter Olympics, whereas Warner Bros. Discovery will have unlimited rights.

In Italy, EBU member RAI held the domestic free-to-air TV and digital rights.

=== 2028 Summer Olympics ===
NBC holds the domestic rights to the 2026 Summer Olympics as part of its agreement to broadcast all Olympics from the 2022 Winter to the 2032 Summer Games. Hollywood Park Studios at SoFi Stadium is the planned site of the International Broadcast Centre for the Games along with the NBC/Universal Studios Lot.

=== Future Olympics Games ===
EBU-WBD's joint European rights agreement extends to the 2032 Summer Olympics, which would be affected by the proposed acquisition of Warner Bros. Discovery and whether the company would be split into two units.

In 2024, the IOC announced that NBC's U.S. agreement had been extended to the 2036 Summer Games at a cost of US$3 billion, with Comcast (the owner of NBC) becoming a "strategic partner" of the IOC.

== See also ==
- Olympics on United States television
  - ABC Olympic broadcasts
  - CBS Olympic broadcasts
  - NBC Olympic broadcasts
  - TNT Olympic broadcasts
- Olympics on Australian television
  - Nine Network Olympic broadcasts
  - Seven Network Olympic broadcasts
  - Network Ten Olympic broadcasts
- Olympics on British television
- Olympics on Canadian television
  - Olympics on CTV
  - Olympics on CBC
- Olympics on Chilean television
  - TVN
  - El 13
- Olympics on Chinese television
  - CCTV-16
- Olympics on German television
  - ARD
  - ZDF
- Olympics on Japanese television
  - Japan Consortium
- Olimpics on Mexican television
  - Televisa
  - TV Azteca
- Olympics on Philippine television
  - People's Television Network
- List of Winter Olympic documentary films
- List of Summer Olympic documentary films
