= List of Winter Olympic documentary films =

List of documentary films for individual Winter Olympic Games

The Winter Olympic Games have been filmed and competition highlights released since 1924. An Olympic Film Collection of the International Olympic Committee (IOC) Olympic Foundation for Culture and Heritage (OFCH) includes fifty feature-length films providing a chronicle of the modern Olympic Games. A collection of many Official films was restored, and released as a 2017 home video box set under the title 100 Years of Olympic Films: 1912–2012. “Official” films are those which have been arranged by the host city organizing committee and produced in compliance with the IOC charter. Documentary films for individual Winter Olympic Games which feature actual competition footage are listed below.

== Winter Olympic documentary films ==
#	Games	Film title	Released	Director	Notes
1	Chamonix 1924	Olympic Games held at Chamonix in 1924	1924	Jean de Rovéra	Official
1	Chamonix 1924	Pathé News No 10, 12, 13	1924	Pathé News	
1	Chamonix 1924	Fox News Vol 5 No 31, 40	1924	Fox News	
1	Chamonix 1924	Universal International News No 15	1924	Universal Newsreel	
2	St. Moritz 1928	The White Stadium	1928	Arnold Fanck, Othmar Gurtner	Official
3	Lake Placid 1932	The III Winter Olympics	1932		OCLC 27250287
3	Lake Placid 1932	Olympics, 1932	1933	Victor Coty	
3	Lake Placid 1932	Bill Cunningham's Sports Review: Slides and Glides	1932	Howard C. Brown	
3	Lake Placid 1932	Hearst Metrotone News Vol 3, No 238–241	1932	Hearst Metrotone News	OCLC 423395789
3	Lake Placid 1932	Fox Movietone News No 40–43	1932	Fox Movietone News	
3	Lake Placid 1932	Paramount Sound News No 55, 56, 58	1932	Paramount News	
3	Lake Placid 1932	Universal News No 11–15	1932	Universal Newsreel	
4	Garmisch-Partenkirchen 1936	Jugend der Welt	1936	Carl Junghans	Official
4	Garmisch-Partenkirchen 1936	Olympic Ski Champions	1936	Tobis Film	
4	Garmisch-Partenkirchen 1936	Sports on Ice	1936	Tobis Film	
5	St. Moritz 1948	Fight Without Hate	1948	André Michel	Official
5	St. Moritz 1948	XIVth Olympiad: The Glory of Sport	1948	Castleton Knight	Official
5	St. Moritz 1948	Olympiad i vitt	1948	Torgny Wickman, Georges Alexath, René Boeniger	
5	St. Moritz 1948	1948 Winter Olympics	1948	Hans Thorner	OCLC 49049038
5	St. Moritz 1948	Skis over Europe	1949	John Jay	
6	Oslo 1952	De VI Olympiske vinterleker Oslo 1952	1952	Tancred Ibsen	Official
6	Oslo 1952	Olympic Victory	1952	John Jay	OCLC 36560155
7	Cortina d'Ampezzo 1956	White Vertigo	1956	Giorgio Ferroni	Official
7	Cortina d'Ampezzo 1956	Westward the Flame	1959		1960 teaser
8	Squaw Valley 1960	People, Hopes, Medals	1960	Heribert Meisel	OCLC 1048325668
8	Squaw Valley 1960	Flame in the Snow	1960	Frank Howard	Official
8	Squaw Valley 1960	Olympic Holiday	1960	John Jay	OCLC 68967182
8	Squaw Valley 1960	Winter Olympics on the Tahoe National Forest	1961	USFS	OCLC 42485829
8	Squaw Valley 1960	Magic in the Mountains	2021	Cody Stokes	OCLC 1452710921 retrospective
9	Innsbruck 1964	IX Olympische Winterspiele Innsbruck 1964	1964	Theo Hörmann	Official OCLC 1076256515
9	Innsbruck 1964	Victoires olympiques	1964	Jack Lesage	
10	Grenoble 1968	Snows of Grenoble	1968	Jacques Ertaud, Jean-Jacques Languepin	Official OCLC 104831091
10	Grenoble 1968	13 jours en France	1968	Claude Lelouch, François Reichenbach	Official OCLC 1022996323
10	Grenoble 1968	The Tenth Winter	1968	Dick Barrymore	
11	Sapporo 1972	Sapporo Orinpikku	1972	Masahiro Shinoda	Official
12	Innsbruck 1976	White Rock	1977	Tony Maylam	Official
12	Innsbruck 1976	Ski, un jeu Olympique	1976	Jack Lesage	
12	Innsbruck 1976	Olympic Harmony	1977	Tony Maylam, Tom Clegg	OCLC 19349523
13	Lake Placid 1980	Olympic Spirit	1980	Drummond Challis, Tony Maylam	OCLC 19349393
13	Lake Placid 1980	Do You Believe in Miracles?	1997	Bernard Goldberg	OCLC 981582850 retrospective
13	Lake Placid 1980	Of Miracles and Men	2015	Jonathan Hock	OCLC 1141431955 retrospective
14	Sarajevo 1984	A Turning Point	1984	Kim Takal	Official OCLC 1048310972
15	Calgary 1988	Calgary '88: 16 Days of Glory	1989	Bud Greenspan	Official
16	Albertville 1992	One Light, One World	1992	Joe Jay Jalbert, R. Douglas Copsey	Official OCLC 1048303399
16	Albertville 1992	1992 Winter Olympics highlights	1992	CBS Sports	OCLC 25618422
17	Lillehammer 1994	Lillehammer '94: 16 Days of Glory	1994	Bud Greenspan	Official
18	Nagano 1998	Nagano '98 Olympics: stories of honor and glory	1998	Bud Greenspan	Official
18	Nagano 1998	Olympic Glory	1999	Kieth Merrill	IMAX
19	Salt Lake City 2002	Salt Lake City 2002: Bud Greenspan's stories of Olympic glory	2003	Bud Greenspan	Official
20	Torino 2006	Bud Greenspan's Torino 2006: stories of Olympic glory	2007	Bud Greenspan	Official OCLC 1048320883
21	Vancouver 2010	Bud Greenspan presents Vancouver 2010: stories of Olympic glory	2010	Bud Greenspan, Nancy Beffa	Official OCLC 1048299719
21	Vancouver 2010	XXI Olympic Winter Games	2010	CTV Sports	OCLC 649716546 broadcast recording
22	Sochi 2014	Rings of the World	2014	Sergei Miroshnichenko	Official
23	PyeongChang 2018	Crossing Beyond	2018	Yi Seung-Jun	Official
23	PyeongChang 2018	Every Rise, Every Fall, Every Victory — We're In It Together	2022	Salomon Ligthelm	2022 teaser
24	Beijing 2022	Powered by Belief	2022		closing ceremony short
24	Beijing 2022	Beijing 2022	2023	Lu Chuan	Official
25	Milano Cortina 2026	Behind the Screen: Milano Cortina 2026	2026	Olympic Broadcasting Services	Official featurette
25	Milano Cortina 2026	Milano Cortina 2026: XXV Olympic Winter Games	2026	NBC	broadcast recording
25	Milano Cortina 2026	Dancing For Gold	2026		

== See also ==
- List of Summer Olympic documentary films
- Olympics on television
- FIFA World Cup official films
