= Tokyo Olympiad =

- Directed by: Kon Ichikawa
- Screenplay by: Natto Wada; Yoshio Shirasaka; Shuntarō Tanikawa; Kon Ichikawa
- Produced by: Suketaro Taguchi
- Narrated by: Ichiro Mikuni
- Cinematography: Shigeo Hayashida; Kazuo Miyagawa
- Edited by: Yoshio Ebara
- Music by: Toshiro Mayuzumi
- Production company: Organizing Committee for the Games of the XVIII Olympiad
- Distributed by: Toho
- Release date: 20 March 1965 (Japan)
- Running time: 169 minutes
- Country: Japan
- Language: Japanese
- Box office: ¥2.4 billion (Japan); 24.5 million tickets (Japan/France)

Tokyo Olympiad (東京オリンピック, Tōkyō Orinpikku; lit. 'Tokyo Olympics') is a 1965 Japanese documentary film directed by Kon Ichikawa about the 1964 Summer Olympics in Tokyo. Like Leni Riefenstahl's Olympia, which documented the 1936 Summer Olympics in Berlin, Ichikawa's film was considered a cinematographic milestone in documentary filmmaking. However, Tokyo Olympiad keeps its focus far more on the atmosphere of the games and the human side of the athletes rather than concentrating on winning and the results. It is one of the few sports documentaries included in the book 1001 Movies You Must See Before You Die.

== Production history ==
The 1964 Summer Olympics were seen as vitally important to the Japanese government. Much of Japan's infrastructure had been destroyed during World War II and the Olympics were seen as a chance to re-introduce Japan to the world and show off its new modernised roads and industry as well as its burgeoning economy. Every Olympics since the first modern games in 1896 Summer Olympics had been committed to film to some extent or another, usually financed by the International Olympic Committee (IOC) for reasons of posterity. For the 1964 Olympics the Japanese government decided to finance their own film and initially hired Akira Kurosawa who, at the time, was the most famous Japanese director worldwide thanks to films such as Ikiru and Seven Samurai. However, Kurosawa's famous tendency for complete control - he demanded to not only direct the film but the opening and closing ceremonies as well - led to his dismissal. This led to the bringing in of Ichikawa, who had a reputation of coming into productions where events had not followed the initial plans.

== Controversy ==
Ichikawa's vision of the Tokyo Olympics was controversial at the time as it was the opposite of what the Japanese government wanted and expected of the film. Ichikawa presented a film which was very much a cinematic and artistic recording of the events, more concerned with the athletes and spectators, than the straightforward journalistic, historical recording that was expected by its financiers. As a result, the Japanese Olympic Committee forced Ichikawa to re-edit the picture to better suit their requirements, with the final, re-edited, version clocking in at 93 minutes rather than the original's 165 minutes.

== Release ==
Tokyo Olympiad was released theatrically in Japan on 20 March 1965 where it was distributed by Toho. It had its original 165-minute runtime and included an intermission.

The film was released in the United States on 20 October 1965, in its edited format with a 93-minute runtime, by Pan-World Film Exchange and Jack Douglas Enterprises, and with an added English language narration. The film was later reissued in 1984 by Janus Films and Night Kitchen, Inc. with English subtitles at the original 165-minute runtime.

A 125-minute cut of the film with English narration is available to view on YouTube via the official Olympics channel. It is titled The Complete Tokyo 1964 Olympics Film although this version is nearly 45 minutes shorter than the original release.

As of 2020, a restored, full and unedited version of the original Japanese release is available to view on the Olympic Channel's own website.

== Box office ==
The film initially had a distributor rental income of ¥1,223,210,000 in Japanese theaters, where it drew 7.5 million admissions. It was later screened in schools and public halls, drawing a further 16 million admissions. This brought its total box office to 23.5 million admissions, setting the record for the highest-grossing film in Japan in terms of box office admissions. Its record was later matched by Hayao Miyazaki's anime film Spirited Away (2001).

In France, the film sold 993,555 tickets at the box office, bringing its total box office admissions to 24,493,555 tickets sold in Japan and France.

== Reception ==
The film is held in very high critical regard and is seen, alongside Leni Riefenstahl's Olympia, as one of the best films about the Olympics and, indeed, as one of the best sports documentaries of all time. Its focus on the humanity of athletes and spectators, showing the physical effort, excitement, joy of victory and disappointment of defeat, rather than simply the recording of results, was seen as highly original, and the use of zoom lenses and close-ups set a new standard for the filming of sports. Based on 11 reviews collected by the film review aggregator Rotten Tomatoes, 100% of critics gave the film a positive review. Ichikawa was recognised by the IOC with the award of the Olympic Diploma of Merit.

== Commercial availability ==
It was released in North America on DVD through The Criterion Collection in 2002 but was made out of print in 2007. It would appear on eBay regularly but often at prices around $70. In the UK, it was released through Tartan Video but was also taken out of print.

In 2004, it was released on DVD in Japan through Toho. In addition to the 170-minute theatrical version, there was a 148-minute "40th Anniversary Edition", which was also considered a director's cut. This has not been made available outside of Japan.

In 2013, the official Olympic YouTube channel made a 125-minute edited version with the English narration available on the internet.

In December 2017, The Criterion Collection issued on Blu-ray and DVD, under exclusive license from the IOC, 100 Years of Olympic Films: 1912-2012, which includes Tokyo Olympiad. Ichikawa's documentary subsequently received a new standalone release.

In 2019, the official Olympic Channel's own website made a digitally restored and unedited copy of the full original release available on the internet.

== Other official films of the Olympic Games ==
- Olympia (1938), directed by Leni Riefenstahl about Berlin 1936
- La grande olimpiade (1961), directed by Romolo Marcellini about Rome 1960
- Visions of Eight (1973), an anthology film about Munich 1972
- 16 Days of Glory (1986), directed by Bud Greenspan about Los Angeles 1984

== See also ==
- 1964 Summer Paralympics
- 1964 Winter Olympics
- Olympic Games held in Japan
  - 1964 Summer Olympics – Tokyo
  - 1972 Winter Olympics – Sapporo
  - 1998 Winter Olympics – Nagano
  - 2020 Summer Olympics – Tokyo
- List of IOC country codes
