= Real Skifi =

Finnish film production company

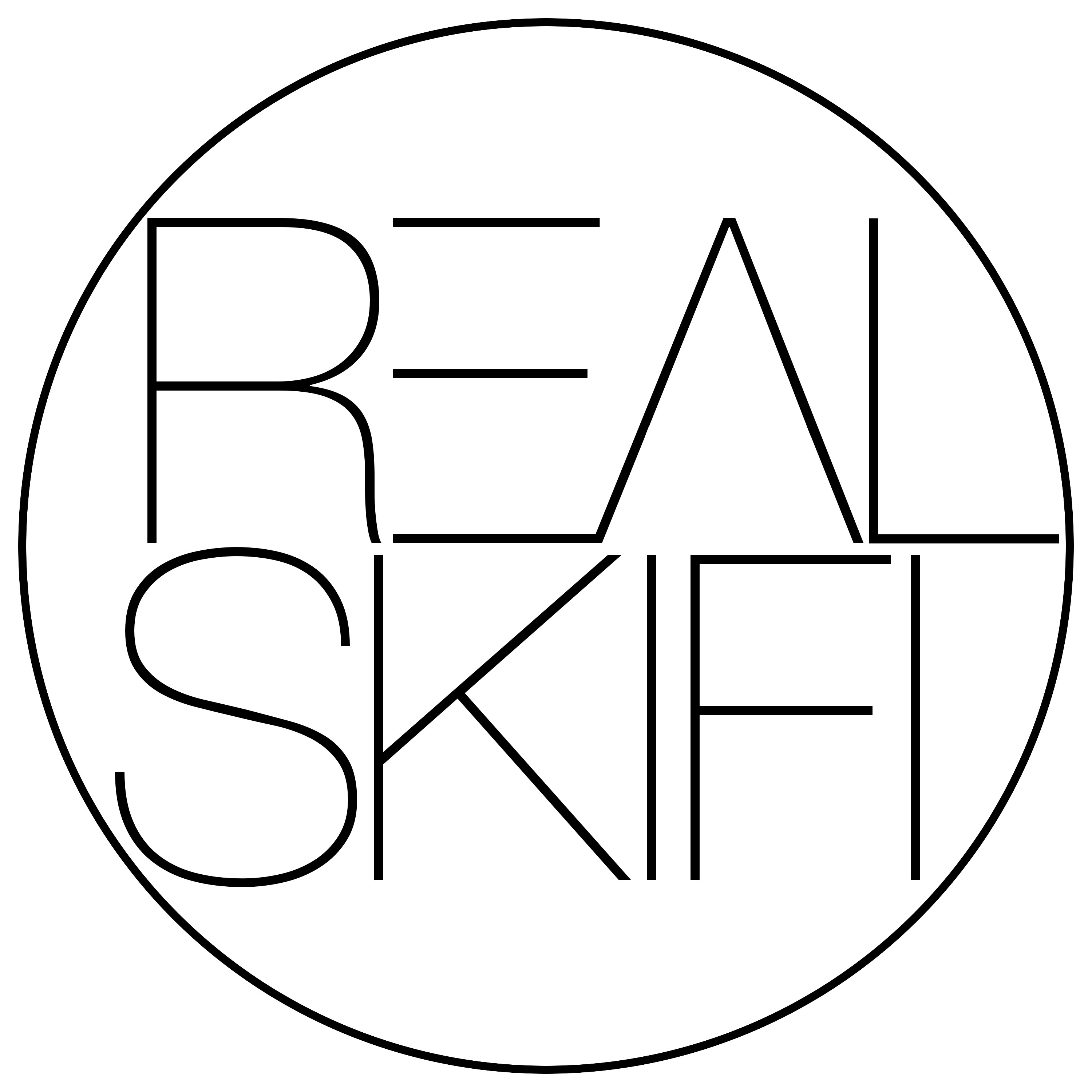
Real Skifi logo

Real Skifi is a Finnish ski film production company known for their creative films. Real Skifi was founded in November 2010 and they published their first film in February 2011. Real Skifi's videos have been viewed over 4 million times on YouTube. The tricks are performed by skiers Juho Kilkki, Ilkka Hannula and Verneri Hannula. Directing, filming and editing is done by Janne Korpela and Anton Geier is also a filmer. In addition to their own videos Real Skifi has produced a segment to Level 1 Partly Cloudy ski film.

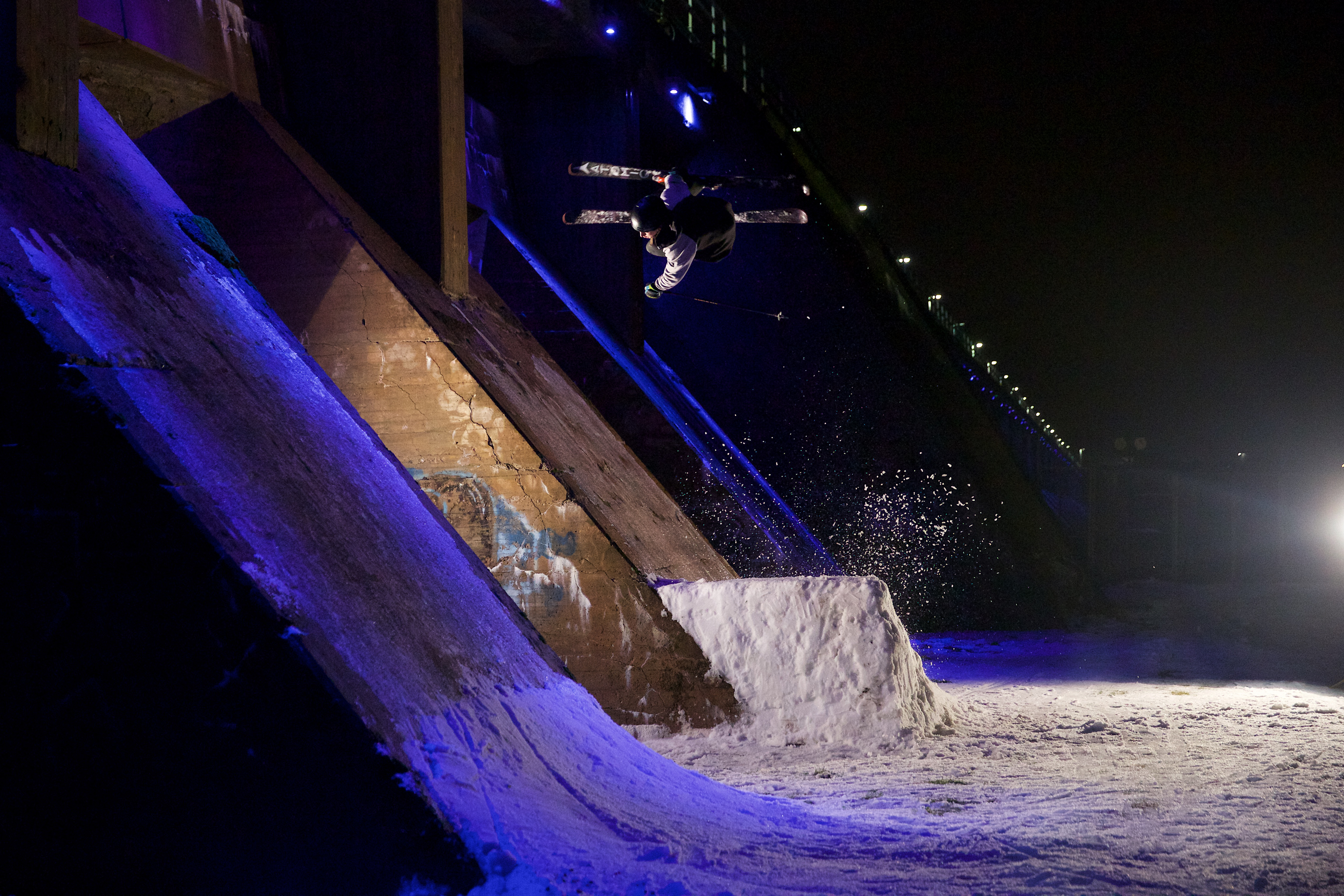
Juho Kilkki Flatspin from Real Skifi Episode 14. Photo Janne Korpela
