= The Grand Olympics =

- Directed by: Romolo Marcellini
- Written by: Nicolò Ferrari; Daniele G. Luisi; Romolo Marcellini
- Produced by: Franco Galliano
- Music by: Angelo Francesco Lavagnino
- Release date: May 26, 1961
- Running time: 142 minutes
- Country: Italy
- Language: Italian

The Grand Olympics (Italian: La grande olimpiade) is a 1961 Italian documentary film, directed by Romolo Marcellini, made in 1961. It was nominated as Best Documentary Feature at 34th Academy Awards in 1961.

== Plot ==
142 minutes of the film speak of events and athletes that have characterized the 1960 Summer Olympics in Rome. From Wilma Rudolph, called the black gazelle, to Livio Berruti, the first Italian to win a gold medal in a sprint race, to the deeds of Ethiopian marathon runner Abebe Bikila, who won the marathon racing barefoot.

== Other Official Films of the Olympic Games ==
- Olympia (1938), directed by Leni Riefenstahl about Berlin 1936
- Tokyo Olympiad (1965), directed by Kon Ichikawa about Tokyo 1964
- 16 Days of Glory (1986), directed by Bud Greenspan about Los Angeles 1984
