= Ski film =

Film with sequences of activity on snow skis

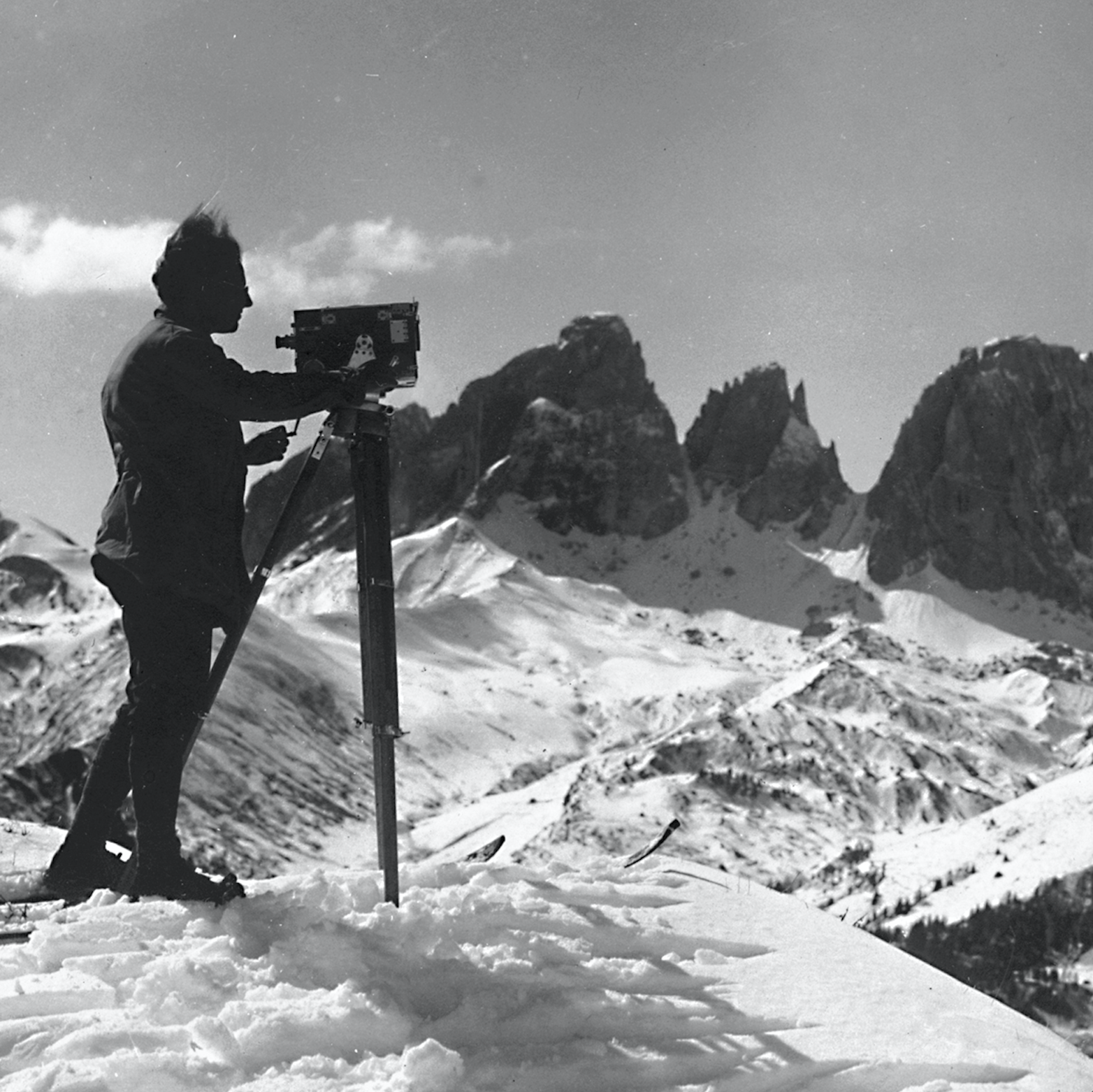
Dr. Fanck filming in the Alps

A ski film is a motion picture with sequences of expedition, recreation, competition, or acrobatic exhibition on snow skis. These non-fiction action sport films capture the experience of an athletic outdoor snow sporting culture. Ski films typically present one or more techniques (ski jumping, cross-country, downhill, freestyle), locations, or skiers (expert, celebrity or novice). Categories include the feature, documentary of competition or other event coverage (such as a snow festival or sportscast), instruction or technique demonstration, retrospective history, travel guide showcasing a region, or a short subject (such as a web series or included in a newsreel). More than 200 such videos debuted in 2006. Notable examples are listed at the Ski and Snowboard Film Institute, or have received awards from the International Ski Film Festival, X-Dance Action Sports Film Festival, IF3 International Freeski Film Festival, Newschoolers magazine, Cold Smoke Winter Film, Powder magazine, or similar.

== Feature film ==
Feature-length entertainment films about skiing, skiers, and the ski lifestyle, shot in actual locations around the world and featuring the best skiers of the day, have been released annually since 1938. Although not distributed through normal film channels, these movies were first exhibited on the resort, club, film festival and ski show circuit and are now available via internet video or home video.

Many features include sequences of other mountain, airborne, water, or speed sports. Slow motion and time-lapse effects and skier point of view shots have been used in ski films since the first features of Dr. Fanck. Many film makers release a film early in the ski season, with content recorded in the past season or two. The following list is a chronology of prolific feature production companies or directors with numerous ski films over the indicated time span.

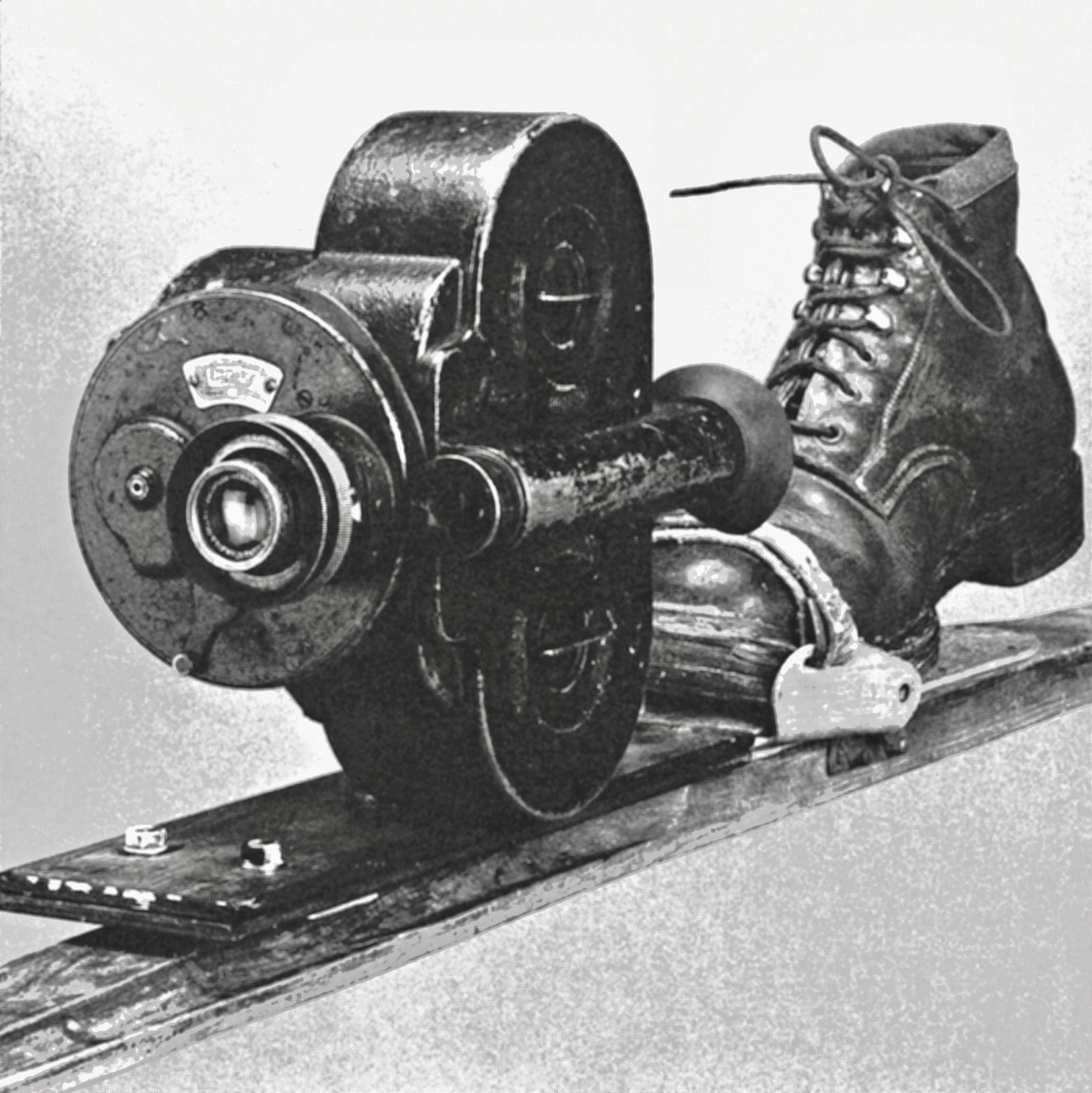
Early camera mounted on ski for point of view shots

=== Feature-length film series ===
- annual Bergfilme of Arnold Fanck, documentary and dramas (1920–1931)
- Victor Coty ski films (1933–1969)
- Frank Howard Films (1935–1960)
- annual Sidney Shurcliff films (1938–1941)
- annual John Jay Films (1940–1970)
- Hans Thorner films (1948–1955)
- annual Warren Miller and successor Warren Miller Entertainment films (1950–present)
- annual Hans Gmoser films (1958–1968)
- annual Dick Barrymore films (1961–1980)
- Willy Bogner, Jr. films (1966–2009)
- annual Greg Stump films (1985–1998, 2012)
- Peter Chrzanowski films (1988–1997)
- annual films by James Angrove and Jon Long of Real Action Pictures (1988–1998)
- Thierry Donard and Nuit de la Glisse films (1989–present)
- Scott Gaffney Productions and Straight Up Films (1993–1999)
- annual films by Teton Gravity Research (1996–present)
- annual films by Steve Winter and Murray Wais of Matchstick Productions (1997–present)
- annual Sky Pinnick and Rage Films (2002–2009)
- annual Howell brothers’ Powderwhore Productions (2005–2015)
- annual films by Johnny Decesare and Poor Boyz Productions (2007–present)
- annual films by Josh Berman's Level 1 Productions (2009–2019)
- recent films by Sherpas Cinema, etc.

== Other films ==
Many ski film makers have initially or predominately released featurettes and short films, in addition to features.

=== Featurette and short film series ===
- Winston Pote winter films (1927–1943)
- annual Marcel Ichac ski films (1934–1950, 1957, 1972)
- Dick Durrance films (1940–1993)
- Sverre Engen films (1944–1962)
- annual Jack Lesage and Cinépress ski films (1959–1984)
- Roger Brown and Barry Corbet freestyle Summit Films (1961–1988, 2012)
- Harvey Edwards Films (1970–1986)
- Joe Jay Jalbert Productions (1970–present)
- Alain Gaimard and Didier Lafond Apocalypse Snow series and other ski films (1981–1986, 2008)
- annual Dominique Perret and Vertical Zoo films (1990–2012)
- annual Poor Boyz Productions (1996–2006)
- annual Free Radicals series films (1996–2011)
- Two Plank Productions (1997–2012)
- Kris Ostness and Wind-Up Films (1999–2008)
- annual Darrell Miller and Storm Show Studios (2000–2020)
- annual Geoff McDonald and Meathead Films (2000–2015)
- annual Level 1 Productions (2000–present)
- annual Josh Murphy and Unparalleled Productions (2000–2004)
- annual Pléhouse Films (2001–2007)
- annual Lionel Géhin and WW Productions (2001–2008)
- annual Martini brothers' Stept Productions (2002–2014)
- annual Falquet brothers' FLK productions (2002–2021)
- annual Heart Films (2006–present)
- AJ Dakoulas and Andrew Napier's 4Bi9 Media (2007–present)
- annual Eric Pollard and Nimbus Independent productions (2007–present)
- annual Mike Douglas and Switchback Entertainment productions (2007–present)
- annual Nicholas Waggoner and Sweetgrass Productions (2008–present)
- annual Legs of Steel releases (2010–present)
- annual Dubsatch Collective releases (2011–present)
- annual releases from The Bunch (2013–present)
- annual Blank Collective releases (2015–present)

Ski film may also refer to a fictional theatrical-release sports film which incorporates a skiing theme, although the on-snow scenes may have been enhanced by the use of stunt doubles for the actors and special effects.

== Film festivals and tours ==
Ski, snow, adventure and mountain film festivals are held in Switzerland (Les Diablerets/FIFAD), Austria (Graz, St. Anton, Vienna Freeride), Germany (Tegernsee), Italy (Cortina, Trento), France (Annecy High Five, Dijon, Val d'Isère, Chamonix), Russia (Moscow), Spain (Torello), Canada (Banff, Montreal, Whistler, Rossland, Fernie, Vancouver), United Kingdom (London FreeSki, Fort William, Kendal), New Zealand (Wānaka) and United States (Ishpeming, Jackson Hole, Steamboat Springs, New York City, Midwest, Crested Butte, Mammoth, Missoula, Lake Tahoe, Stowe, Salt Lake City, North Bend, Boulder, Whitefish, Flagstaff, Williamstown, Mount Snow, Anchorage).

Multi-film road tours which bring a selection of films to scheduled cities have included Banff World Tour, Freeride Film Festival Prime Tour, Vancouver VIMFF World Tour, Salomon Quality Ski Time Film Tour and Level 1 Freeski Film Tour.

== See also ==
- List of Winter Olympic documentary films
- List of sports films#Skiing
- Surf film
- Travel documentary
- Winter sport
