= Mike Douglas (filmmaker) =

Canadian skier and filmmaker

- Born: November 15, 1969 (age 56); Whistler, British Columbia, Canada
- Occupations: Skier; filmmaker

Mike Douglas (born November 15, 1969) is a Canadian skier and filmmaker from Whistler, British Columbia, Canada. He is known as the "Godfather of Freeskiing" due to his involvement in creating the first high-performance twin-tip ski, the Salomon 1080. For his pioneering feats in the sports of freestyle skiing and freeskiing, he is considered to be one of the most influential freeskiers of all time.

Douglas is also a documentary filmmaker. In 2004, he founded Switchback Entertainment, a small production company also based in Whistler, Canada. Switchback Entertainment produces documentary and adventure films, as well as commercials. Douglas and Switchback Entertainment produced the web series Salomon TV between 2007 and 2023.

== Other interests ==
Douglas was a TV commentator for the skiing events at ESPN's X Games from 2001 until 2014.

In 2018, Douglas helped found the Canadian chapter of the environmental non-profit organization Protect Our Winters, and was the chairman of its board until 2023. He is also on the board of the Whistler Blackcomb Foundation, a role he has held since 2013.

Douglas has been voted "Favorite Whistlerite" seven times by the readers of Pique Newsmagazine, a locally-produced weekly newspaper in his hometown of Whistler, British Columbia.

== Awards ==
- The Freedom Chair – 2011 Best Mountain Sports film – Banff Mountain Film Festival, Most Inspiring Story – 5 Point Film Festival
- Tempting Fear – 2012 Best Action Film – Adventure Film Festival, Best Story X-Dance Film Festival
- Snowman – 2014 Best Mountain Culture film – Whistler Film Festival, Best Script – Bilbao Mendi Film Festival
- Whistler Blackcomb: Fifty Years of Going Beyond – Skade Award – International Skiing History Association
- Eclipse – 2016 Best Snow film – Banff Mountain Film Festival, Best Mountain Culture Film – Whistler Film Festival, Best Adventure Film – New York Wild Film Festival
- Live Along the Way – Grand Prize – NZ Mountain Film Festival
- Sam and Me – Best BC Film – BC Environmental Film Festival

== Ski filmography ==
- Smart Mogul Skiing (1994) – Momentum
- Bump2Bump with Jean-Luc Brassard (1995) – C3 Productions
- State of Mind (1997) – Poor Boyz Productions
- Fistful of Moguls (1998) – Greg Stump
- Degenerates (1998) – Poor Boyz Productions
- Skiing's Last Stand – Mike Hilb
- Fifty (1999) – Warren Miller
- Global Storming (1999) – Matchstick Productions
- 13 (1999) – Poor Boyz Productions
- Area 51 (1999) – Teton Gravity Research
- Supershow (1999) – Mike Hilb
- Ski Movie (2000) – Matchstick Productions
- The Game (2000) – Poor Boyz Productions
- Ski Movie 2: High Society (2001) – Matchstick Productions
- Propaganda (2002) – Poor Boyz Productions
- Ski Movie 3: The Front Line (2003) – Matchstick Productions
- Happy Dayz (2003) – Poor Boyz Productions
- Focused (2004) – Matchstick Productions
- Ready, Fire, Aim (2004) – Poor Boyz Productions
- Yearbook (2004) – Matchstick Productions
- X=10 (2005) – Poor Boyz Productions
- The Hit List (2005) – Matchstick Productions
- War (2006) – Poor Boyz Productions
- Focused (2006) – Matchstick Productions
- Seven Sunny Days (2007) – Matchstick Productions
- Reasons (2008) – Poor Boyz Productions
- Wave Skiing in Hawaii (2010) – Salomon Freeski TV
- Glacier Express (2012) – Salomon Freeski TV
- McConkey (2013) – Matchstick Productions
- Snowman (2014) – Switchback Entertainment
- Ruapehu (2015) – Salomon Freeski TV
- The Skier's Haute Route (2016) – Salomon Freeski TV
- 50 Years of Going Beyond (2015) – Switchback Entertainment
- Fountain of Youth (2017) – Switchback Entertainment
- Sam and Me (2022) – Switchback Entertainment
