= Rommel's Treasure =

1955 film

- Directed by: Romolo Marcellini
- Written by: Gino De Santis; Duncan Elliott; Frank Gervasi; Ugo Guerra; Romolo Marcellini
- Produced by: Hans Hass; Luigi Rovere
- Starring: Dawn Addams; Paul Hubschmid; Isa Miranda
- Cinematography: Raimondo Bucher; Renato Del Frate; Angelo Lotti
- Music by: Carlo Rustichelli
- Production companies: Imperial Film; Translux
- Distributed by: Variety Distribution
- Release date: 22 December 1955
- Running time: 85 minutes
- Countries: Italy; United States
- Language: Italian

Rommel's Treasure (Italian: Il tesoro di Rommel) is a 1955 Italian-American drama film directed by Romolo Marcellini and starring Dawn Addams, Paul Hubschmid and Isa Miranda.

== Synopsis ==
In post-war Cairo a variety of different people seek a stash of valuables and secret documents left behind by Erwin Rommel during the North African Campaign.

== Cast ==
- Dawn Addams as Sofia
- Paul Hubschmid as von Brunner
- Isa Miranda as Mrs. Fischer
- Bruce Cabot as Welles
- Andrea Checchi as Krikorian
- Wolfgang Lukschy as Petersen
- Fanfulla as Muezir
- Taheyya Kariokka
- John Stacy
- Vittorio Massimo as Krikorian
- Cristina Pall
- Paolo Caccia Dominioni as himself

== Bibliography ==
- Parish, Robert. Film Actors Guide. Scarecrow Press, 1977.
