= Seven Network Olympic broadcasts =

Series of sports broadcasts in Australia

- Official logo
- Also known as: Official logo of Channel Seven alongside olympic rings
- Genre: Olympics telecasts
- Country of origin: Australia
- Original language: English
- No. of seasons: 9

Production
- Production locations: Various Olympic venues (event telecasts and studio segments)
- Camera setup: Multi-camera
- Running time: Varies

Original release
- Network: Seven Network
- Release: 26 July 1992 – 24 August 2008; 6 August 2016 – 20 February 2022

Related
- Paralympics on Seven

The broadcasts of Summer and Winter Olympic Games produced by Seven Sport are televised on the Seven Network in Australia.

Seven first broadcast the Olympics in 1956, jointly with the Nine Network and the ABC. It has since broadcast Olympic games intermittently, either jointly with other broadcasters or solely.

== History ==
=== Early history ===
The Seven Network was a joint broadcaster for the 1956 Summer Olympics held in Melbourne, which was the first Olympics telecast in Australia, which it shared with the ABC and Nine television stations in Melbourne and Sydney.

The same trio of broadcasters telecast the 1976 Summer Olympics, before Seven gained exclusivity for the 1980 Summer Olympics. It lost the rights for the next two Games before regaining rights from 1992. With rising costs associated with purchasing broadcasting rights, Seven shared the telecast with SBS for the 2004 and 2008 Games.

=== Recent years ===
Seven held Australian free-to-air, pay television, online, and mobile telephony broadcast rights to the 2008 Summer Olympics in Beijing, on-selling some events to SBS. The live telecast of the Games of the XXIX Olympiad was shared by both the Seven Network and SBS Television. Seven broadcast the opening and closing ceremonies and mainstream sports, including swimming, athletics, rowing, cycling, and gymnastics. In contrast, SBS TV provided complementary coverage focused on long-form events such as football, road cycling, volleyball, and table tennis.

Seven lost its Olympics rights for the 2010 Winter Olympics and the 2012 Summer Olympics to a joint bid by the Nine Network and Foxtel. Rights to just the 2014 Winter Olympics were acquired by Network Ten.

On 5 August 2014, it was announced that Seven had acquired rights to the Olympics in Australia across all platforms for an undisclosed amount, in a deal lasting from 2016 through 2020, and also including the 2014 Summer Youth Olympics. IOC president Thomas Bach praised the deal, stating that the Committee "enjoys long term partnerships and this agreement is something of a homecoming between us and Seven." Seven West Media CEO Tim Worner explained that unlike previous stints as rightsholder, it would not necessarily have to sub-license the Games to a secondary broadcaster (as it had historically done with the ABC), stating that "[with] around 150 hours of content on any given day, there will be many more opportunities than ever before". However, Worner did not rule out the possibility of doing so.

For the 2016 Summer Olympics, coverage was offered across Seven, 7Two and 7mate. In order to allow Games to be broadcast in high definition in all capital cities, 7HD was temporarily changed to a simulcast of Seven's primary channel in Sydney, Brisbane and Perth for the duration of the Games. The Games were also streamed through a freemium mobile app; full access to Games content (including coverage of all events on live and on-demand basis) required purchase of a "premium" service costing $19.99. This content was also available free to Telstra mobile subscribers. Free content was limited to 900 hours of live content simulcast from the three Seven Network channels, and 300 hours of live digital-only content. Highlights of events were broadcast in the afternoon, while primetime program In Rio Today broadcast key moments, interviews and background information each night. Regularly scheduled programs Sunrise, Seven News at 6pm and The Chase Australia aired throughout, while other programming were taken off air for the duration of the Games on Seven.

Seven offered 2018 Winter Olympics coverage across Seven, 7Two and 7mate as well as its "OlympicsOn7" app, which similarly to its 2016 Olympics service, offered a mix of free or paid coverage. 245 hours of broadcast Olympic content are expected. Seven will continue broadcasting scheduled programs Sunrise, The Chase Australia, Seven News at 6pm, Home & Away and My Kitchen Rules, with Olympic coverage airing at other times on its main channel. Hamish McLachlan, Edwina Bartholomew, Mel McLaughlin and Jason Richardson will be primary anchors based in PyeongChang. Three Olympic-themed The Front Bar specials will air during coverage.

Seven lost the rights to the 2024 Summer Olympics, the 2026 Winter Olympics, the 2028 Summer Olympics, the 2030 Winter Olympics and the 2032 Summer Olympics to rivals Nine Network.

== Awards and honors ==
During its time as the broadcaster of the Olympic Games, it has won the Olympic Golden Rings for the Best Television coverage for the best television programme during the 2004 Olympic Games in Athens.

During the 2006 Olympics in Turin, Seven and NBC Universal were the major recipients of the Golden Rings; with Seven taking the Golden Rings for the best Olympic Programme, the Silver Rings for the best Olympic feature (NBC Universal received the Golden Rings), and the Bronze Rings for the Best Sports Coverage (behind SRG Switzerland and YLE Finland).

== Criticism ==
Seven's coverage of the 2008 Summer Olympics was widely criticized by many viewers, who were angry at the networks contractual obligation to show AFL football over the Olympics. Viewers also complained that many team sports were delayed, with the absence of Roy and HG further angering viewers.

Seven's use of a paid service for full access to 2016 Summer Olympics content was criticized for contradicting and being a loophole around anti-siphoning laws (which require that specific sporting events, such as the Olympics, must have their rights primarily held by a terrestrial broadcaster), which account for premium television platforms such as Foxtel but not for over-the-top internet services. The arrangement was criticized by Tony Shepherd, chairman of the Australian Subscription Television and Radio Association (ASTRA), for serving as evidence that the existing anti-siphoning rules were outdated. Although considering the model to be "legal and understandable", Shepherd stated that Seven's "paywall" was "precisely the outcome the anti-siphoning scheme is meant to guard against."

== Ratings ==
Due in large part to their coverage of the 2000 Summer Olympics in Sydney, Australia, the Seven Network won the ratings year for the first time in almost 20 years, just missing out on a clean sweep across the country – something that was rectified in 2007. The opening ceremony was one of the highest-ever rating television programmes in the country, with 6.5 million viewers.

== Broadcast rights history ==
Year	Host	Shared telecast	Multichannels used	Cost of rights	Ref
1956 Summer	Melbourne	ABC; Nine	Multichannels not available	—N/a	
1976 Summer	Montreal	ABC; Nine	Multichannels not available	—N/a	
1980 Summer	Moscow	No	Multichannels not available	—N/a	
1992 Summer	Barcelona	No	Multichannels not available	—N/a	
1996 Summer	Atlanta	No	Multichannels not available	—N/a	
2000 Summer	Sydney	No	Multichannels not available	—N/a	
2002 Winter	Salt Lake City	No	Multichannels not available	—N/a	
2004 Summer	Athens	SBS	Multichannels not available	—N/a	
2006 Winter	Turin	No	Multichannels not available	$71 million	
2008 Summer	Beijing	SBS	7HD (simulcast)	—N/a	
2016 Summer	Rio de Janeiro	No	7Two; 7mate	$150-$170 million	
2018 Winter	Pyeongchang	No	7Two; 7mate	$150-$170 million	
2020 Summer	Tokyo	No	7Two; 7mate 7plus (streaming)	$150-$170 million	
2022 Winter	Beijing	No	7two 7mate 7plus (streaming)		

== See also ==
- Olympics on Australian television
- Network Ten Olympic broadcasts
- Nine Network Olympic broadcasts
- Australia at the Olympics
