= Raimondo Bucher =

Italian freediver

Raimondo bucher

Raimondo Bucher (Gödöllő, March 15, 1912 - Rome, September 10, 2008) was an Italian freediver and scuba diver, pioneer of Italian and world diving and underwater photocinematography.

== Biography ==
Raimondo Bucher was born to an Italian father on March 15, 1912 in the Austro-Hungarian Empire. In 1932 he entered the italian Regia Aeronautica by enrolling in the Bergamo air piloting school, where in 1937 he became a flight and aerobatics instructor. During the Second World War he participated in numerous war actions and after 8 September 1943, he joined the Allies in the war of liberation, after which he remained in service in the Air Force with the rank of Captain.

In 1937, his aviation students gave him a diving mask and a spring-loaded speargun and in his dives, he perfected the maneuver of equalization with the noseclip inside the divemask , which immediately allowed him to descend in apnea even at -25 meters. He employed this technique all his life.

In 1949 at Capri he descended in apnea to -29 meters in the presence of a commission and in 1950, accepting the challenge of the "Circolo Subacquei Napoletani" (Neapolitan Underwater Club), in the presence of the federal commissioners he descended to -30 meters: this was the first official freediving world record. In 1952, he set a new world record by free diving down to -39 meters.

In the same year he participates, together with his wife Enza in the "National Underwater Expedition in the Red Sea" from which the feature film "Sesto Continente", the first full-color underwater documentary, was made by Bruno Vailati and Folco Quilici (1954).

In 1962, Raimondo Bucher began to train Luciana Civico (who later became his wife) in scuba diving and in the same year Luciana Civico obtained the compressed air diving record, reaching the depth of -80mt.

== Publications ==
- Raimondo Bucher, "I Segreti del Mare", Firenze, Centro Internazionale del Libro, 1959.
- Raimondo Bucher, "L'immersione subacquea", Milano, Mondadori, 1967.
- Raimondo Bucher, "Una vita in fondo al mare", Nardini, 1984, ISBN 9788840442402.
- Raimondo Bucher, "La mia vita tra terra, cielo e mare", Formello, IRECO, 1999, ISBN 9788886253093.

== Cinematography ==
- actor in the part of himself in "Sesto Continente", 1954
- Underwater shooting "Rommel's Treasure", 1955
