= Olympics on Australian television =

Australian television series

The Olympic Games have been broadcast on Australian television since 1956, coinciding with both the introduction of television in Australia as well as the first year Australia hosted an Olympics. All three commercial networks have broadcast the Summer Olympics or Winter Olympics at least once, as have both public broadcasters and the dominant subscription television platform Foxtel, often sharing broadcasting rights with another network.

The Olympics is on the anti-siphoning list, meaning subscription television providers are banned from bidding for exclusive broadcasting rights, to ensure the sporting event is available on free-to-air television to all viewers.

== History ==
=== 1956 ===
Television in Australia was launched in order to ensure the first Olympics to be held in Australia could be broadcast. The only three television stations in Melbourne and Sydney shared the rights. For technical reasons, Sydney viewers received pictures up to a day later than Melbourne viewers.

=== 2000s ===
Throughout the 2000s, the Seven Network held the broadcast rights to all the Summer and Winter Games, sharing rights with SBS in both 2004 and 2008. SBS primarily broadcast long form events and less popular sports.

Seven's coverage received multiple awards across the decade from the IOC at their media awards known as the Golden Rings. It was awarded 'Best Olympic Programme' in 2004, received three awards in 2006 and took the gold award for 'Best Olympic Programme' for the third year in a row in 2008.

=== 2010s ===
The Nine Network and Foxtel jointly secured a broadcast rights package which included both the 2010 Winter Olympics and 2012 Summer Olympics, reportedly paying up to $120 million. It marked the first time a subscription television provider was an official Olympics broadcast partner in Australia. Foxtel provided 8 dedicated channels and was the first time more than one channel of Olympic coverage was offered, and also the first time Australian viewers could pay to access Olympic content beyond what was available on free to air television.

The International Olympic Committee initially attempted to sell broadcast rights for both the 2014 Winter Olympics and 2016 Summer Olympics as a package for the same price of $120 million it secured for the previous rights deal. However, it was forced to split the Winter games with broadcasters unwilling to meet the IOC's demands. It follows Nine losing up to $30 million on the 2012 Olympics as well as increasing costs of rights to domestic sports. Network Ten paid $20 million for the 2014 Winter Games. Its flagship nightly program was Sochi Tonight, and it marked the first time a network used a multichannel to air Olympic content, with ONE airing different content to the primary Ten channel.

In 2014, the IOC announced it had signed a deal estimated to be worth up to $170 million with the Seven Network to broadcast the following three Olympics, the 2016 and 2020 Summer and 2018 Winter Games. The 2016 Games was the first time a free to air broadcaster used two multichannels (7Two and 7mate) to air Olympic content in addition to their primary channel. It was also the first time a paid streaming service was made available, with a $19.95 premium app being offered.

=== 2020's ===
In 2023, Channel 9 announced they had signed a deal for $305 million for exclusive broadcast rights of the Olympics until the 2032 Summer Olympics, these rights included both the Summer and Winter Olympics along with broadcast rights for the Paralympics.

== Broadcasters ==
Year	Host	Broadcaster	Cost of rights	Ref
1956 Summer	Melbourne	ABC	—N/a	
1960 Summer	Rome	ABC	—N/a	
1964 Summer	Tokyo	ABC	—N/a	
1968 Summer	Mexico City	ABC	—N/a	
1972 Summer	Munich	ABC	—N/a	
1976 Summer	Montreal	ABC	—N/a	
1980 Winter	Lake Placid	Seven	—N/a	
1980 Summer	Moscow	Seven	—N/a	
1984 Winter	Sarajevo	Nine	—N/a	
1984 Summer	Los Angeles	10	—N/a	
1988 Winter	Calgary	Nine	—N/a	
1988 Summer	Seoul	10	—N/a	
1992 Winter	Albertville	Nine	—N/a	
1992 Summer	Barcelona	Seven	—N/a	
1994 Winter	Lillehammer	Nine	—N/a	
1996 Summer	Atlanta	Seven	—N/a	
1998 Winter	Nagano	Seven	—N/a	
2000 Summer	Sydney	Seven	—N/a	
2002 Winter	Salt Lake City	Seven	—N/a	
2004 Summer	Athens	Seven/SBS	—N/a	
2006 Winter	Turin	Seven	$71 million	
2008 Summer	Beijing	Seven/SBS	$71 million	
2010 Winter	Vancouver	Nine/Foxtel	$120 million	
2012 Summer	London	Nine/Foxtel	$120 million	
2014 Winter	Sochi	10	$20 million	
2016 Summer	Rio de Janeiro	Seven	$150-$170 million	
2018 Winter	Pyeongchang	Seven	$150-$170 million	
2020 Summer	Tokyo	Seven	$150-$170 million	
2022 Winter	Beijing	Seven	$150-$170 million	
2024 Summer	Paris	Nine	$305 million	
2026 Winter	Milan–Cortina d'Ampezzo	Nine	$305 million	
2028 Summer	Los Angeles	Nine	$305 million	
2030 Winter	French Alps	Nine	$305 million	
2032 Summer	Brisbane	Nine	$305 million	

== See also ==
- Olympics on television
- Olympics on Seven
- Olympics on Nine
- Olympics on Ten
