= Greg Stump =

American freestyle ski champion, filmmaker, and music video director

Greg Stump (born September 4, 1960) is an American champion skier, ski and snowboarding filmmaker, and music video director.

== Early ski career ==
Born in San Diego, his family then moved to Maine where Greg learned to ski at nearby Pleasant Mountain. He was the U.S. national junior freestyle champion in 1978. In 1979 he won the North American Freestyle Championships at Edelweiss Valley in Quebec, Canada. He spent two years on the professional freestyle circuit. He was a skier in films made by Dick Barrymore, particularly Vagabond Skier shot in New Zealand in 1979. That was Barrymore's last ski film and Greg Stump went on to appear in two ski films by Warren Miller.

== Ski film maker ==
In 1983 Greg Stump began to make his own ski films. There were several aspects of these films that set them apart from previous ski movies. First, the sound tracks, and in particular the use of music of artists signed to the ZTT Records label. Second the narrative style of Greg Stump. Third the use of snowboarders in a skiing film.

In 1991 Greg Stump made a series for Fox television "Greg Stump's World of Extremes". A notable episode of that series was Ace Mackay-Smith Ski Bum 1992

In 1999 Greg Stump was honored by Skiing magazine as one of the twenty-five most influential people in skiing of all time, and named to the Maine Ski Hall of Fame in 2004.

Subsequently, Greg Stump has moved away from making skiing movies, and has become involved in making commercials, and music videos.

On March 26, 2022 Greg Stump was inducted into the US Ski and Snowboard Hall of Fame, Class of 2020 at a ceremony in Sun Valley, Idaho.

== Filmography ==
- The Droids (1984)
- Time Waits For Snowman (1985)
- Maltese Flamingo, The Ski Movie That Flew The Coop (1986)
- The Good, The Rad & The Gnarly (1987)
- Blizzard of Aahhh's (1988)
- License to Thrill (1989)
- Dr. Strange Glove (1990)
- Gonzo'd To Extremes (1990)
- How to thrill: the instructional video for aggressive skiers (1990)
- Groove Requiem: In The Key of Ski (1991)
- Greg Stump's "World of Extremes" (1991)
- Steep Techniques With Scot Schmidt (1991)
- The Skier's Guide to the Galaxy (1992)
- Sneaux Zone (1992)
- P-Tex, Lies, & Duct Tape (1993)
- Snow Vibrations (1994)
- Pulp Traction (1995)
- Siberia (1996)
- Fistful of Moguls (1998)
- Something about Whistler (2001)
- Something Else About Whistler (2002)
- Color of White (2002)
- Aspen: The Power of Four (2003)
- Legend Of Aahhh’s (2012)
- Fade to Winter (2015) as narrator

These films feature early appearances by Glen Plake and Scot Schmidt.
