= Poor Boyz Productions =

North American entertainment company

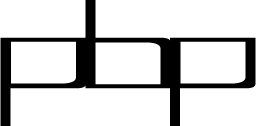
- Company type: Private
- Industry: Motion pictures, family entertainment, Freestyle Skiing Media Production
- Founded: 1994 (Redondo Beach, California as Poor Boyz Productions)
- Founder: Johnny Decesare
- Headquarters: Redondo Beach, California, United States
- Area served: North America; Canada
- Key people: Johnny Decesare
- Website: www.poorboyz.com

Poor Boyz Productions is a North American entertainment company which specializes on Freeskiing, Wind surfing and Standup paddleboarding films. The company was formed in 1994 by Johnny Decesare and is headquartered in Redondo Beach, California. In 2012 Poor Boyz began producing freeskiing videos in association with Red Bull Media House.

== History ==
Poor Boyz Productions was founded in 1994 by Johnny Decesare. Using an 8mm camera, Poor Boyz Productions first film, Fade to Black, was filmed over the next two years and released in 1996.

The studio's next film, Degenerates featured the skiing of JP Auclair, J.F. Cusson and Mike Douglas. Auclair appeared in ten of the company's films before his death in an avalanche in 2014.

In 2005, Poor Boyz Productions began filming "The Windsurfing Movie". This movie included windsurfers Levi Siver, Jason Polakow, Kai Lenny and Robby Naish. "The Windsurfing Movie" premiered in Hollywood on July 15, 2008. The company later released two more windsurfing films.

Poor Boyz Productions released freestyle ski movies every year until 2015. The films have a variety of themes, including street skiing. Some of the skiers featured in Poor Boyz Productions films have won IF3 International Freeski Film Festival or Powder Awards, for their segments in Poor Boyz films.

In 2014 the company created films of two California stand up paddleboard surfing competitions, one of which aired on CBS Sports, and in 2015 made a stand up paddle surfing movie in Maui.

== Awards ==
- "War" - 2006 Movie of the Year - Powder Magazine Awards
- “YEAH DUDE!” - 2007 IF3 People's Choice Award
- “Reasons” - 2008 iF3 Best Film - Pro Category
- “Every Day Is A Saturday” - 2009 iF3 Best Film - Pro Film Category
- "Reasons" - 2009 Movie of the Year - Powder Magazine Awards
- “The Grand Bizarre” - 2011 iF3 Best Film - Pro Film Category
- The SUP Movie, 2015 - SUP Best film

== Freeskiing Films ==
- "Fade to Black" - 1996
- "State of Mind" - 1997
- "Degenerates" - 1998
- "13" - 1999*
- "The Game" - 2000
- "Propaganda" - 2001
- "Happy Dayz" - 2002
- "Stereotype" - 2002
- "Ready, Fire, Aim" - 2003
- "Session 1242" - 2003
- "X=10" - 2004
- "WSKI" - 2004
- "War" - 2005
- "Pop Yer Bottlez" - 2005
- "Safety Meeting" - 2005
- "Ski Porn" - 2006
- "Photo Play" - 2006
- "Yeah Dude" - 2007
- "Idea" - 2007
- "PNW" - 2007
- "Reasons" - 2008
- "Journal" - 2008
- "Everyday is a Saturday" - 2009
- "Jib Jam 2" - 2009
- "Revolver" - 2010
- "The GRand Bizarre" - 2011
- "WE: A Collection of Individuals" - 2012
- "Tracing Skylines" - 2013

== Windsurfing and other films ==
- "The Windsurfing Movie II" -2009
- "Video Evidence"
- "The Windsurfing Movie" - 2007
- "The SUP Movie" - 2015
- "Paradigm Lost" - 2017
