= IF3 International Freeski Film Festival =

iF3 Festival
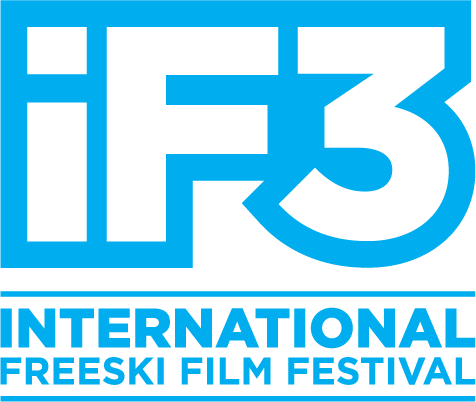
- Location: Montreal, Quebec, Canada
- Founded: 2007
- Language: French; English
- Website: www.if3festival.com

The International Freesports Film Festival (iF3) is a film Festival dedicated to screening and rewarding freeskiing and snowboarding movies. Held annually at the end of October in Montreal, iF3 was created in 2007 by Félix Rioux, Doug Bishop and Jean-Francis Durocher. As it premieres the best movies of the past season, iF3 has been referred to as the "Cannes of the ski world!" by ESPN and won Quebec action sports Gala Maestro's event of the year in 2010.

== History ==
=== Origins and purpose ===
iF3 stemmed from its founders’ will to unite all elements that compose freeskiing culture in one place, such as ski cinematography, producers, athletes, photography, brands, music, art and parties. The stated mission of the festival is to, recognize the best of what the freeski community has to offer through innovative and entertaining media and events in order to unite sport with culture and expand it to new levels. Each year athletes, filmmakers, industry leaders and ski enthusiasts get together for a long weekend of celebration, kicking off the upcoming season.

=== Key players ===
The International Freeski Film Festival (iF3) was created in 2007 by ski industry veterans: professional photographer Félix Rioux, Newschoolers publisher Doug Bishop, and Bite Size Entertainment's Jean-Francis Durocher. In 2009, after the third edition of the festival, Bishop left the team, followed by Jean-Francis Durocher in 2011. Luc "Skypowder" is currently the President of the festival.

=== Evolution ===
Gradually, iF3 became the biggest gathering of independent movie productions in skiing and draws producers, athletes, and event attendees from more than 20 countries. Both fan participation and video submission have increased every year since inception. The roster has grown from 11 professional and 5 amateur entries in 2007 for the first edition to over 120 professional and amateur films, shorts, and documentaries in 2022. The festival expanded to snowboarding in 2017 and mountain biking in 2021.

== iF3 Movie Awards ==
=== Ceremonies ===
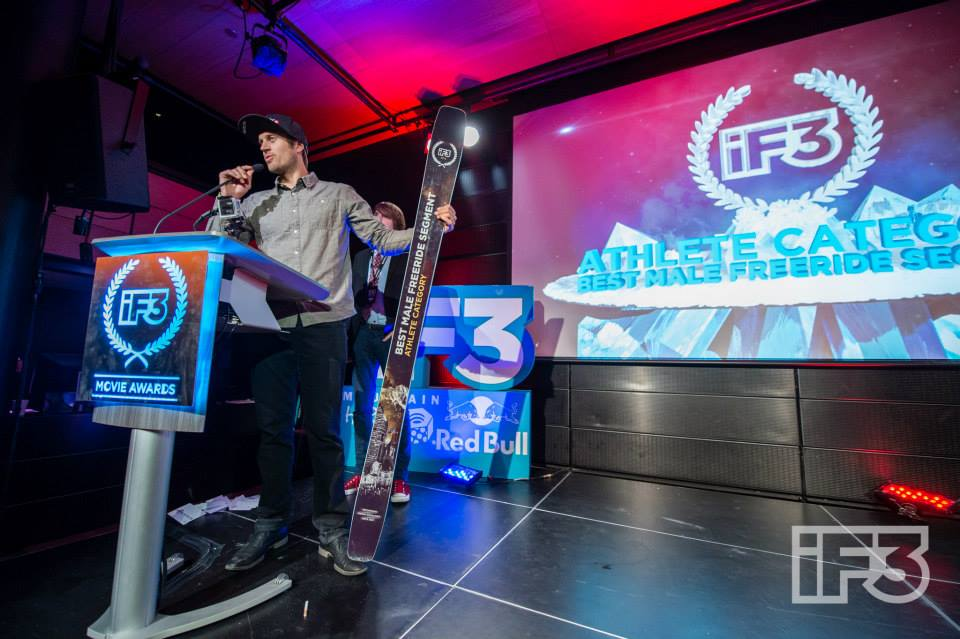
iF3 2014 Awards Ceremony

The iF3 Movie Awards ceremonies show venue in Whistler. An international jury panel reviews all the movies submitted online prior to the event, and the awards to be announced and given during the festival in Montreal. The film producers, production teams and athletes who win receive an emblematic trophy known as the iF3 Palm alongside various gifts. In 2023, the iF3 Movie Awards will take place on Saturday October 21, in Whistler .

In 2021, iF3 extended the Movie Awards Gala to the Mountain Bike. The first ever Mountain Bike Movie Awards Gala took place in Vancouver.

=== Categories ===
Recurrent categories:

Professional Category (Ski / Snowboard)

- Film of the Year
- Best Cinematography
- Best Editing
- Best Short Movie (10-30min)

Specific production companies are invited by iF3 to submit their films to the professional category, but submissions from additional production companies are also accepted.

Characteristics of the professional category:

- Professionally athletes
- Significant external funding and sponsorship
- Professional cinematographers
- Professional editing
- The revenue and sponsorship income are sufficient to financially support the parties involved
- The production company is run as a business

Amateur Category (Ski / Snowboard)

- Film Of The Year
- Best Cinematography

Characteristics of the amateur category:

- Athlete sponsorship is not a requirement
- Relatively small external funding, if any
- Relatively small distribution, if any.
- Revenue and sponsorship income is insufficient or barely sufficient to financially support the parties involved.
- The film cannot exceed 40 minutes

Athlete Category ( Ski / Snowboard)

- Best Female Performance
- Best Male Street Segment
- Best Male Freeride Segment
- Discovery of the year

Open Category (Ski & Snowboard movies)

- Best Big Mountain Film
- Best Urban Movie
- Best Storytelling
- Bern Best Crash
- Jury's Pick
- Best Short Video (under 10min)

== European edition ==
iF3 Europe in Annecy was the first iF3 to take place outside of Montreal at the end of September 2010. In 2014, following the expansion of the event worldwide, Like That Agency, the agency holding the licence of the European edition, organized its own event, the High Five Festival.

The iF3 France is now taking place in Chamonix Mont-Blanc since 2021. The third edition will take place November 30 to December 2, 2023.

== World Tour ==
In addition, iF3 has organized events in several other cities including Innsbruck, Le Massif, London, Mont-Tremblant, Amsterdam, Tokyo, Santiago, Stockholm and Whistler. In 2023 the festival will be taking place in Santiago, Chile in July 2023, in Montreal, Québec September 30 to October 1, 2023, in Whistler October 18–21, 2023 and in Chamonix, France November 30 to December 2, 2023.
