= Nine Network Olympic broadcasts =

Australian broadcasts of the Olympic Games

- Genre: Olympics telecasts
- Country of origin: Australia
- Original language: English

Production
- Production locations: Various Olympic venues (event telecasts and studio segments)
- Camera setup: Multi-camera
- Running time: Varies

Original release
- Network: Nine Network; Stan Sport
- Release: 1956 – 1976
- Release: 13 February 2010 – 13 August 2012
- Release: 27 July 2024 – present

Related
- Seven Olympics (1992–2008, 2016–2021); Seven Olympics (1998–2006, 2018–2022); Seven Olympics (1992–2008, 2016–2021); Ten Olympics (1984, 1988, 2014)

The broadcasts of the Olympic Games produced by Nine's Wide World of Sports is televised on the Nine Network (9Gem, 9Go and Channel Nine) and Stan Sport in Australia. For the Olympics, the network broadcast the 2024 Summer Games in Paris, France. Its last Olympics broadcast prior to the 2023 deal from the IOC, was the 2012 Summer Games in London, United Kingdom.

== History ==
On 13 October 2007, the International Olympic Committee announced that the Nine Network, in joint partnership with subscription television provider Foxtel, secured broadcasting rights for the 2010 Winter Olympics and the 2012 Summer Olympics in Australia in a deal worth more than AU$110 million.

On 8 February 2023, Nine was announced by the International Olympic Committee as the exclusive Australian Olympics broadcaster for Paris 2024, Milan-Cortina 2026, Los Angeles 2028, Winter Olympics 2030 and Brisbane 2032 in a deal worth AU$305 million, which includes Nine's talk radio stations and Nine's newspapers (The Sydney Morning Herald, The Age, Brisbane Times and WAtoday). and its subscription streaming service Stan under the Stan Sport section. This comes after rivals Seven Network lost the Olympic rights in December 2022.

=== Broadcast rights history ===
Sport	Event	Date	Reference
Summer Olympic Games	Melbourne 1956, Montreal 1976, London 2012, Paris 2024, Los Angeles 2028, Brisbane 2032	1956, 1976, 2012, 2024, 2028, 2032	
Winter Olympic Games	Sarajevo 1984, Calgary 1988, Albertville 1992, Lillehammer 1994, Vancouver 2010, Milan-Cortina 2026, French Alps 2030	1984, 1988, 1992, 1994, 2010, 2026, 2030	

== Staff and commentators ==
=== 2012 London Olympics ===
Various Nine programs including Today, Mornings, Millionaire Hot Seat, The Footy Show, 60 Minutes and Australia's Funniest Home Videos went on hiatus during Nine's broadcast of the 2012 London Olympics. A daily highlights package London Gold aired at 9am weekdays following the live overnight coverage.

- Eddie McGuire
- Ken Sutcliffe
- Giaan Rooney
- James Brayshaw
- Mark Nicholas
- Ray Warren
- Garry Lyon
- Karl Stefanovic
- Leila McKinnon
- James Tomkins
- Kerri Pottharst
- Scott McGrory
- Debbie Watson
- Melinda Gainsford-Taylor
- Michael Slater
- Andrew Gaze
- Andrew Voss
- Grant Hackett
- Jane Flemming
- Cameron Williams
- Tim Sherridan
- Phil Liggett
- Tim Gilbert
- Simon O'Donnell
- Billy Brownless
- Tony Jones
- Peter Donegan
- Michael Thomson
- Daley Thompson
- Steve Ovett

=== 2024 Paris Olympics ===
Nine's staff and commentators for the 2024 Summer Olympics were announced on 1 July 2024. The full list was announced on 25 July 2024, which includes:

- Ally Langdon
- James Bracey
- Dylan Alcott
- Sarah Abo
- Karl Stefanovic
- Brooke Boney
- Alex Cullen
- Todd Woodbridge
- Leila McKinnon
- Eddie McGuire
- Roz Kelly
- Tony Jones
- Ian Thorpe
- Ellie Cole
- Mat Thompson
- Giaan Rooney
- Steve Hooker
- Dave Culbert
- Tamsyn Lewis-Manou
- Gerard Whateley
- Andrew Gaze
- Scott McGrory
- Phil Liggett
- Kate Bates
- Cadel Evans
- Drew Mitchell
- Sera Naiqama
- James Tomkins
- Kerri Pottharst
- Georgie Parker
- Caroline Buchanan
- Ryan Williams
- Mitch Tomlinson
- Sam Fricker
- Andy Raymond
- Grace Gill
- Emma Snowsill
- Will McCloy
- Peter Psaltis
- Adam Papalia
- Russell Mark
- Sean Maloney
- Annabelle Williams
- Matt Hill
- Will Davies
- Sophie Smith
- Shane McInnes
- Mark Taylor
- Jenna O'Hea

== See also ==
- Olympics on Seven
- Olympics on Ten
- Olympics on Australian television
- Australia at the Olympics
