= John Jay (filmmaker) =

American ski filmmaker

- Born: John Clarkson Jay IV; December 11, 1915; New York City, USA
- Died: December 7, 2000 (aged 84); Rancho Santa Fe, California
- Education: Williams College
- Occupation: ski filmmaker
- Website: johnjayskifilms.com

John Jay (1915–2000) was a pioneering American ski filmmaker. He helped fashion the ski film into its modern form, and shared his unique style in travel adventure lectures, books, and magazine articles for over sixty years. Jay was an early promoter of skiing, and his films captured the growth of the sport from early rope tows to helicopter skiing.

== Early life ==
John Jay was born December 11, 1915, in New York City, the son of a business executive. He attended St. Paul's School where he first learned to ski in 1932, and began filming with the family 16mm camera in 1934. He was a 1938 graduate of Williams College, and was then selected for a Rhodes Scholarship in 1939 but the war intervened.

== Film career ==
He was commissioned by Williams College, the Canadian Pacific Railway, and Panagra airline to produce promotional films in the late 1930s. His first feature film was Ski the Americas, North and South (1940).

During World War II he served as meteorologist, photographer and public relations officer with the 87th Mountain Infantry Battalion at Fort Lewis, Washington and later the 10th Mountain Division where he made training and recruiting films and evaluated equipment for winter warfare. Ski Patrol (1943), filmed in Sun Valley, was his second feature film and helped produce a wealth of new recruits. In late 1943 he was named Commanding Officer of the 10th Reconnaissance Troop. He wrote a History of the Mountain Training Center in 1944, which was released in 1948.

From 1946 to 1970 he resided at Williamstown, but traveled the world filming and presenting in lecture format a new ski film each year. He "virtually invented the ski film in its modern form," said prolific ski filmmaker Warren Miller.

== Works ==
=== Filmography ===
- Sons of Eph (1937) short
- Skis over Skoki (1939) short
- Ski the Americas, North and South (1940)
- South for Snow (1941)
- Ski Here, Señor (1941)
- They Climb to Conquer (1942)
- Ski Patrol (1943)
- Hickory Holiday (1946)
- Skis in the Sky (1946)
- Singing Skis (1947)
- Skis over Europe (1949)
- From the Alps to the Andes (1950)
- Skis Against Time (1951)
- Winter Wonders (1951) short
- Olympic Victory (1952)
- Alpine Safari/Winter Paradise (1953) short
- Calvalcade on Skis (1954)
- From Ski to Sea (1955)
- Holiday on Skis (1956)
- Great White World (1957)
- Ski to Adventure (1958)
- White Flight (1959)
- Mountain Magic (1960)
- Olympic Holiday (1961)
- Once Upon an Alp (1962)
- Stars in the Snow (1963)
- Catch a Skiing Star (1964)
- Persian Powder (1965)
- Silver Skis (1966)
- An Evening with John Jay (1966)
- Head for the Hills (1968)
- World of Skiing (1970)
- Skiing is (1971)
- Swiss on White (1975)
- Winter Magic Around the World (1946-1970) (1976)
- Ski Down the Years: 1930s-1960s (1993)

=== Bibliography ===
- Jay, John (1944/1948) History of the Mountain Training Center Army Ground Forces. Study Number 24 ADA955065
- Jay, John (1947) Skiing the Americas New York: Macmillan Co. reprint ISBN 9781258387181
- Jay, John C.; O'Rear, John & Frankie (1966) Ski Down the Years New York: Award House OCLC 1577645

== Recognition ==
His 1952 film, Alpine Safari, was nominated for an Oscar in the short-subject category and later became a Warner Bros. release under the title Winter Paradise.

In 1981 he was inducted into the US National Ski Hall of Fame. In 1997 the International Skiing History Association presented him with a Lifetime Achievement Award. He was named one of the 100 most influential skiers of all time by Ski magazine in 1999.

John Jay was the great great great grandson of John Jay, the fifth president of the Continental Congress and the first Chief Justice of the United States.
