= List of Australian television ratings for 2000 =

The following is a list of Australian television ratings for the year 2000.

== Network shares – 2000 ==
Market	Network shares
Market	ABC	Seven	Nine	Ten	SBS
5 cities	14.8%	32.2%	31.0%	18.5%	3.4%
Sydney	15.8%	31.3%	30.8%	18.6%	3.5%
Melbourne	13.7%	32.0%	32.1%	19.2%	3.1%
Brisbane	15.6%	31.8%	31.5%	17.4%	3.7%
Adelaide	13.0%	33.7%	32.1%	18.0%	3.2%
Perth	16.0%	34.5%	27.1%	18.8%	3.6%

* Data Gathered by then Ratings Supplier: A.C Neilsen Australia

== Most watched broadcasts – 2000 ==
- Data based on the five Metropolitan markets only.

Rank	Broadcast	Genre	Date	Network	Audience
1	2000 Sydney Olympics Closing Ceremony	Sport	1 October 2000	7	6,641,000
2	2000 Sydney Olympics Opening Ceremony	Sport	15 September 2000	7	6,518,000
3	2000 Sydney Olympics Reflections	Sport	—N/a	7	4,156,000
4	Seven News (Sunday)	News	1 October 2000	7	4,066,000
5	2000 Sydney Olympics DAY 10 Primetime	Sport	25 September 2000	7	3,984,000
6	2000 Sydney Olympics DAY 3 Primetime	Sport	18 September 2000	7	3,963,000
7	2000 Sydney Olympics DAY 4 Primetime	Sport	19 September 2000	7	3,908,000
8	2000 Sydney Olympics DAY 1 Primetime	Sport	16 September 2000	7	3,755,000
9	2000 Sydney Olympics DAY 2 Primetime	Sport	17 September 2000	7	3,644,000
10	Who Wants to Be a Millionaire? (Monday)	Game Show	28 August 2000	9	3,516,000
11	2000 Sydney Olympics DAY 5 Primetime	Sport	20 September 2000	7	3,484,000
12	2000 Sydney Olympics DAY 6 Primetime	Sport	21 September 2000	7	3,332,000
13	2000 Sydney Olympics DAY 7 Primetime	Sport	22 September 2000	7	3,313,000
14	2000 Sydney Olympics DAY 8 Primetime	Sport	23 September 2000	7	3,305,000
15	Seven News (Sunday)	News	17 September 2000	7	3,234,000
16	2000 Sydney Olympics DAY 9 Primetime	Sport	24 September 2000	7	3,232,000
17	2000 Sydney Olympics DAY 8 Primetime	Sport	23 September 2000	7	3,124,000
18	2000 Sydney Olympics DAY 13 Primetime	Sport	28 September 2000	7	3,117,000
19	2000 Sydney Olympics DAY 12 Primetime	Sport	27 September 2000	7	3,089,000
20	Seven News (Sunday)	News	24 September 2000	7	3,031,000

== Top rating regular programmes – 2000 ==
- Data based on the five Metropolitan markets only.

Rank	Programme	Network	Timeslot	Audience
1	Friends	9	Monday 7.30PM	2,340,000
2	Backyard Blitz	9	Sunday 6.30PM	2,161,000
3	Popstars	7	Sunday 6.30PM	2,088,000
4	Spin City	9	Monday 8.00PM	2,049,000
5	Who Wants to Be a Millionaire?	9	Monday 8.30PM	1,967,000
6	ER	9	Thursday 8.30PM	1,903,000
7	Maneaters	9	Sunday 7.00PM	1,885,000
8	This Is Your Life	9	Thursday 8.30PM	1,853,000
9	The Great Outdoors	7	Tuesday 8.00PM	1,844,000
10	National Nine News Sunday	9	Sunday 6.00PM	1,843,000

== Weekly ratings – 2000 ==
- Data based on the five Metropolitan markets only.

Week	Network shares					Top programs
Week	ABC TV	Seven	Nine	Ten	SBS TV	Top programs
7	16.8%	29.1%	30.5%	19.9%	3.7%	Nine Network – Friends (2,393,000); Seven Network – Blue Heelers (1,991,000); Nine Network – Spin City (1,929,000); Seven Network – Movie Liar Liar (1,846,000); Seven Network – Popstars (1,780,000)
8	17.1%	27.7%	32.2%	19.5%	3.6%	Nine Network – Friends (2,204,000); Seven Network – Blue Heelers (2,093,000); Seven Network – Popstars (1,901,000); Nine Network – ER (1,791,000); Nine Network – Spin City (1,766,000)
9	16.0%	30.1%	31.8%	18.6%	3.5%	Nine Network – Friends (2,315,000); Seven Network – Blue Heelers (2,054,000); Nine Network – Spin City (2,025,000); Seven Network – Popstars (1,961,000); Nine Network – ER (1,913,000)
10
11
12
13
14
15
16
17
18
19
20
21
22
23
24
25
26
27
28
29
30
31
32
33
34
35
36
37	15.9%	28.7%	33.4%	18.3%	3.7%	Nine Network – Who Wants to Be a Millionaire? (3,516,000); Nine Network – Spin City (2,553,000); Seven Network – Movie Con Air (2,165,000); Nine Network – Burke's Backyard (1,939,000); Nine Network – This Is Your Life (1,897,000)
38	12.3%	50.4%	20.6%	13.7%	3.0%	Seven Network – 2000 Summer Olympics opening ceremony (6,518,000); Seven Network – 2000 Olympics Day 1 Evening (2,553,000); Seven Network – Seven News Saturday (2,918,000); Seven Network – 2000 Olympics Day 1 (2,279,000); Seven Network – 2000 Olympics Day 1 (2,259,000)
39	8.8%	66.6%	12.3%	10.2%	2.1%	Seven Network – 2000 Olympics Day 3 Evening (3,963,000); Seven Network – 2000 Olympics Day 4 Evening (3,908,000); Seven Network – 2000 Olympics Day 2 Evening (3,644,000); Seven Network – 2000 Olympics Day 5 Evening (3,484,000); Seven Network – 2000 Olympics Day 6 Evening (3,332,000)
40	8.7%	63.0%	13.7%	12.3%	2.3%	Seven Network – 2000 Olympics Day 10 Evening (3,984,000); Seven Network – 2000 Olympics Day 9 Evening (3,232,000); Seven Network – 2000 Olympics Day 13 Evening (3,117,000); Seven Network – 2000 Olympics Day 12 Evening (3,089,000); Seven Network – Seven News Sunday (3,031,000)
41	12.4%	45.4%	22.1%	17.3%	2.8%	Seven Network – 2000 Summer Olympics closing ceremony (6,641,000); Seven Network – 2000 Olympics Reflections Day 9 (4,156,000); Seven Network – Seven News Sunday (4,066,000); Seven Network – Better Homes And Gardens Special (2,426,000); Seven Network – 2000 Olympics Day 16 Afternoon (2,322,000)
42	14.9%	27.5%	35.0%	18.8%	3.8%	Nine Network – Friends (2,547,000); Nine Network – Renovation Rescue (2,323,000); Nine Network – Burke's Backyard (2,090,000); Nine Network – Backyard Blitz (2,076,000); Nine Network – Who Wants to Be a Millionaire? Celebrity Edition (2,056,000)
43	20.0%	26.9%	29.9%	19.6%	3.7%	ABC Television – 2000 Paralympics Opening Ceremony (2,294,000); Nine Network – Burke's Backyard (1,906,000); Nine Network – This Is Your Life (1,893,000); Nine Network – Backyard Blitz (1,879,000); Seven Network – Hot Auctions (1,861,000)
44	19.6%	28.0%	29.7%	18.8%	3.8%	Seven Network – Better Homes And Gardens (2,294,000); Seven Network – Hot Auctions (1,884,000); Seven Network – Ground Force (1,881,000); Nine Network – Burke's Backyard (1,833,000); Nine Network – Who Wants to Be a Millionaire? (1,819,000)
45	18.7%	28.4%	30.1%	19.3%	3.6%	ABC Television – 2000 Paralympics Closing Ceremony (2,152,000); Seven Network – Harry's Practice Special (1,912,000); Nine Network – This Is Your Life (1,906,000); Seven Network – Ground Force (1,829,000); Seven Network – Hot Auctions (1,819,000)
46	16.9%	28.8%	31.1%	18.8%	4.4%	Nine Network – Backyard Blitz (1,879,000); Nine Network – Who Wants to Be a Millionaire? (1,847,000); Nine Network – Surprise, Surprise (1,806,000); Seven Network – Hot Auctions (1,750,000); Nine Network – Burke's Backyard (1,750,000)
47
48
