= Network 10 Olympic broadcasts =

- Genre: Olympics telecasts
- Country of origin: Australia
- Original language: English
- No. of seasons: 3

Production
- Production locations: Various Olympic venues (event telecasts and studio segments)
- Camera setup: Multi-camera
- Running time: Varies

Original release
- Network: Network Ten
- Release: 29 July 1984 – 3 October 1988
- Release: 8 February – 24 February 2014

Related
- Nine Summer Olympics (1956, 1976, 2012, 2024–present); Nine Winter Olympics (1992, 1994, 2010, 2026–present); Seven Summer Olympics (1992–2008, 2016–2021); Seven Winter Olympics (1998–2006, 2018–2022)

The broadcast network Network Ten has televised the Olympic Games three times in Australia. Ten first televised the Winter Olympic Games in 2014 and the Summer Olympic Games in 1984.

== Overview ==
Network Ten had exclusive Australian free-to-air, online and mobile telephony broadcast rights to the 2014 Winter Olympics in Sochi, the live telecast of the XXII Olympiad.

On 14 May 2013, the International Olympic Committee announced that Network Ten had secured broadcasting rights for the 2014 Winter Olympics, for A$20 million. Its flagship nightly program was Sochi Tonight, and it marked the first time a network used a multichannel to air Olympic content, with ONE airing different content to the primary Ten channel.

=== Broadcast rights history ===
Sport	Event	Date	Reason/Subsequent Broadcasters
Summer Olympics	Los Angeles 1984, Seoul 1988	1984, 1988	
Winter Olympics	Sochi 2014	2014	

== Staff and Commentators ==
=== 2014 Winter Olympics ===
- Stephen Quartermain
- Mel McLaughlin
- Alisa Camplin
- Brad McEwan
- Greg Rust
- Nicole Livingstone
- Steven Bradbury
- Steven Lee
- Dave Culbert
- Steph Hickey
- Mitch Tomlinson
- Luke Kneller
- Michael Kennedy
- Lachie Reid
- Rob Waters
- Mark Howard
- Magdalena Roze
- Nuala Hafner
- Mazoe Ford
- Danielle Isdale
- Scott Mackinnon
- Matt Doran
- Melinda Nucifora
- Max Futcher
- Roy and HG

== See also ==
- Olympics on Nine
- Olympics on Seven
- Olympics on Australian television
- Australia at the Olympics
