= Romolo Marcellini =

Italian film director (1910–1999)

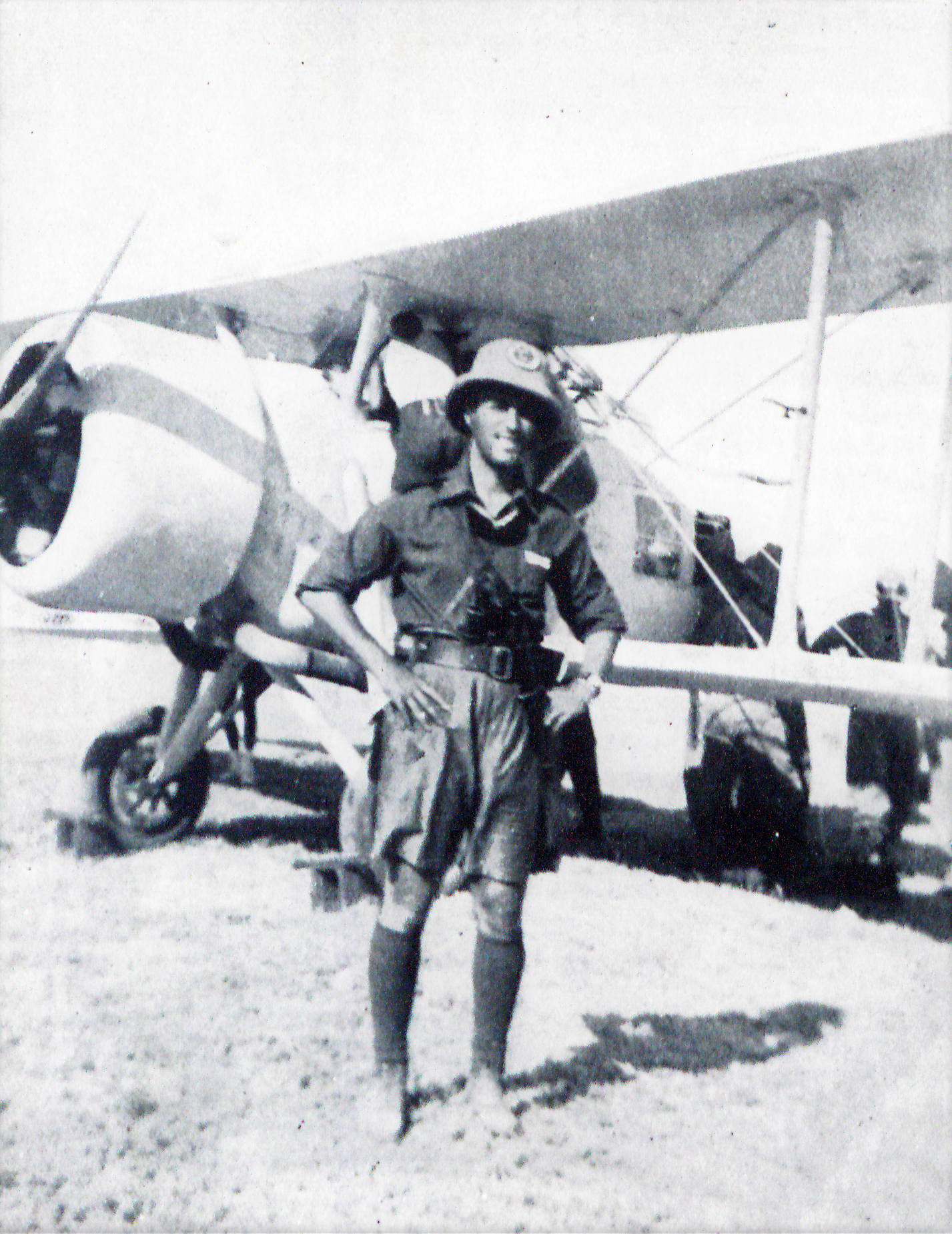
- Born: 6 October 1910; Montecosaro, Italy
- Died: 3 June 1999 (aged 88)
- Occupations: Film director Screenwriter
- Years active: 1937-1969

Romolo Marcellini (6 October 1910 – 3 June 1999) was an Italian film director and screenwriter. He directed 22 films between 1937 and 1969.

== Selected filmography ==
- Stadium (1934)
- Sentinels of Bronze (1937)
- Special Correspondents (1943)
- A Tale of Five Cities (1951)
- Rommel's Treasure (1955)
- Engaged to Death (1957)
- The Grand Olympics (1961)
