= XIVth Olympiad: The Glory of Sport =

Official film of the 1948 Olympic Games

- Directed by: Castleton Knight
- Written by: Joseph Lerner
- Produced by: Castleton Knight
- Narrated by: John Snagge, Harold Abrahams, Stewart MacPherson, Raymond Glendenning, Robert Robinson, Bill Stern, Ted Husing
- Cinematography: As supervising cameraman (Greece, St. Moritz): Stanley W. Sayer
- Edited by: Roy Drew
- Music by: Guy Warrack
- Production company: Rank Organisation / Olympic Games (1948) Film Company
- Distributed by: General Film Distributors, UK/Eagle-Lion, US
- Release date: 2 September 1948
- Country: United Kingdom
- Language: English
- Budget: £250000

XIVth Olympiad: The Glory of Sport was the official film of the 1948 Olympic Games held at St. Moritz (Winter Games) and London (Summer Games). It was premiered on 2 September 1948. The film is notable as being the first official Olympic Games to be filmed in colour.

== Background ==
J Arthur Rank, head of The Rank Organisation paid £25000 for the exclusive film rights of the games. He envisioned a full-length feature film on the lines of Leni Riefenstahl's film of the Berlin Olympics of 1936, Olympia, but unlike the earlier film which took two years to finish, Rank planned to have his completed film in cinemas within three weeks. Furthermore, it was to be in Colour. Vigorous protests from British and American newsreel companies forced Rank to concede the exclusive newsreel rights.

The Rank Organisation's newsreel division was Gaumont-British and its managing director was Castleton Knight. Rank formed the Olympic Games (1948) Film Company, putting Knight in charge of the production with a budget of £250000.

== Logistics ==
Technicolor Ltd had been formed in 1936 in London and received four bulky three-strip Technicolor cameras from the parent Technicolor Corporation; in 1948, these cameras were in continuous use. Consequently, the Winter Games were filmed using Technicolor Monopack, which could be used in normal 35mm studio or newsreel cameras. Technicolor Monopack, a version of Kodachrome reversal film, had to be processed in the USA, so it could not be used for the Summer Games because of the additional time it would have taken to process it, thus delaying the film's premiere. Instead, 20 Newall cameras, UK-built copies of the Mitchell Camera, were fitted with bipack magazines and gates, the process being dubbed "Technichrome". The Summer Games were filmed in Technichrome except for the opening and closing ceremonies and some inserts which were filmed with three-strip Technicolor cameras, commandeered from the sets of The Blue Lagoon and Christopher Columbus.

== Film Contents ==
- Staged Torch Lighting Ceremony and Torch Relay in Greece (Technichrome)
- 1948 Winter Olympic Games at St. Moritz (Technicolor Monopack)
- Opening Ceremony of the 1948 Summer Games at the Empire Stadium, Wembley (Three-strip Technicolor)
- Athletics (Technichrome)
- Sailing at Torquay (Technichrome)
- Cycling at Herne Hill Velodrome and Windsor Great Park (Technichrome)
- Rowing at Henley on Thames (Technichrome)
- Equestrian at The Empire Stadium (Technichrome)
- Diving and Swimming at the Empire Pool, Wembley (Technichrome)
- Marathon (Technichrome)
- Closing Ceremony (Three-strip Technicolor)

== Production ==
The torch lighting ceremony and relay in Greece were especially staged for the film and were not of the actual events on and after 17 July 1948. Both actual ceremony and relay, and the staged reconstruction proved difficult because Greece was engaged in a civil war at the time. This segment of the film was filmed by a single crew using a Technichrome bipack camera. To enhance the limited palette of the bipack photography, the principal “goddesses” wore white, blue and orange robes. The fuel in the torches was changed from gas to solid in order to produce prominent white smoke. Though the film narrative implies that the torch was relayed to St. Moritz for the Winter Games, the torch for the Winter Games was actually lit at St. Moritz.

After a staged torch relay with athletes running through some Ancient Greek ruins, the Greek Technichrome sequence cuts to a clip in three-strip Technicolor of an Olympic Games flag being waved against a deep blue sky. The Winter Games sequence which followed were filmed by two crews using Technicolor Monopack. The supervising cameraman on both the Greek and Swiss locations was Technicolor cameraman Stanley W. Sayer.

After another flag-waving clip, the action moved to England for the Summer Games. The opening and closing ceremonies at Wembley were filmed in three-strip Technicolor though the actual sports themselves were filmed by a crew of 75 using 20 Technichrome cameras. These cameras were modified Newall cameras, British-built copies of the Mitchell camera.

== Post-production ==
The Technicolor Monopack footage of the Winter Games was processed in Hollywood and returned to Technicolor Ltd in London.

The editing of the Summer Games began on the day after they started and between ten and twenty thousand feet had to be dealt with daily. In less than a month 20,000 ft. had been finally edited.

The film was eventually commentated in a number of languages, but priority was given to the British, American and Dutch versions.

The music by Guy Warrack was composed and recorded before the Games started, and had either to be adapted to the film, or the picture cut to suit the music.

== Release ==
The completed film ran for two hours and 10 minutes; it opened in London on 20 September 1948 and four days later as "The 1948 Olympic Games" in New York.

The film was credited as "Colour by Technicolor" and made no mention of Monopack or Technichrome. The producers were well aware that filming in three different colour processes might attract adverse comment, especially of the limitations inherent in two-strip Technichrome with its restricted colour palette. Castleton Knight was upbeat on 24 November 1948: "I think it is remarkable that not one of the many thousands of press notices even hinted that there had been more than one colour process used, although we used several devices in order that the public would not notice the changes. For instance, we cut from the wonderful scene at Wembley on the opening day, where the grass was a really beautiful shade of green, to a close-up of the discus-thrower, on whom attention was immediately concentrated, and not on the grass, which looked as though it had been burnt up during the previous day's heat wave."

The Illustrated London News said, “Most worrying of all is the quality of the colour. This is a distinct throw-back to the earliest days of Technicolor. The Thames at Henley appears to be a startling and unbecoming heliotrope and the sky of an odd shade of pink which is like no sky I have ever seen in nature — something approaching the tent of the wild cuckoopint. The swimmers, too, disport in what seems to be fountain-pen ink, and the trees at Herne Hill look to my wondering gaze as though made of verdigris."

The Tatler commented: “There isn’t much fun about two and a quarter hours of newsreel glorified by Technicolor. That, I’m afraid is what XIVth Olympiad – The Glory of Sport amounts to in spite of the vainglorious title and a neo-Grecian opening capable surely of spreading popular illusion that the torch had never gone out all these centuries.”

== Restoration ==
The film was restored in 2011 from original materials held by the British Film Institute and other sources.
