= Dick Barrymore =

American documentary filmmaker

Dick Barrymore (October 21, 1933 in Los Angeles – August 1, 2008 in Ketchum, Idaho) was an American ski film maker of the 1960s and 1970s and an advocate of "hot dogging" (early freestyle skiing).

== Films ==
- Ski West, Young Man (1960)
- High Skis (1961)
- Some Like It Cold (1962)
- The White Search (1963)
- Winter Spell (1965)
- A Cool Breath of Fresh Air (1966)
- The Secret Race (1966)
- Last of the Ski Bums (1967)
- The Tenth Winter (1968)
- The Spider and the Frenchman (1969)
- Once in a Lifetime (1970)
- Here Come the K2 Skiers (1970)
- The Performers (1972) short
- Winter Heat (1973) short
- Day of Greatness (1974)
- Mountain High (1974)
- Assignment K2 (1975)
- White Horizons (1975)
- Blazing Skis (1976)
- High Cost of a Free Ride (1977)
- Wild Skis (1978)
- Vagabond Skiers (1979)
- Heli-Skiing (1979) short
- 20 Years of Skiing (1980)
- A Bit of Madness (1981) short
- Canadian Mountain Odyssey (1981) short
- Scandinavian Ski Safari (1987) short
- The Golden Years of Ski Films (1997)

== Books ==
- Barrymore, Dick (1997). Breaking Even. Missoula, Mont.: Pictorial Histories. ISBN 9781575100371. OCLC 39924562. Archived from the original on 11 December 2007. Memoir.

== See also ==
- Wet T-shirt contest—Barrymore claims to have held the first.
