= 16 Days of Glory =

1985 film

- Theatrical release poster
- Directed by: Bud Greenspan
- Produced by: Bud Greenspan
- Starring: Michael Gross; Carl Lewis
- Narrated by: David Perry
- Cinematography: Mike Chevalier; Chuck Cohen; Robert E. Collins; Gil Hubbs; Michael D. Margulies
- Edited by: Andrew Squicciarini
- Music by: Lee Holdridge
- Production companies: Cappy Productions; United States Olympic Committee
- Distributed by: Paramount Pictures
- Release dates: July 29, 1985 (Premiere); October 23, 1985 (United States)
- Running time: 145 minutes (theatrical); 284 minutes
- Country: United States
- Language: English
- Budget: $4 million
- Box office: $83,857 (United States)

16 Days of Glory is a 1985 documentary film about the 1984 Summer Olympics in Los Angeles, California, United States directed by Bud Greenspan. Among the athletes it profiles are Mary Lou Retton, Edwin Moses, Carl Lewis, Greg Louganis and Michael Groß.

== Synopsis ==
The 1984 Los Angeles Olympics are captured featuring narration by David Perry and the vocals of Plácido Domingo. It encompasses the entire spectrum of the Olympic Games, from the opening to the closing ceremonies.

== Production ==
In November 1982, 20th Century Fox acquired rights to document the 1984 Olympic Games, paying the International Olympic Committee $1 million in royalties for "exclusive film, cable, videocassette, disc and other exploitation rights." Fox then held a luncheon in February 1983 for 56 Olympic gold medallists, where they announced that Bud Greenspan had been hired to produce and direct the documentary, assigned a budget of $3 million, with his wife Cappy Petrash Greenspan serving as a writer and associate producer. Although the couple intended to immediately start interviewing athletes training for the games, Cappy died of cancer less than four months later on June 3, 1983; the documentary was dedicated to her memory.

By July 1984, apparently fearing that the budget would balloon over the allotted $3.5 million, Fox had transferred rights to the project to Greenspan and Milt Okun, each of whom reportedly funded $2.7 million out of their own pockets, with Greenspan deferring director's fees; the amount spent was revealed to be $1 million for film rights and an additional $4 million in production costs. Athletes were interviewed in eleven countries, and 150 technicians shot over 200 hours of footage spanning over a million feet of film using 18 cameras at the Olympic Games’ 21 Los Angeles area venues.

== Releases ==
There are multiple versions of the film, including a theatrical version running almost 2.5 hours, and a six-hour TV version that was shown on PBS as a six-part mini-series beginning July 20, 1988.

The film premiered at the Academy of Motion Picture Arts and Sciences' Samuel Goldwyn Theater in Beverly Hills, California on July 29, 1985. In February 1986, Paramount Pictures acquired distribution rights to the documentary. It had a two-week Oscar qualifying run at the Monica 4-Plex in Santa Monica, California beginning October 23, 1985, and opened in New York City on March 7, 1986, grossing $84,000. A ten-hour-long cut was also made, the second half of which premiered on the Disney Channel on June 20, 1987.
