= Bud Greenspan =

American film director, writer, and producer (1926–2010)

- Born: September 18, 1926; New York City, U.S.
- Died: December 25, 2010 (aged 84); New York City, U.S.
- Education: New York University
- Known for: Sports documentaries, especially Olympics
- Awards: Lifetime Achievement Award (Directors Guild of America and National Academy of Television Arts and Sciences), 1985 Olympic Order (International Olympic Committee)

Jonah J. "Bud" Greenspan (September 18, 1926 – December 25, 2010) was an American film director, writer, and producer known for his sports documentaries.

== Career ==
Greenspan was born in New York City. He overcame a lisp in adolescence and went into sports broadcasting after graduating from New York University. In 1947 Greenspan became sports director at New York City's WMGM, at that time the largest sports radio station in the US, when he was 21 years old. When he left WMGM, Greenspan began contributing articles to magazines while also producing television commercials.

He dabbled in documentary filmmaking in 1952, with The Strongest Man in the World, a 15-minute feature on weightlifter John Davis, but he began his filmmaking career in earnest in 1964, accompanying Jesse Owens to West Berlin to film Jesse Owens Returns to Berlin. In 1967, he formed his own film company, Cappy Productions, Inc., with wife Cappy Petrash Greenspan (deceased 1983). After his wife's death, Greenspan ran Cappy Productions with his companion Nancy Beffa.

Several hour-long productions followed. Greenspan won his first Emmy for 1976's The Olympiad, 22 hour-long documentary specials on the Olympics (including Jesse Owens Returns to Berlin). The series was broadcast in 80 countries. In 1977, he branched into docudrama with the two-hour movie of the week biography of gold-medalist Wilma Rudolph. Wilma, starring Cicely Tyson, featured Denzel Washington in his first movie role. In 1979, he launched the first of several vignette series: This Day in Sports, which aired on CBS, featured 365 30-second film shorts highlighting exciting sports moments from years past. It was followed in 1980 by the similar Olympic Moments, Olympic Events and Olympic Vignettes.

In addition to his prolific film work, Greenspan continued working in other media. He was a contributing editor for PARADE magazine. He also authored a number of books, including several on the Olympics, a book of sports bloopers called Play It Again, Bud, and We Wuz Robbed, which addresses sports controversies. Great Moments in Sports, his first album, went gold and led him to produce 18 more spoken word albums.

== Awards and recognition ==
Greenspan's work was recognized many times. He received Lifetime Achievement Awards from the Directors Guild of America in 1995 and from the National Academy of Television Arts and Sciences at the 2006 Annual Sports Emmy Awards. In 1996, he received a George Foster Peabody Award to recognize "distinguished and meritorious public service", cited as one of the industry's most prestigious awards.

Greenspan received the Olympic Order award in 1985, at which time International Olympic Committee President Juan Antonio Samaranch said, "Mr. Greenspan has been called the foremost producer, writer and director of Olympic films; more than that, he is an everlasting friend of the Olympic family." In 2004, Greenspan was inducted as a "Special Contributor" into the United States Olympic Hall of Fame. His visual and musical The Spirit of the Olympics is on display permanently at the Olympic Museum in Lausanne, Switzerland. In 1994, Greenspan was inducted in the International Jewish Sports Hall of Fame. In 2006, he was given the Al Schoenfield Media Award by the International Swimming Hall of Fame. Bud Greenspan Circuit, Lidcombe, is a street in a housing development on the site the media centre at the Sydney Olympics.

== Death ==
Greenspan died of Parkinson's disease on December 25, 2010, at the age of 84 in New York City.

== Select filmography ==
- The Glory of Their Times (1971)
- The Olympiad (22-part series)
  - Jesse Owens Returns to Berlin (1966)
  - The Decathlon (1975)
  - The Incredible Five (1975)
  - The Persistent Ones (1975)
  - The Big Ones that Got Away (1975)
  - The Australians (1975)
  - Women Gold Medal Winners (1975)
  - An Olympic Symphony (1976)
  - The Soviet Athlete (1976)
  - The East Europeans (1976)
  - The 800 Meters (1976)
  - The African Runners (1976)
  - The Marathon (1979)
  - The Magnificent Ones (1979)
  - The Rare Ones (1979)
  - They Didn't Have a Chance (1979)
  - Great Moments at the Winter Games (1979)
  - The 1500 Meters (1980)
  - The Fastest Men in the World (1980)
  - The East Germans (1980)
  - The Immortals (1980)
  - Those Who Endured (1980)
- Wilma or The Story of Wilma Rudolph (1977)
- Sports in America (1979)
- The Heisman Trophy Award Show (1981–1985)
- Time Capsule: The 1932 Los Angeles Olympics (1982)
- 16 Days of Glory/Los Angeles (1984)
- America at the Olympics (1984)
- Time Capsule: The 1936 Berlin Olympics (1986)
- For the Honor of Our Country (1987)
- 16 Days of Glory/Seoul (1988)
- An Olympic Dream (1988)
- The Golden Age of Sport (1988)
- 16 Days of Glory/Calgary (1988)
- 16 Days of Glory/Barcelona (1992)
- Mark Spitz Returns to Munich (1992)
- 16 Days of Glory/Lillehammer (1994)
- Atlanta's Olympic Glory (1996)
- 100 Years of Olympic Glory (1996)
- America's Greatest Olympians (1996)
- Real Athletes/Real History: History of African-Americans at the Olympics (1996)
- Nagano '98 (1998)
- Ageless Heroes (1998)
- Favorite Stories of Olympic Glory (2000)
- Kings of the Ring: Four Legends of Heavyweight Boxing (2000)
- Sydney 2000: Gold from Down Under (2001)
- The 1972 Munich Olympic Games: Bud Greenspan Remembers (2002)
- Bud Greenspan Presents Michelle Kwan (2002)
- Bud Greenspan's Favorite Stories of Winter Olympic Glory (2002)
- Salt Lake 2002: Bud Greenspan's Stories of Olympic Glory (2003)
- Whirlaway! (2005)
- Bud Greenspan's Athens 2004: Stories of Olympic Glory (2005)
- The First Miracle: 1960 U.S. Olympic Men's ice hockey Team (2006)
- Bud Greenspan Presents: Torino 2006 Olympics (2007)
- Beijing 2008 America's Olympic Glory (2009)
- A Time for Champions (2009)
- Bud Greenspan Presents: Vancouver 2010 Stories of Olympic Glory (2011)

== Awards ==
- 2006 Billie Award, Industry Leader
