= Bill MacPhail =

American television executive

William Curtis MacPhail (March 25, 1920 – September 4, 1996) was an American television sports executive.

== Early life and family ==
MacPhail was born in Columbus, Ohio, son of Larry MacPhail, a baseball executive and innovator. He was a graduate of Swarthmore College and served in the United States Navy. His brother was longtime baseball executive Lee MacPhail, and Larry and Lee MacPhail are both members of the National Baseball Hall of Fame. Andy MacPhail, also a baseball executive, is his nephew.

== Early career ==
MacPhail worked his way up in the front office of several minor league teams. He was traveling road secretary for the New York Yankees in 1946 and then worked for eight years for three minor league teams before becoming director of publicity for the Kansas City Athletics in 1955. CBS hired him the following year.

== Broadcasting career ==
MacPhail was a former president of CBS Sports, where he worked from 1956 to 1973. Afterwards he was associated with Bob Wold, a satellite sports pioneer, and then brought to CNN by Reese Schonfeld to create the CNN Sports department in 1980 upon its launch, which he ran until retiring from CNN in 1995. While at CBS Sports, MacPhail is credited with implementing instant replay for the first time in sports — during the Army–Navy Game of 1963.

MacPhail is known for hiring famous broadcasting talent. He introduced a number of sportscasters nationally, including Chris Schenkel, Jim McKay, Dan Patrick, Phil Griffin and Keith Olbermann. He hired former New York Giants kicker Pat Summerall as a sportscaster at CBS. He also hired Frank Gifford, Jack Buck, and golf producer Frank Chirkinian.

MacPhail is recognized for helping CBS Sports acquire the television rights to numerous sporting events, including the 1960 Winter & Summer Olympics in Squaw Valley, United States and Rome, Italy respectively, the NBA, the Masters Tournament (CBS still holds the television rights to this day), and Major League Baseball.

At one point, during the 1960s and '70s, CBS Sports, under MacPhail, owned the rights to all major sports events—pro football, basketball, the Triple Crown, the Masters tournament and other major golf events, except Major League Baseball. MacPhail attempted to acquire the baseball rights, then owned by NBC, from Baseball Commissioner Bowie Kuhn. Kuhn seemed very interested, but the higher up at CBS declined—they did not want to start bidding wars for sports rights. When Roone Arledge was appointed head of ABC Sports, he thought differently and thus the bidding wars began.

While head of CNN Sports, MacPhail acquired news rights from Major League Baseball, the NFL, the NBA and other sporting events so that CNN might carry TV clips of all major sporting events. He also mentored former CNN Worldwide President Jim Walton (journalist). At CNN, MacPhail hired sports anchors Nick Charles, Bob Kurtz, Fred Hickman, Jim Huber, Dan Patrick, Keith Olbermann, Hannah Storm, Dan Hicks, and Daryn Kagan, among others.

== Awards ==
In 1989, MacPhail was the first recipient of Pro Football Hall of Fame’s Pete Rozelle Radio-Television Award. The annual award recognizes "long-time exceptional contributions to radio and television in professional football."
