= List of Pan American Games commentators =

ABC was the first American television network to broadcast the Pan American Games in 1963, when they devoted one episode of their Wide World of Sports anthology program to the games. The doubled their coverage to two episodes of the show in 1967.

== 1960s ==
=== 1963 ===
Network	Hours	Host
ABC	1 1/2	Jim McKay

=== 1967 ===
Network	Hours	Host
ABC	3	Jim McKay

==== Notes ====
- On Saturday, July 29, ABC's Wide World of Sports (5-6:30 p.m. EST) aired highlights of the swimming and track-and-field events at the Pan American Games, live from Winnipeg, Canada.

== 1970s ==
=== 1975 ===
Network	Hours	Host	Play-by-play	Color commentators
CBS	7 2/3	Pat Summerall	Jack Whitaker (Athletics and Boxing); Brent Musburger (Swimming and Baseball); Adrian Metcalfe (Synchronized Swimming)	Bill Toomey (Athletics); Sugar Ray Leonard (Boxing); Keena Rothhammer (Swimming); Kim Ocean-Smith (Synchronized Swimming)

=== 1979 ===
Network	Hours	Host	Play-by-play	Color commentators
CBS	12 1/4	Dick Stockton	Jack Whittaker; Curt Gowdy; Tim Ryan (Boxing); Irv Cross; Gary Bender (Basketball); Jayne Kennedy (Wrestling and Sailing)	Muriel Grossfeld (Gymnastics); Gil Clancy (Boxing); Wilma Rudolph (Athletics); Rick Barry (Basketball)

== 1980s ==
=== 1983 ===
Network	Hours	Host	Play-by-play	Color commentators
CBS	15 1/2	Brent Musburger	Gary Bender (Basketball); Tim Ryan (Boxing); Dick Stockton (Swimming); John Tesh (Gymnastics and Athletics); Pat O'Brien (Other Sports and Breaking Events); John Dockery (Other Sports and Breaking Events)	Billy Packer (Basketball); Gil Clancy (Boxing); John Naber (Swimming); Phil Boggs (Diving); Peter Kormann (Gymnastics); Craig Masback (Athletics)

=== 1987 ===
Network	Hours	Host	Play-by-play	Color commentators
CBS	26	Brent Musburger	Verne Lundquist (Basketball); Tim Ryan (Boxing); Tim Brant (Gymnastics); Dick Stockton (Athletics and Basketball); Jim Nantz (Swimming and Diving); John Dockery (Baseball); Chris Marlowe (Volleyball); Pat O'Brien (Roving Reporter); Anne Butler (Roving Reporter); James Brown (Roving Reporter); Irv Cross (Roving Reporter); Bob Drum (Features); Ron Luciano (Guest Essayist); John Cougar Mellencamp (Guest Essayist); George Plimpton (Guest Essayist); Linda Ellerbee (Guest Essayist)	Billy Packer (Basketball); Gil Clancy (Boxing); Bart Conner (Gymnastics); Kathy Johnson (Gymnastics); John Naber (Swimming); Mark Marquess (Baseball); Craig Masback (Athletics); Mary Decker Slaney (Athletics); Phil Boggs (Diving); Jerry Yeagley (Soccer)

== 1990s ==
=== 1991 ===
Network	Hours	Host	Play-by-play	Color commentators
ABC; TNT	22 (ABC); 26 1/2 (TNT); 2 (TBS) (Total Hours ABC/TNT/TBS combined: 50 1/2)	Brent Musburger; Ernie Johnson Jr. and Nick Charles (opening and closing ceremonies)	Ron Thulin (Basketball); Mark Jones (Boxing); Gary Bender (Gymnastics); John Naber (Swimming); Bob Beattie (Volleyball); Jack Arute (Cycling, Tennis, Soccer, and Features); Craig Sager (Features); Nicole Watson ("sideline reporter", opening and closing ceremonies)	Jim Valvano (Basketball); Cheryl Miller (Basketball); Alex Wallau (Boxing); Bart Conner (Gymnastics); Kathy Johnson (Gymnastics); Donna de Varona (Swimming); Chris Marlowe (Volleyball); Hubie Brown (Basketball)

== See also ==
- List of Wide World of Sports (American TV series) announcers
