= Boxing on CBS =

Overview of boxing broadcasting by the American TV network

CBS has occasionally broadcast boxing events; its first broadcast occurred in 1948. The network's most recent broadcasts of the sport have fallen under Al Haymon's Premier Boxing Champions banner, and its most recent primetime broadcasts have been produced by sister pay television channel Showtime.

== History ==
CBS' earliest experience with boxing dates back to 1948 with the debut of Pabst Blue Ribbon Bouts. The program, featuring blow-by-blow commentator Russ Hodges, lasted through 1955.

CBS had a renewed interest in boxing after losing the National Football Conference package to Fox following the 1993 season. In 1994, they had a new series of fights on Saturday or Sundays under the Eye on Sports banner. Tim Ryan (blow-by-blow) and Gil Clancy (color) were the commentators during this period. CBS continued airing boxing on a somewhat regular basis until 1998, by which time they had the NFL (after acquiring the American Football Conference package from NBC) and college football back on their slate.

On the afternoon of December 15, 2012, as part of a larger marathon of live boxing events being broadcast that day by sister premium network Showtime, CBS broadcast Showtime Boxing on CBS—which featured a main event between Leo Santa Cruz and Alberto Guevara from Los Angeles. The telecast, although delayed due to an overrunning college basketball game, was seen by approximately 1.5 million households. It marked the first live broadcast of a boxing event on CBS since 1997.

In February 2015, CBS Sports reached a deal with Al Haymon's Premier Boxing Champions to air a series of eight, Saturday afternoon cards (branded as PBC on CBS). CBS Sports Network also aired shoulder programming for Floyd Mayweather Jr. vs. Manny Pacquiao. In 2016, CBS Sports Network began to pick up a larger number of events from smaller promoters such as Roy Jones Jr. and Pep Gomez.

On June 25, 2016, as part of PBC, CBS broadcast Showtime-produced coverage of a card featuring a WBC welterweight championship fight between Keith Thurman and Shawn Porter, marking the first boxing event broadcast on CBS in primetime since 1978. The following March, CBS aired Thurman's welterweight unification bout against Danny García.

=== Notable moments ===
On February 22, 1950, CBS broadcast a bout between Lavern Roach and Georgie Small. Roach sustained a fatal head injury during the bout and died the next day due to a subdural hemorrhage. He was the first boxing casualty of 1950 and one of the first boxers ever to suffer a fatal blow live on national television.

Angelo Dundee, Muhammad Ali's trainer, was brought in to be Sugar Ray Leonard's trainer and manager. Long-time coaches Janks Morton, Dave Jacobs and lawyer Mike Trainer made up the rest of Leonard's team. Promoted by ABC-TV as their replacement for the aging Ali, Leonard made $40,000 for his first professional fight (then a record) against Puerto Rican Luis Vega. The fight was televised nationally on CBS-TV, and the novice Leonard won by a 6-round unanimous decision.

For decades, from the 1920s to the 1980s, world championship matches in professional boxing were scheduled for fifteen rounds, but that changed after a November 13, 1982 WBA Lightweight title bout ended with the death of boxer Kim Duk-koo in a fight against Ray Mancini in the 14th round of a nationally televised championship fight on CBS. Exactly three months after the fatal fight, the WBC reduced the number of their championship fights to 12 rounds. It was also the last fight to air as part of strike replacement programming on CBS because of the NFL strike, which ended three days later.

A then 14–0 Oscar De La Hoya appeared on a December 10, 1994 card for CBS.

The last time CBS aired a live boxing event prior to 2012, was on January 20, 1997, when then-middleweight champion Bernard Hopkins knocked out Glen Johnson in the 11th round.

== Commentators ==
- Al Bernstein – In 1980, Bernstein joined ESPN as boxing analyst for the Top Rank Boxing series. He stayed at ESPN until 2003, and during that time he also worked as a reporter for SportsCenter, covering major boxing matches, Major League Baseball, the NBA and the NFL draft. He also wrote and hosted the series Big Fights Boxing Hour for ESPN Classic. In 1988, he won the Sam Taub Award for excellence in boxing broadcasting journalism and in 2012 he was inducted into the International Boxing Hall of Fame. It was announced in December 2012 that he would be inducted into the Nevada Boxing Hall of Fame as one of their inaugural inductees in 2013 in the Media category. In 1992 and 1996, he served as the boxing analyst for NBC's coverage of the Summer Olympic Games. From 1999 to 2002, he was a sports anchor for KVVU news in Las Vegas. Since 2003, Berstein has served as the boxing analyst on Showtime for Showtime Championship Boxing.
- Dave Bontempo
- Tom Brookshier
- Joyce Brothers – Brothers gained fame in late 1955 by winning The $64,000 Question game show, on which she appeared as an expert in the subject area of boxing. Originally, she had not planned to have boxing as her topic, but the sponsors suggested it, and she agreed. A voracious reader, she studied every reference book about boxing that she could find; she would later tell reporters that it was thanks to her good memory that she assimilated so much material and answered even the most difficult questions. In 1959, allegations that the quiz shows were rigged began to surface, but Brothers insisted that she had never cheated, nor had she ever been given any answers in advance. Subsequent investigations verified her assertion that she had won honestly. Her success on The $64,000 Question earned Brothers a chance to be the color commentator for CBS during the boxing match between Carmen Basilio and Sugar Ray Robinson. She was said to be the first woman to ever be a boxing commentator.
- Gil Clancy
- Brian Custer
- Angelo Dundee – Dundee frequently went to other matches during his career to scout other boxers. During the first Joe Frazier vs. George Foreman bout in Kingston, Jamaica, on January 22, 1973, he sat near Howard Cosell, who was recording a call for ABC for a tape delay re-broadcast. He was overheard on the call noting that Frazier had been hurt before he was knocked down by Foreman the first time in the first round; Cosell mentioned it immediately before his famous "Down goes Frazier!" call. Later in the bout, Dundee was overheard pleading for the fight to be stopped as Frazier was repeatedly knocked down. The fight was finally stopped after Frazier was knocked down for the sixth time, with Foreman winning the bout—and the lineal World Heavyweight Championship—by technical knockout.
- Ian Eagle – Eagle joined CBS in 1998 doing announcing work for NFL and NCAA basketball. He continues to serve these roles today. In 2010, he joined Dan Fouts to make up the number three broadcast team for CBS' NFL coverage. The pair was elevated to the number two slot behind Jim Nantz and Phil Simms in the 2014 season. Other CBS work includes boxing, The Pilot Pen Tennis tournament, the U.S. Open (both the late night show and daytime studio host for 2008 U.S. Open coverage), and the NCAA Track and Field Championships.
- Phyllis George
- Jim Gray
- Kevin Harlan – On the network level, Harlan called NFL football for NBC in 1991, college football for ESPN in 1992–93, NFL for Fox from 1994–97, and joined Turner Sports in 1996 to cover NBA playoff games (he would begin calling games throughout the entire season in 1997, which he continues to do to this day). He began working for CBS in 1998.
- Virgil Hunter
- Ted Husing – At CBS, Husing took on a wide variety of events. In 1929, he was named studio director of WABC (the CBS flagship station) in addition to continuing his work as an announcer for the network. He was the original voice of the popular March of Time program and an announcer for shows such as George Burns and Gracie Allen. Above everything, his work on sports gave Husing the greatest prominence. He covered events as diverse as boxing, horse racing, track and field, regattas, seven World Series, tennis, golf, four Olympic Games, Indianapolis 500 motor racing, and especially college football.
- Sugar Ray Leonard – Leonard has worked as a boxing analyst for ABC, CBS, NBC, ESPN, HBO and EPIX. His relationship with HBO lasted for more than a decade. It ended in 1990, after HBO was not offered an opportunity to bid on the telecast rights to Leonard's fight with Terry Norris. HBO believed it would be inappropriate for Leonard to continue with them if they couldn't bid on his fights. Leonard's attorney, Mike Trainer, said, "There never has been a linkage between his broadcasting and his fighting."
- Paulie Malignaggi
- Larry Michael
- Brent Musburger
- Bob Papa
- Jerry Quarry – Quarry retired for over two and a half years after the Norton fight. His career record was at 50–8–4 at this time, with 32 wins by KO. He had two losses each to Frazier and Ali plus one apiece to Norton, Chuvalo, Ellis and Machen to this point. He had been ranked as high as the #1 contender three times. Well-paid and very popular, it was an outstanding boxing career to this point. Arguably, Hall Of Fame caliber. At around this time, Quarry signed a contract with ABC (American Broadcasting Company) to be a boxing commentator. Quarry was very popular in this position, drawing the ire of Howard Cosell, an ABC commentator being pushed out of some work by Quarry. In mid-1977, a return match was being put together which would put Quarry in against a ranked heavyweight. The ranked heavyweight would be Italian Lorenzo Zanon. The match was to be televised on ABC, where Quarry was contracted. But both fighters signed to have the bout televised on CBS (Columbia Broadcasting System). When Quarry, who often negotiated his own fight contracts, signed the bout to CBS, he lost his ABC contract.
- Mauro Ranallo – Ranallo provides commentary for three major combat sports: Showtime Championship Boxing, Glory Kickboxing, and Invicta Fighting Championships MMA.
- Tim Ryan – Notable fights Ryan called include Joe Frazier vs. Muhammad Ali, Floyd Patterson vs. Charlie Green, Floyd Patterson vs. Oscar Bonavena, Monroe Brooks vs. Bruce Curry, Bernard Hopkins vs. Glen Johnson, Sugar Ray Leonard vs. Thomas Hearns, Marvin Hagler vs. Sugar Ray Leonard, and Ray Mancini vs. Kim Duk-koo. His color commentators for boxing were Angelo Dundee, Gil Clancy, and Sugar Ray Leonard. In 1986, Ryan won the Sam Taub Award for Excellence in Broadcasting Journalism.
- Chris Schenkel - In 1956, he moved to CBS Sports, where he continued to call Giants games, along with boxing, Triple Crown horse racing and The Masters golf tournament, among other events. Along with Chuck Thompson, Schenkel called the 1958 NFL Championship Game for NBC. He was the voiceover talent for the first NFL Films production ever made, the 1962 NFL Championship Game between the Green Bay Packers and the New York Giants.
- Brent Stover
- Pat Summerall – Summerall and his NFL on CBS commentating partner Tom Brookshier, called a heavyweight title fight between Muhammad Ali and Jean Pierre Coopman live in prime time on Friday, February 20, 1976. Brent Musburger and Phyllis George of The NFL Today co-hosted the telecast that night. Meanwhile, Don Dunphy supplied some commentary between rounds. A month earlier, CBS assigned Summerall and Brookshier to announce a Ken Norton bout against Pedro Lovell, a mere eight days before they called Super Bowl X.
- Jack Whitaker – He entered network sports in 1961 at CBS, where he hosted the anthology series CBS Sports Spectacular among other duties. He worked for CBS for more than two decades. Whitaker is probably best remembered for his coverage of golf and horse racing. He covered thoroughbred racing's Triple Crown Events, golf's four major championships, the very first Super Bowl, championship boxing, the National Professional Soccer League in 1967, the North American Soccer League a year later, and Major League Baseball. He was a studio host for The NFL Today at CBS, the network's pre-game show.
