= Sports Tonight (American TV program) =

American television series

Sports Tonight is an American sports news television program that aired on CNN from 1980 to 2001, and on CNN/SI from December 12, 1996 to the channel's demise on May 15, 2002. It normally aired at 11 p.m. ET/10 p.m. CT.

== History ==
=== The early years ===
When CNN went on the air on June 1, 1980 one of the first newscasts was a sports bulletin where baseball and North American Soccer League highlights were shown. Later, a nightly program called Sports Tonight went on the air in late night. During this time, Nick Charles and Fred Hickman became established as the program's co-hosts. In addition, CNN aired a weekend program called Sports Saturday and Sports Sunday.

One of the program's most popular features was called "Play of the Day" (later known as the "Replay of the Day"), which showed a highlight (i.e., a spectacular play) from that day's action.

=== The 1990s and the end ===
In 1996, CNN launched a new station called CNN/SI. Sports Tonight was renamed CNN/Sports Illustrated, and was replayed many times throughout the night on CNN/SI, like ESPN was doing (and continues to do) with SportsCenter.

The program reclaimed its Sports Tonight name shortly afterwards, and when CNN pre-empted the show in late 2000 due to the coverage of the disputed 2000 presidential election, producers decided to differentiate the format from SportsCenter's highlights. Sports Tonight was relaunched in 2001 with a sports talk format, where viewers interacted with the hosts via the Internet and toll-free phone lines about their favorite teams and players. By then, Charles was no longer hosting; Hickman and Vince Cellini were the program's hosts.

Sports Tonight continued on both CNN and CNN/SI until September 2001. When the terrorist attacks occurred on September 11, 2001, CNN went to all-news programming. Three days later, CNN announced that the program would no longer air on CNN, but remain on CNN/SI. In May 2002, CNN/SI shut down operations, and Sports Tonight ended after a 21-year run.

=== Aftermath ===
Since the cancellation of Sports Tonight, CNN has aired various programming at 11 p.m. ET, including Connie Chung Tonight, Lou Dobbs Tonight, Anderson Cooper 360, Erin Burnett OutFront, Don Lemon Tonight, CNN Tonight and currently Laura Coates Live .

CNN International airs a similar show, World Sport, that airs several times a day as of 2026.

In 2024, as part of its launch of a nightly sports block programmed by TNT Sports, sibling network TruTV began airing a 6 p.m. ET news show titled TNT Sports Tonight (originally announced as TNT Sports Update), which is produced by CNN and hosted by Coy Wire. K As of March 2025, it is no longer on truTV's schedule.

== List of Sports Tonight hosts ==
- Andre Aldrige
- Steve Bartelstein
- Steve Berthiaume
- Vince Cellini
- Nick Charles
- Paul Crane
- Justin Farmer
- Bob Fiscella
- John Fricke
- Mike Galanos
- Eric Goodman
- Inga Hammond
- Kara Henderson
- Fred Hickman
- Dan Hicks
- Jim Huber
- Daryn Kagan
- Tom Kirkland
- Barry LeBrock
- Bob Lorenz
- Mark McKay
- Gary Miller
- Nancy Newman
- Keith Olbermann
- Dan Patrick
- Chris Rose
- Craig Sager
- Larry Smith
- Hannah Storm
- Van Earl Wright
