= FanDuel Sports Network Southeast =

American regional sports network

- Type: Regional sports network
- Country: United States
- Broadcast area: Georgia; Tennessee; Alabama; Mississippi; South Carolina parts of North Carolina including Asheville, Charlotte, and Winston-Salem; Nationwide (via satellite)
- Network: FanDuel Sports Network
- Headquarters: Atlanta, Georgia

Programming
- Language: English
- Picture format: 720p (HDTV); 480i (SDTV)

Ownership
- Owner: Main Street Sports Group
- Sister channels: FanDuel Sports Network South

History
- Launched: October 13, 2006; 19 years ago
- Replaced: Turner South
- Closed: September 30, 2026 (5 days ago)
- Former names: SportSouth (2006–15); Fox Sports Southeast (2015–21); Bally Sports Southeast (2021–24)

Links
- Website: www.fanduelsportsnetwork.com

Availability (Some events may air on an overflow feed due to event conflicts)

Streaming media
- FanDuel Sports Network app: www.fanduelsportsnetwork.com/mvpd/login (U.S. cable internet subscribers only; requires login from participating providers to stream content; some events may not be available due to league rights restrictions)
- DirecTV Stream: Internet Protocol television
- FuboTV: Internet Protocol television

FanDuel Sports Network Southeast was an American regional sports network owned by Main Street Sports Group (formerly Diamond Sports Group) and operated as an affiliate of FanDuel Sports Network. Headquartered in Atlanta, Georgia, the channel broadcasts regional coverage of sports events throughout the southeastern United States, with a focus on professional sports teams based in Atlanta, Tennessee, and Charlotte.

FanDuel Sports Network Southeast was available on cable providers throughout Georgia, Tennessee, Alabama, Mississippi, South Carolina and parts of North Carolina (roughly from Asheville to Charlotte); it was also available nationwide on satellite via DirecTV. The channel's programming reaches an estimated 8.9 million cable and satellite subscribers.

== History ==
The channel traces its history to Turner South, a cable and satellite television channel that was launched on October 1, 1999, by the Turner Broadcasting System. It was the first regional entertainment network developed especially for viewers in the southern U.S., featuring a mix of movies, comedy and drama series, regional news updates, and unique original programming. The channel also aired professional sports events featuring Atlanta Braves of Major League Baseball, the National Basketball Association's Atlanta Hawks, and the National Hockey League's Atlanta Thrashers, all of which were owned by Turner at the network's launch and the former two of which also aired in the Atlanta market and nationwide on Turner-owned TBS.

Turner Broadcasting/Time Warner restricted Turner South's distribution to its designated broadcast territory in the southeastern United States, with satellite providers that carried the channel being required to black out the channel in areas not covered by the ZIP codes in Turner South's coverage area.

News Corporation filed a lawsuit against Turner Broadcasting and its corporate parent Time Warner in a Georgia Superior Court on June 15, 1999, citing that the plans Turner had unveiled to carry sports events on Turner South violated a non-compete agreement that the two companies signed as part of News Corporation's $65 million purchase of the original SportSouth in 1996, which prohibited Turner from launching a regional sports network in the southeastern United States until 2008.

=== Sale to Fox Sports Networks ===
On February 23, 2006, Fox Sports Net's then-parent company News Corporation, looking to further expand its roster of sports teams and events, purchased Turner South for $375 million. The deal included all existing sports contracts, involving teams that sister network-to-be FSN South (now FanDuel Sports Network South) also held the regional cable television rights to broadcast.

After the deal was completed, FSN sought a new name for the channel, with network officials eventually chose to rebrand it as SportSouth, after coming up with about 60 different suggestions. The SportSouth name was originally used as the name for what is now FanDuel Sports Network South, which was founded by Turner Broadcasting in 1990 and was purchased by News Corporation's Fox Cable Networks unit in 1996, becoming a charter outlet of Fox Sports Net. Under Turner ownership, the original SportSouth carried Braves and Hawks games, as well as NBA games from the Charlotte Hornets, World Championship Wrestling events, college sports and some syndicated programs.

Turner South officially relaunched as SportSouth on October 13, 2006, becoming the 15th regional sports network owned as part of Fox Sports Net; the rebrand took place with its first official event broadcast: an NHL game between the Atlanta Thrashers and the Carolina Hurricanes. The relaunched channel dropped all non-sports entertainment programming, replacing it with other regionally produced programs and national sports news, documentary and magazine programming sourced by FSN. On-air promotions for SportSouth included sports figures native to the South such as Steve Spurrier, Bob Hartley, Bo Jackson and Heath Shuler.

Originally, the two networks only shared broadcast rights to Atlanta-based teams, while FSN South exclusively broadcast games from the NBA's Memphis Grizzlies, Major League Baseball's Baltimore Orioles and the NHL's Carolina Hurricanes and Nashville Predators. However, FSN South and SportSouth gradually began sharing rights to sports events from other teams during the late 2000s. In 2008, select Major League Baseball games from the Cincinnati Reds and St. Louis Cardinals were added to SportSouth's schedule (via sister network FSN Midwest), subject to league territorial restrictions. This ensures that both those teams and the Predators have the maximum number of games able to be televised.

Final logo as SportSouth, used from 2012 to 2015

In August 2007, News Corporation lifted SportSouth's regional blackout restrictions, allowing the channel to be carried nationwide by DirecTV on its "Sports Pack"; however, some professional sporting events are still subject to blackout restrictions imposed by the major sports leagues for national telecasts. On August 28 of that year, SportSouth acquired the television rights to Tennessee Volunteers sporting events, in a package that includes encore presentations of twelve football games, live telecasts of four men's basketball games, four women's basketball games and six Olympic sporting events, as well as rights to the team's coaches shows for the former three sports.

The Atlanta Braves' relationship with SportSouth and independent station WPCH-TV (channel 17) – which until October 2007, served as the local broadcast version of TBS – intersected in 2011, when sister network Fox Sports South began producing an annual package of Braves games for the station that were not broadcast by the two networks. On March 1, 2013, Fox Sports South and SportSouth announced that they would acquire the rights to the 45 games, ending the team's contract with WPCH-TV beginning with the 2013 season, marking the first season in 40 years that the team's game telecasts did not air in the Atlanta market on broadcast television until 2025, when WPCH-TV returned to airing selected games as simulcasts from the cable channel.

=== Rebranding to Fox Sports Southeast ===
Fox Sports Southeast logo

On August 24, 2015, Fox announced that SportSouth would be rebranded as Fox Sports Southeast. The name change took effect six weeks later on its target date of October 5.

Fox Sports Networks senior vice president and general manager Jeff Genthner felt that the re-branding of FSN South as Fox Sports South may have caused viewer confusion due to the similar names. Consumer research conducted in the Charlotte, Memphis and Atlanta markets found that viewers were confused about the autonomy of Fox Sports South and SportSouth, the latter network's relation to the Fox Sports regional networks, and perceived that Fox Sports South had better programming. Network management reportedly had been considering a name change for the channel since 2012, including the use of a numerical brand for SportSouth (similar to that used by national sister networks Fox Sports 1 and Fox Sports 2), and color-code branding (with the main network as "Fox Sports South Red" and the secondary network as "Fox Sports South Blue").

=== New ownership, rebranding to Bally Sports ===
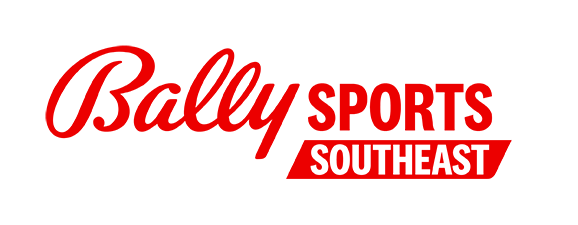
Former logo as Bally Sports Southeast, used from 2021 to 2024.

On August 22, 2019, the Fox Sports Networks were sold to Sinclair Broadcast Group and Entertainment Studios via the joint venture Diamond Sports Group. Fox divested its regional sports networks under antitrust grounds as part of the acquisition of 21st Century Fox by The Walt Disney Company.

On March 31, 2021, the channel, along with all other FSN channels, was rebranded under the new Bally Sports brand.

On March 14, 2023, Diamond Sports filed for Chapter 11 Bankruptcy.

On October 16, 2024, it was revealed in a court filing that Diamond had reached a new sponsorship agreement with FanDuel Group, under which it intended to rebrand Bally Sports as the FanDuel Sports Network; on October 18, 2024, Diamond officially announced the rebranding, which took effect October 21. Under the agreement, Bally's regional networks were rebranded with corresponding names such as FanDuel Sports Network South, etc. In November 2024, Diamond Sports Group announced a multi-year agreement with Prime Video to distribute its regional sports networks as an add-on subscription service. Diamond Sports Group emerged from Chapter 11 bankruptcy on January 2, 2025, rebranding as Main Street Sports Group, which continues to operate FanDuel Sports Network Southeast.

== Streaming and distribution ==
According to the Associated Press, FanDuel Sports Network regional channels became available through Prime Video as an add-on subscription priced at $19.99 per month, with select NBA and NHL games also offered for single-game purchase through the network’s direct-to-consumer service. In February 2025, Sports Video Group reported that FanDuel Sports Network introduced direct-to-consumer subscription options for Atlanta Braves broadcasts, including monthly and season-pass pricing for in-market viewers. The Atlanta Hawks list FanDuel Sports Network Southeast as their regional broadcaster, noting carriage on cable, satellite, and streaming providers, as well as availability through Prime Video in the network’s market. In January 2026, the Associated Press reported that nine Major League Baseball teams, including the Atlanta Braves, terminated their local television agreements with FanDuel Sports Network, with Major League Baseball prepared to produce and distribute broadcasts if required. On February 24, 2026, the Atlanta Braves announced the launch of called BravesVision, which games will be produced and distributed in-house by the Braves themselves, ending their tenure with FanDuel Sports Network. In addition, a limited selection of Braves games will also be broadcast on local Gray Media television stations for free in the Southeast area through a continued partnership with Gray Media. The MLB's new launched Braves.tv will also stream telecasts produced by BravesVision.

== Programming ==
FanDuel Sports Network Southeast and FanDuel Sports Network South hold the exclusive regional cable television rights to the Atlanta Hawks, Charlotte Hornets and Memphis Grizzlies of the NBA and the Carolina Hurricanes and Nashville Predators of the NHL.

=== Teams by Media Market ===
		MLB			NBA					NHL		WNBA
		Atlanta Braves (before 2026)	Cincinnati Reds (FanDuel Sports Network Ohio [before 2026])	St. Louis Cardinals (FanDuel Sports Network Midwest [before 2026])	Atlanta Hawks	Charlotte Hornets	Memphis Grizzles	Indiana Pacers (FanDuel Sports Network Indiana)	New Orleans Pelicans (Bally Sports New Orleans [before 2024])	Carolina Hurricanes	Nashville Predators	Atlanta Dream
	Network(see note)	South/Southeast	South/Southeast	South/Southeast	Southeast	Southeast	Southeast	South	South	South	South	South/Southeast
Georgia	(all markets including Atlanta)	Yes	No	No	Yes	No	No	No	No	Yes	Yes	Yes
Alabama	(excluding Huntsville and Mobile)	Yes	No	No	Yes	No	Yes	No	No	No	Yes	Yes
Alabama	Huntsville	Yes	No	No	No	No	Yes	No	No	No	Yes	Yes
Alabama	Mobile	Yes	No	No	Yes	No	Yes	No	Yes	No	Yes	Yes
Kentucky	(excluding Western Kentucky)	No	Available on FanDuel Sports Network Ohio	No	No	No	Yes	Yes	No	No	Yes	No
Kentucky	Western Kentucky	No	No	Yes	No	No	Yes	Yes	No	No	Yes	No
Mississippi	(excluding Biloxi/Gulfport, Memphis and New Orleans)	Yes	No	No	Yes	No	Yes	No	Yes	No	Yes	Yes
Mississippi	Biloxi/Gulfport	Yes	No	No	No	No	Yes	No	Yes	No	Yes	Yes
Mississippi	Northern Mississippi (Memphis)	Yes	No	Yes	No	No	Yes	No	No	No	Yes	Yes
North Carolina	Charlotte, Asheville (excluding Graham, Jackson, Macon and Swain counties)	Yes	Yes	No	No	Yes	No	No	No	Yes	No	Yes
North Carolina	Graham, Jackson, Macon and Swain counties	Yes	Yes	No	Yes	Yes	No	No	No	Yes	No	Yes
North Carolina	Greensboro-High Point	Yes	Yes	No	No	Yes	No	No	No	Yes	No	Yes
North Carolina	Greenville	No	No	No	No	Yes	No	No	No	Yes	No	No
North Carolina	Raleigh-Durham	No	No	No	No	Yes	No	No	No	Yes	No	Yes
South Carolina	Charleston, Augusta, Savannah, Greenville/Spartanburg (Abbeville, Anderson, and Oconee counties only)	Yes	No	No	Yes	Yes	No	No	No	Yes	No	Yes
South Carolina	Columbia, Greenville/Spartanburg (excluding Abbeville, Anderson, and Oconee counties), Myrtle Beach	Yes	No	No	No	Yes	No	No	No	Yes	No	Yes
Tennessee	Nashville, Chattanooga, Knoxville	Yes	Yes	No	Yes	No	Yes	No	No	No	Yes	Yes
Tennessee	Memphis, Jackson	Yes	Yes	Yes	No	No	Yes	No	No	No	Yes	Yes

Note: In Kentucky, most of North Carolina, and parts of Mississippi, FanDuel Sports Network Southeast is not available. In these areas all games are shown on FanDuel Sports Network South or an alternate channel.

== On-air staff ==
=== Atlanta Hawks ===
- Bob Rathbun – play-by-play announcer
- Dominique Wilkins – analyst
- Matt Winer - Hawks LIVE host / reporter
- Madison Hock - reporter
- Brian Oliver - Hawks LIVE analyst / fill-in game analyst

==== Charlotte Hornets ====
- Eric Collins – play-by-play announcer
- Dell Curry – analyst
- Shannon Spake – in-game reporter / Hornets LIVE pre-game and post-game host
- Terrence Oglesby – Hornets LIVE analyst (Home Games Only)

==== Memphis Grizzlies ====
- Pete Pranica – play-by-play announcer
- Brevin Knight – analyst
- Rob Fischer – sideline reporter and Grizzlies LIVE pre-game and post-game host
- Chris Vernon - Grizzlies Live pre-game and post-game analyst (home games only)

== Former announcers ==
- Kevin Egan – Atlanta United play-by-play announcer
- Maurice Edu – Atlanta United analyst
- Jillian Sakovits – sideline reporter / Atlanta United LIVE host
- Kelly Crull - reporter / Braves LIVE fill-in pre-game and post-game host
- Rebecca Kaple – sideline reporter
- Ashley ShahAhmadi – sideline reporter / Hornets LIVE host
- Chip Caray – Atlanta Braves play-by-play announcer
- Andre Aldridge – sideline reporter / Hawks LIVE host
- Mike Glenn – Hawks LIVE analyst
- Gerald Henderson Hornets LIVE analyst
- Jerome Jurenovich – Braves LIVE and Hawks LIVE pre-game and post-game host
- Brian Jordan – Braves LIVE analyst
- Treavor Scales – Hawks LIVE host
- Tabitha Turner – Atlanta Hawks sideline reporter
- Vince Carter - Atlanta Hawks analyst (select games) and Hawks LIVE fill-in pre-game and post-game host

=== Atlanta Braves ===
- Brandon Gaudin – play-by-play announcer
- C. J. Nitkowski – analyst
- Jeff Francoeur – analyst
- Wiley Ballard – reporter / alternate play-by-play announcer / Braves Live fill-in pre-game and post-game host
- Paul Byrd – analyst / reporter
- Treavor Scales – Braves LIVE pre-game and post-game host
- Nick Green – Braves Live analyst / Braves Live fill-in pre-game and post-game host
- Peter Moylan – Braves Live analyst
- Hanna Yates – reporter
