= CNN/SI =

Former 24-hour sports news network

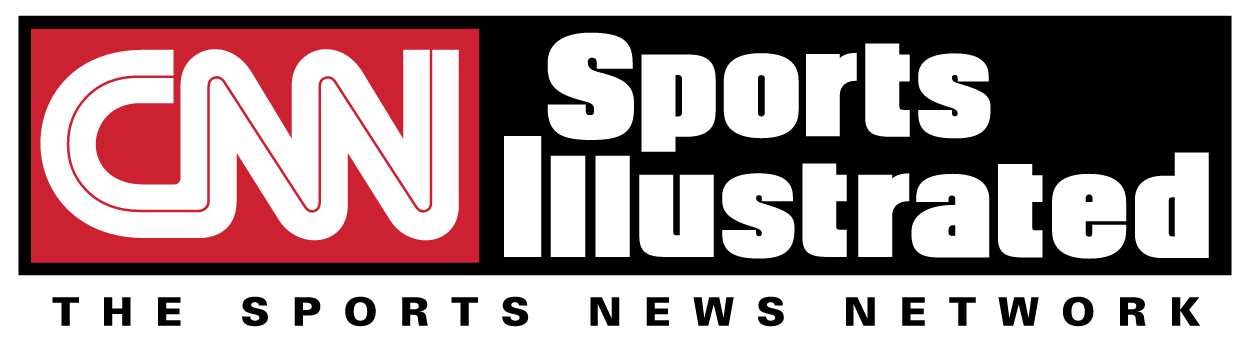
- Country: United States
- Broadcast area: Nationwide

Programming
- Language: English
- Picture format: 480i (SDTV)

Ownership
- Owner: Turner Broadcasting System
- Sister channels: CNN; CNN Headline News; TNT; TBS Superstation; Turner South; Turner Classic Movies; Cartoon Network; Boomerang; CNNfn

History
- Launched: December 12, 1996; 29 years ago
- Closed: May 15, 2002; 24 years ago
- Replaced by: NBA TV (on many cable systems)

CNN/Sports Illustrated (CNN/SI) was a 24-hour sports news network. Created when Time Warner merged its CNN and Sports Illustrated brands, it launched on December 12, 1996.

CNN/SI's first logo

Other news networks like ESPNews provided 30-minute blocks of news and highlights in a similar fashion to CNN Headline News at the time, but CNN/SI was live daily from 7am to 2am. Its purpose was to provide the most comprehensive sports news service on television, bringing in-depth sports news from around the world, and integrating the internet and television.

== Closure ==
CNN/SI's closure had been attributed to competition with other all-sports news networks and sports newscasts which started around the same time, such as ESPNews and Fox Sports Net's National Sports Report. Though CNN/SI aired exclusive content, such as the tape of former Indiana University coach Bob Knight choking player Neil Reed, the channel reached only 20 million homes, not adequate enough to receive a rating by Nielsen Media Research, which reduced sponsorship. ESPNews, in contrast, benefited from being bundled with ESPN (86.5 million homes). The news channel parent CNN did not have the same influence with cable operators for its all-sports news channel. CNN's cancellation of their flagship sports program, Sports Tonight (which had already been retooled to compete with SportsCenter) after the September 11 attacks contributed to the closure of CNN/SI, as it lost all connections to their mother network.

Near its closure, Sports Tonight was exclusive to CNN/SI. CNN/SI added NASCAR qualifying, Wimbledon matches, National Lacrosse League matches, and televised the now-defunct Women's United Soccer Association

CNN/SI shut down on May 15, 2002. On many cable systems, CNN/SI was replaced by NBA TV. NBA TV, which launched in 1999, eventually evolved into a joint venture between Time Warner and the NBA that officially launched on October 28, 2008.

Following the network's closure, its international sports program World Sport continues to air, and since 2002 has been produced by CNN International.

CNN itself would not produce another regular sportscast until 2024, when a new CNN-produced newscast, TNT Sports Tonight, debuted on TruTV as part of a plan to increase sports programming on that network.

== Website ==
CNN Sports Illustrated site logo (2002)

The CNN/SI name was maintained for Sports Illustrated's online presence at cnnsi.com. In January 2013, CNN acquired Bleacher Report and after Time Warner's spin-off of their publishing assets into Time Inc. (and subsequently sale to Meredith Corporation and later, to IAC's Dotdash), they dropped all use of the Sports Illustrated name.

== Programming ==
- Sports Tonight (1996–2001) hosted by various anchors
- NFL Preview hosted by Bob Lorenz with analysts Trev Alberts, Irving Fryar and Peter King
- College Football Preview hosted by Bob Lorenz with analyst Trev Alberts and Ivan Maisel
- This Week in the NBA hosted by Andre Aldridge and Kevin Loughery
- Sports Illustrated Golf Plus hosted by Bob Fiscella and Phil Jones
- World Sport hosted by various anchors
- Page One hosted by Laura Okmin
- NASCAR Plus hosted by Johnny Phelps
- Sports Illustrated - Cover to Cover
- Trev Alberts' Full Tilt
- The Sporting Life with Jim Huber
