= Cover date =

Date shown on a periodical

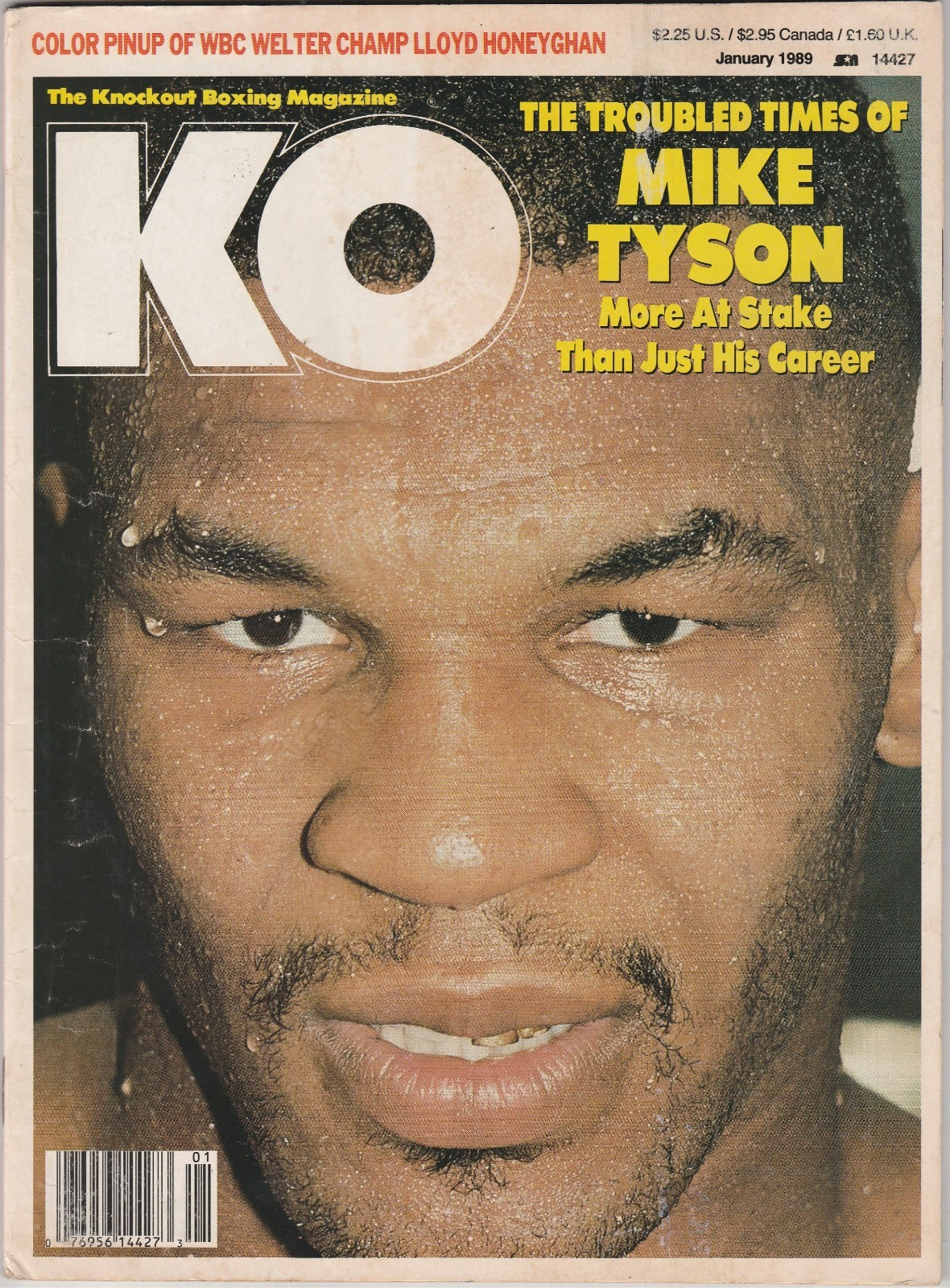
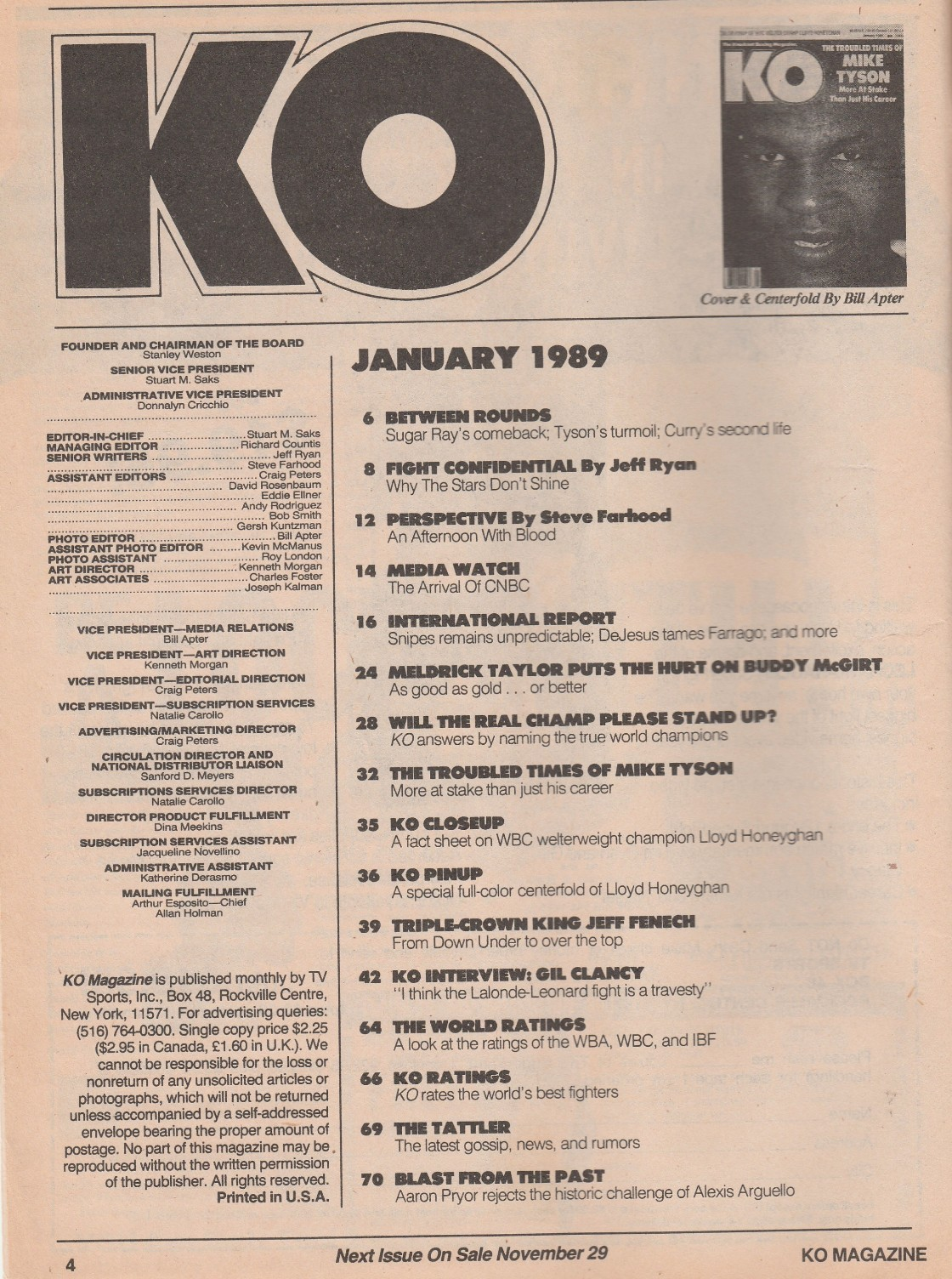
An issue of KO Magazine cover dated January 1989, and its table of contents stating the next issue will be published on November 29, 1988

The cover date of a periodical publication is the date displayed on the cover, which is not necessarily the true date of publication (the on-sale date or release date); later cover dates are common in magazine and comic book publishing. More unusually, Le Monde is a daily newspaper published the afternoon before its cover date. For some publications, the cover date may not be found on the cover, but rather on an inside jacket or on an interior page.

== Magazines ==
In the United States, Canada, and the United Kingdom, the standard practice is to display on magazine covers a date which is some weeks or months in the future from the publishing or release date. There are two reasons for this discrepancy: first, to allow magazines to continue appearing "current" to consumers even after they have been on sale for some time (since not all magazines will be sold immediately), and second, to inform newsstands when an unsold magazine can be removed from the stands and returned to the publishing company or be destroyed (in this case, the cover date is also the pull date).

Weeklies (such as Time and Newsweek) are generally dated a week ahead. Monthlies (such as National Geographic) are generally dated two to three months ahead, and quarterlies are generally dated half a month ahead.

In other countries, the cover date usually matches more closely the date of publication, and may indeed be identical where weekly magazines are concerned.

In all markets, it is rare for monthly magazines to indicate a particular day of the month: thus issues are dated May 2016, and so on, whereas weekly magazines may be dated 17 May 2016.

== Comic books ==
The general practice of most mainstream comic book companies since the creation of the comic book in the 1930s was to date individual issues by putting the name of a month (and much later the year as well) on the cover which was generally two months after the release date. For example, a 1951 issue of Superman which had the cover date of July would have been published two months earlier from that date in the month of May, generally speaking. In 1973 the discrepancy between the cover date and the publishing date went from two months to three months. In 1989 the cover date and publishing date discrepancy was changed back to two months, though generally each comic book company now uses its own system.

The two major American comic book publishers, DC Comics and Marvel Comics, have both discontinued the use of cover dates. Marvel Comics opted against putting cover dates on the cover in October 1999; instead, the "cover" date was moved to the indicia on an interior page. DC Comics discontinued the practice in 2018, also moving the date to the indicia.
