= Dick Stockton =

American sportscaster

- Born: Richard Edward Stokvis; November 22, 1942 (age 83); Philadelphia, Pennsylvania, U.S.
- Education: Syracuse University
- Occupations: Television and radio sportscaster
- Years active: 1965–2021
- Sports commentary career
- Genre: Play-by-play
- Sports: American football; baseball; basketball

Richard Edward Stokvis (born November 22, 1942), known professionally as Dick Stockton, is an American retired sportscaster. Stockton began his career in Philadelphia, then moved to Pittsburgh, where he worked as the sports director for KDKA-TV. In Boston, he called Celtics games for WBZ-TV and Red Sox games for WSBK-TV before transitioning to national broadcasting, which included calling the 1975 World Series for NBC and later, the NBA Finals for CBS. In a career that spanned over five decades, Stockton worked for several different networks, most prominently CBS Sports, Fox Sports, and Turner Sports.

== Biography ==
=== Early life and career ===
Stockton was born in Philadelphia, Pennsylvania to Joseph and Beatrice Stokvis. He has one older sister, Irene. He attended Forest Hills High School in Queens, New York, graduating in 1960. He went on to college at Syracuse University, where he received his degree in political science in 1964. At Syracuse, he was sports director at WAER. He was inducted into the WAER Hall of Fame on October 12, 2016. In 1965, he began his sportscasting career at local radio and television stations in Philadelphia. He became sports director at KDKA-TV in Pittsburgh in 1967, and moved to WBZ-TV and WBZ radio in Boston in 1971. Three years later, he began calling Boston Celtics telecasts for WBZ, and the following year he became the lead announcer for Boston Red Sox games on WSBK-TV. Stockton was part of the broadcast crew for NBC Sports' coverage of the 1975 World Series, and on television called Carlton Fisk's famous, game-winning home run in Game 6 of that series as follows:

There it goes! A long drive. . . . if it stays fair. . . . home run!

Stockton stayed silent as Fisk rounded the bases, waiting until he made his way into the Red Sox dugout before proclaiming: "We will have a seventh game in this 1975 World Series."

=== Broadcasting career ===
==== CBS Sports ====
Stockton started freelancing for CBS Sports in the late 1960s, while still doing local television at KDKA-TV in Pittsburgh. In 1978 (following a two-year stint calling NFL games for NBC), he joined CBS full-time, and from then until 1994 covered a variety of sports for that network, including the NFL, the NBA (for which Stockton was the lead play-by-play man from 1981 to 1990), Major League Baseball and NCAA Basketball, including ten years as a play-by-play broadcaster of the NCAA Regional finals. Stockton also was the host at the famous upset of Villanova over Georgetown in 1985.

On January 23, 1972, he filled-in for Jim Gordon who was not in Boston for the Buffalo-Boston NHL game on CBS, working the game with Dan Kelly. As previously mentioned, although Stockton was doing some work for The NFL on CBS, was also at the time a sports anchor for WBZ-TV in Boston.

Also while at CBS Sports, he called nine NBA Finals, including the 1984, 1985 and 1987 finals between the Los Angeles Lakers and Boston Celtics. Stockton partnered with Bill Russell to call the finals from 1982 to 1983, Tom Heinsohn for the finals from 1984 to 1987, Billy Cunningham for the 1988 finals, and Hubie Brown for the 1989 and 1990 finals.

On May 7, 1989, Stockton and Hubie Brown, were behind the microphone for the fifth and decisive game for the NBA's Eastern Conference First round playoff series between the Chicago Bulls and Cleveland Cavaliers. The game was highlighted by a buzzer-beater shot by Michael Jordan to give the Bulls a 101–100 win and clinch a series victory.

Sellers has Jordan. Jordan with 2 seconds to go, puts it up and scores! At the buzzer! Michael Jordan has won it for Chicago! Michael Jordan hit the basket at the buzzer as a disconsolate Lenny Wilkens leaves the floor. And for the second time today, the visiting team has won a deciding game in an opening round series. And the Chicago Bulls will move on to play the New York Knicks in a best-of-7.

— Dick Stockton on the call on CBS.

CBS would lose their broadcasting rights to the NBA to NBC following the 1989–90 season. At the end of CBS' coverage of Game 5 of the 1990 NBA Finals, Stockton signed off with the following message:

Well, I guess now the time has come. This is our last game as many of you may know. And it's really the end of a 17-year love affair between CBS and the NBA. For every member of our broadcast team and I mean technicians, and cameramen, production people, the terrifically talented folks in the truck, where it all happens, and of course...the commentators, this has been an extraordinary experience. We've witnessed the careers of Julius Erving and Larry Bird and Magic Johnson. We've seen Michael Jordan take flight. All the players actually...fired the imagination not only for an entire generation of NBA fans but for all of us at CBS. We know we leave the NBA in good hands. But to Isiah and Akeem and Patrick and David Robinson, to all the players, coaches...and you the viewers, we're going to miss all of you. So long!

In 2001, Stockton received the Curt Gowdy Electronic Media Award from the Naismith Basketball Hall of Fame.

As previously mentioned, Stockton called Major League Baseball for CBS from 1990 to 1992. Working alongside Jim Kaat, Stockton was the number #2 play-by-play man behind Jack Buck and subsequently Sean McDonough. He and Kaat also called the American League Championship Series during that time period. It was initially speculated that Stockton would not have been available to contribute as the secondary play-by-play announcer due to his football and basketball commitments for CBS. Stockton would, however, be replaced by Greg Gumbel in 1993.

For the Game 5 of the 1991 ALCS between the Minnesota Twins and Toronto Blue Jays, Stockton called the final out by saying "And the Minnesota Twins have gone from the cellar to the penthouse in the American League." The following year in Game 4 of the ALCS between Toronto and the Oakland Athletics, Stockton described Roberto Alomar's game-tying home run off of Oakland closer Dennis Eckersley by saying “A drive to right field, Sierra going back, looking up and this game is tied! Roberto Alomar!”

In addition, he was the host of the Pan American Games in San Juan in 1979, and covered swimming and diving at the Pan American Games in Edmonton and Caracas. Stockton also broadcast the World Swimming and Diving Championships in Guayaquil, Ecuador, the World Basketball Championships in Cali, Colombia, and the World Figure Skating Championships in Helsinki in the first year that CBS acquired the rights. When CBS began covering the Winter Olympics, Stockton was assigned to cover skiing in France in 1992 and two years later, he called the speed skating events in the 1994 Norway Games including Dan Jansen's record-breaking triumph of the 1000 meter gold medal as well as the gold medal victories of Bonnie Blair.

==== Fox Sports ====
Stockton left CBS in 1994 for the newly formed Fox Sports, who continued to employ him on NFL broadcasts up until Stockton announced his retirement in March 2021.

Stockton called Major League Baseball telecasts for the Fox broadcast network/FX in some shape or form from 1997 through 2013.

From the time he was hired until 2006, he was Fox's second-team announcer for NFL games (behind Pat Summerall and later, Joe Buck), working alongside Matt Millen and then Troy Aikman, Daryl Johnston, and Tony Siragusa. For Fox's MLB coverage, he has partnered with Eric Karros, Joe Girardi, Mark Grace and Tim McCarver and others. He most recently worked with Mark Schlereth for football.

Additionally, he called a limited slate of college basketball games on FS1 for 3 seasons from 2013 to 2016.

==== Turner Sports ====
From 1995 to 2015, Stockton called NBA telecasts for Turner's TNT channel. From 2007 to 2013, Stockton called postseason Major League Baseball games on TBS. In 2007, he partnered with Ron Darling to call the National League Division Series between the Arizona Diamondbacks and Chicago Cubs for the network. In 2008, he called the AL Central tiebreaker game between the Minnesota Twins and Chicago White Sox with Darling and Harold Reynolds, followed by the NLDS between the Chicago Cubs and Los Angeles Dodgers with Darling and Tony Gwynn. In 2009, he teamed with Bob Brenly to call the NLDS between the Los Angeles Dodgers and St. Louis Cardinals for TBS, and the two worked the NLDS every year until 2014. Stockton split play-by-play duties during the 2010 regular season on TBS with NBA on TNT studio host Ernie Johnson Jr. and Milwaukee Brewers announcer Brian Anderson. In 2011, he partnered with Ron Darling and John Smoltz to call Game 5 of the National League Division Series between the Philadelphia Phillies and St. Louis Cardinals when his regular partner Brenly was away.

Dick Stockton's performance on TBS' baseball telecasts hasn't been without criticism. For instance, during the 2013 NLDS (St. Louis vs. Pittsburgh), he was cited as often misidentifying players, generally appearing confused at times, and never having hosting chemistry with his analyst Bob Brenly.

==== Other ====
From 1993 to 1995, Stockton also called local TV broadcasts of the Oakland Athletics. In 2004, he began doing part-time local television work for the San Antonio Spurs, this role lasted three seasons until 2007. Stockton called Super Bowl XXXVIII alongside Daryl Johnston and Super Bowl XLII alongside Sterling Sharpe on the international feed, provided by the NFL Network. This is the feed used by the BBC and certain other English-language broadcasters outside North America. Starting in 2010, Dick assumed play-by-play duties for Miami Dolphins preseason games on WFOR; he substituted for Jimmy Cefalo as play-by-play on the Dolphins' radio call of the team's Monday Night Football game against the New England Patriots on October 4, 2010.

Stockton did the play-by-play commentary for NFL Fever 2000 alongside Matt Millen.

In 2017, Stockton launched his own podcast entitled Stockton!, where he interviewed famous athletes.

On March 25, 2021, Stockton announced his retirement from broadcasting.

== Personal life ==
Stockton is wed to Jamie Drinkwater. The couple were married on July 31, 2014, at her family's home in New York on the St. Lawrence River. They divide their time between homes in Boca Raton, Florida and Carefree, Arizona. Stockton's previous marriage to sportscaster Lesley Visser ended in divorce in 2010.

== Career timeline ==
Year	Title	Role	Network
1974–1975	Boston Celtics	Play-by-play	WBZ-TV
1975–1976	New York Knicks	Play-by-play	WOR-TV
1975–1978	Boston Red Sox	Play-by-play	WSBK-TV
1976–1977	NFL on NBC	Play-by-play	NBC
1978–1993	NFL on CBS	Play-by-play	CBS
1981–1990	NBA on CBS	Play-by-play (lead)	CBS
1983–1995	College Basketball on CBS Sports	Play-by-play	CBS
1990–1992	Major League Baseball on CBS	#2 Play-by-play	CBS
1992–1994	Olympics on CBS	Announcer	CBS
1993–1995	Oakland Athletics	Play-by-play	KRON-TV
1994–2020	Fox NFL	Play-by-play; 1994–2006: #2, 2007–2010: #3, 2011–2012: #4, 2013–2019: #6, 2020: #7)	Fox
1995–2015	NBA on TNT	Play-by-play	TNT
1995	NHL on Fox	Play-by-play	Fox
1997–2013	Fox Major League Baseball	Play-by-play	Fox
2004–2007	San Antonio Spurs	Play-by-play (part-time)	FSN Southwest
2007–2015	Major League Baseball on TBS	Division Series play-by-play (2007–2013); Lead play-by-play (2007–2013); Part-time play-by-play (2014–2015)	TBS
2010–2020	Miami Dolphins	Preseason TV play-by-play	
2010	BCS on Fox Orange Bowl	Play-by-play	Fox
2013–2014	College Football on Fox	Play-by-play (fill-in)	Fox
2013–2016	Fox College Hoops	Play-by-play	Fox

Media offices

Preceded by Gary Bender	Lead play-by-play announcer, NBA on CBS; 1981–1990	Succeeded by None

Preceded by Gary Bender	Play-by-play announcer, NBA Finals; 1982–1990	Succeeded by Marv Albert

Preceded by Brent Musburger	Studio host, College Basketball on CBS; 1985	Succeeded by Jim Nantz

Preceded by Bob Costas	Secondary play-by-play announcer, Major League Baseball Game of the Week; 1990–1992	Succeeded by Greg Gumbel
