= Steve Farhood =

Steven Farhood
- Born: February 15, 1957 (age 68); Brooklyn, New York, U.S.
- Occupation: Boxing historian / analyst
- Known for: Tuesday Night Fights; ShoBox: The Next Generation
- Awards: Sam Taub Award (2002)

Steven Farhood (born 15 February 15, 1957) is an American boxing historian and analyst.

== Personal life and career ==
Farhood was born in Brooklyn, New York, to Lebanese parents. Farhood began writing for Stanley Weston's G.C. London publishing company in 1978, covering professional wrestling and boxing. Working for Weston, Farhood learned the concept and rules pertaining to kayfabe: the fictional aspect of professional wrestling.

“I specifically remember that the first time I was asked to do a wrestling article, they gave me a bunch of photos, they told me what was going on, and I said, ‘Okay, do you have the phone numbers of the wrestlers so I can get some quotes?’ And that was met with a lot of laughs, of course, because I didn’t know that you made up the quotes.”

He later served as editor-in-chief of The Ring and KO Magazine.

He also served as First Vice President of the Boxing Writers Association of America.

Farhood has been an on-air analyst for ESPN, CNN, SportsChannel and USA Network's Tuesday Night Fights. He currently serves as a commentator on Showtime's ShoBox: The New Generation.

In 2002 Farhood won the Sam Taub Award, which is given for "Excellence in Broadcasting Journalism".
