= Ross Greenburg =

American television executive

- Born: February 1, 1965 (age 61)
- Education: Brown University
- Occupations: Television and film producer
- Known for: President of HBO Sports
- Notable work: 61*, Miracle (2004 film)
- Television: Inside the NFL, Real Sports with Bryant Gumbel

Ross Greenburg (born 1955) was president of HBO Sports from 2000 to 2011. He is a member of the Sports Broadcasting Hall of Fame. He was the executive producer of the movies 61* and Miracle.

== Early life and education ==
Greenburg grew up in Scarsdale, New York. He attended Brown University, where he worked as an assistant writer for the sports news director at WPRI-TV Providence. He graduated in 1977 with a degree in political science.

== Career ==
Greenburg spent 33 years at HBO Sports. He served as VP and executive producer from 1985-1990 and then as Senior VP and executive producer from 1990-2000. In 2000, Greenburg became President and served in that position until 2011. During his tenure, he won 56 Sports Emmys and 8 Peabody Awards. He succeeded Seth Abraham as president.

Greenburg produced the sports documentary series, Sports of the 20th Century, and the sports magazine show, Real Sports with Bryant Gumbel, for HBO Sports. He was also the producer of Inside the NFL, a football studio show hosted by Bob Costas, Dan Marino, Cris Carter, and Cris Collinsworth and HBO World Championship Boxing.

Following his tenure at HBO, Greenburg created Ross Greenburg Productions.

In 2016, Greenburg took a teaching position at Iona College, where he served as Executive-in-Residence for the 2018-2019 academic year. He also served as an adjunct professor and advisory sports member.

== Awards & Recognition ==
1990: Won the Sam Taub Award for excellence in boxing broadcasting journalism.

2004: Inducted into the Brown University Hall of Fame.

2022: Inducted into the Sports Broadcasting Hall of Fame.

== Personal life ==
Greenburg resides in Westchester County, New York, with his wife, Michele, and two children, twins Brad and Rachel.

He has a brother, Michael Greenburg, who is also a producer and known for the “MacGyver” and “Quest for the Stanley Cup” TV series.
