= Dan Hicks (sportscaster) =

American sportscaster (1962–2026)

- Hicks in 2020
- Born: John Daniel Hicks; June 2, 1962; Tucson, Arizona, U.S.
- Died: November 11, 2026 (aged 64); Connecticut, U.S.
- Education: University of Arizona (B.A.)
- Occupation: Sportscaster
- Years active: 1984–2026
- Television: KVOA-TV (1986‍–‍1989); CNN (1989‍–‍1992); NBC Sports (1992‍–‍2026)
- Spouse: Hannah Storm (m. 1994)
- Children: 3

John Daniel Hicks (June 2, 1962 – November 11, 2026) was an American sportscaster who worked for NBC Sports from 1992 until his death. He was a lead announcer for Golf on NBC from 2000, the lead play-by-play announcer for Notre Dame Football on NBC from 2013 to 2016 and from 2024, and covered 16 Olympic Games. During his career, he also called games for the NFL on NBC, worked for NBA on NBC, and called five French Opens for Tennis on NBC.

Born in Tucson, Arizona, Hicks was interested in sports journalism as a child. He graduated from the University of Arizona in 1984 where he was involved in sports journalism and announcing. Before joining NBC Sports, he began his career in radio at KCEE/KWFM and worked as a television sportscaster at KVOA in Tucson, and then joined CNN's sports team in Atlanta. Hicks married fellow sports journalist Hannah Storm in 1994 and the couple had three daughters.

Hicks's well known calls include Tiger Woods's putt on the 18th hole at the 2008 U.S. Open, where he said: "Expect anything different?" and J. J. Spaun's 64 foot putt on the final hole of the 2025 U.S. Open where he exclaimed: "How ... About ... One?!" At the 2008 Summer Olympics, Hicks and Rowdy Gaines called the United States' come-from-behind win in the men's 4×100 meter freestyle relay.

Hicks died of multifocal pneumonia in Connecticut at the age of 64. Broadcasters and athletes paid tribute to him. The PGA Tour called his partnership with Johnny Miller one of golf television's defining broadcast partnerships.

== Early life and education ==
John Daniel Hicks was born in Tucson, Arizona, on June 2, 1962. He was raised by his parents James and Diane Hicks. He was the youngest of three siblings. He had two older sisters Jennifer and Katy. His father was a United States Air Force veteran, earned a business administration degree from Western Michigan University, and then worked in procurement with the Missile Systems Group at Hughes Aircraft Company in Tucson. His mother was a graduate of the University of Michigan and Western Michigan University and worked as an elementary school teacher. She later worked as a travel agent and travelled extensively in retirement.

He was interested in sports journalism at a young age. He would tell his mom: "I'm going to have an NBC Sports job." In elementary school, he would imitate the voice of sportscaster Howard Cosell. As a kid, he played basketball, baseball, and football. In high school, he sat in the bleachers at Hi Corbett Field during Tucson Toros games where he would record his play-by-play on tape. He graduated from Sabino High School in 1980.

He graduated from the University of Arizona in 1984. He wrote for the Arizona Daily Wildcat, The Tombstone Epitaph, and the Tucson Citizen (high school football stringer). His first job was a public address announcer in the Arizona Stadium press box, where he gave the details of each play to guests in the luxury suites and those seated on press row. He was also the public address announcer first at intramural basketball games and then at Arizona Wildcats women's volleyball and basketball games. He was a member of the fraternity Sigma Phi Epsilon.

== Career ==
Hicks began his career in radio for KCEE/KWFM in Tucson, earning five dollars per spot on radio. In December 1986, the news director gave him an opportunity to present the six o'clock sports segment after the news presentation. He was a weekend sports anchor on KVOA-TV, the NBC affiliate in Tucson. He worked alongside Patty Weiss. One colleague remembered that Hicks was given the opportunity to do the sports segment with no prior TV experience, and he performed so well that he was hired. At KVOA, he was a part of the sports team known as "the Dandest" with three Dans.

Hicks moved east in 1989 to work as a sports reporter for CNN in Atlanta, where he was a weekend host on Sports Tonight. Bill MacPhail was president of CNN Sports and hired Hicks and his future wife Hannah Storm. Dan Patrick had just left the network, and Keith Olbermann, Vince Cellini and Gary Miller worked at CNN at the time. In an interview, he described CNN as the underdog to ESPN, but a good place to work and learn.

=== Football ===
==== NFL ====
Hicks was a play-by-play announcer for the NFL on NBC starting in 1992 when NBC had the AFC package, continuing until the final season in 1997. His commentary partners during this time included: Joe Namath, Joe Gibbs, Jim Kelly, Bob Trumpy and Cris Collinsworth.

He called the AFC Wildcard matchup with Mike Mayock in January 2014 (2013 NFL season), where the Indianapolis Colts defeated the Kansas City Chiefs (45–44). The Colts trailed 38–10 and won on a 64-yard touchdown pass from Andrew Luck to T. Y. Hilton in the final minutes. It was the second-biggest comeback in NFL playoff history.

==== Notre Dame Football ====
In 2011, Hicks first filled in for Tom Hammond during Notre Dame Football on NBC as a play-by-play announcer in the season opener against South Florida Bulls football. During the 2012 season, Hicks covered the Irish's game against Pittsburgh Panthers football, which was a triple overtime win.

He replaced Hammond as play-by-play commentator in 2013. During the 2013 season, Hick was in the booth with Mike Mayock and Alex Flanagan on the sideline. He continued to call NBC's Notre Dame package through the 2016 season. At the start of the 2017 season, Hicks was replaced by Mike Tirico. After a seven-season hiatus, NBC announced Hicks would return to the Notre Dame package for the 2024 season.

=== NBA ===
Hicks worked as a sideline reporter for the NBA on NBC. He covered from NBA from 1992 until 2000 for NBC.

=== Golf ===
Hicks was an announcer for NBC's golf coverage, Golf on NBC, beginning in 1992. He called his first U.S. Open in 1992 at Shinnecock Hills Golf Club. When Dick Enberg left NBC for CBS in 2000, he was promoted to the lead spot. He spent sixteen years with Johnny Miller as lead analysts for NBC Golf. Miller retired in 2019 during the Phoenix Open. Paul Azinger replaced him as lead with Hicks.

In addition to coverage of tournaments on the PGA Tour, Hicks covered the The Players Championship, Tour Championship, U.S. Open (golf), The Open Championship, The Ryder Cup, and the Presidents Cup. He had covered the U.S. Senior Open. He covered the U.S. Women's Open.

Hicks called twenty-two U.S. Opens. A memorable call from Hicks occurred during the 2008 U.S. Open where he said. "expect anything different" when Tiger Woods made a putt on the last hole at Torrey Pines Golf Course. At the 2025 U.S. Open at Oakmont Country Club, J. J. Spaun was even par at the 18th hole and one stroke ahead of Robert MacIntyre. Spaun had a 64-foot putt. A two-putt would have won Spaun the major tournament, but he made the putt for a birdie, and Hicks in the tower at 18 made the call: "How ... About ... One?!"

=== Olympics ===
Hicks covered 16 Olympic Games with 15 as a play-by-play announcer. He was regularly involved in NBC's Olympic Games coverage. Hicks also hosted the former CNBC show The Olympic Show.

==== Summer ====
Hicks began covering the summer Olympics for NBC at the Barcelona 1992 Summer Olympics as a studio analyst and then doing play by play at the Atlanta 1996 Summer Olympics. He also did play by play and analysis at the Sydney 2000 Summer Olympics, the Athens 2004 Summer Olympics, the Beijing 2008 Summer Olympics, the London 2012 Summer Olympics, the Rio 2016 Summer Olympics, the Tokyo 2020 Summer Olympics held in 2021, and the Paris 2024 Summer Olympics. He was the stroke-by-stroke announcer for swimming, a role he has held since 1996 with lead color commentator Rowdy Gaines. He called thousands of races together with Gaines.

At the 2000 Summer Olympics, Hicks called diving, a role he returned to for a single day at the 2012 Summer Olympics in London, subbing for Ted Robinson, who was assigned to call the gold medal match in men's tennis on the same day.

At the 2004 Summer Olympics, Hicks served as late-night anchor. Pat O'Brien served as late-night host for the first week of the games because of Hicks's swimming duties.

One of Hicks's most memorable calls came during the men's 4×100 freestyle relay at the 2008 Summer Olympics, as he announced the USA's come-from-behind win over France:

The United States trying to hang on to second; they should get the Silver medal. Australia is in Bronze territory right now, but Lezak is closing a little bit on Bernard. Can the veteran chase him down and pull off a shocker here? "Well there's no doubt that he's tightening up!" Bernard is losing some ground. Here comes Lezak! UNBELIEVABLE AT THE END! HE'S DONE IT! THE U.S. HAS DONE IT! "HE DID IT!" A NEW WORLD RECORD! "HE DID IT! HE DID IT!" Phelps's hope's alive!

— Dan Hicks and Rowdy Gaines calling the final lap of the 4×100 m relay.

Hicks called all 28 of Michael Phelps's Olympic medal winning races from 2004 through 2016.

==== Winter ====
At the 2002 Winter Olympics, Hicks served as late-night anchor. He was the play-by-play announcer for speed skating for the Winter Olympics in 2002, 2006 and 2010. He moved to alpine skiing for the 2014 and 2018 Games, taking over for the retired Tim Ryan, in addition to formerly serving as co-host of the Closing Ceremony.

For the 2022 Winter Olympics in Beijing, Hicks called the games from the NBC Sports headquarters in Stamford, Connecticut, remotely because of very strict COVID-19 pandemic protocols in China.

For the 2026 Winter Olympics, Hicks called ski racing. These games were his 15th Olympic play-by-play assignment. He worked alongside analyst Steve Porino, Ted Ligety and Picabo Street.

=== Tennis ===
Hicks covered five French Opens for NBC. In 2019, Hicks did play-by-play for the 2019 French Open at Roland-Garros in Paris, where he called semifinals and finals. Others who were a part of NBC's broadcast: Mike Tirico, Mary Carillo and John McEnroe. Hicks also did play-by-play for the finals weekend at the 2020 French Open, 2021 French Open, 2022 French Open, and the 2023 French Open.

=== Winter sports ===
He called some World Cup skiing events from NBC Sports headquarters in Stamford, Connecticut.

== Broadcasting style and legacy ==
Hicks was best known as a play-by-play announcer for golf, Olympic swimming, and Notre Dame football. He was known for his conversational, calm, and collaborative approach. He believed that announcers should not let their own talk take over the broadcast, and his commentary was praised for that. Mike Tirico said of Hicks after his death: "I can’t think of a big moment that Dan didn’t have the right call, the right energy, the right words." Ted Ligety, a skiing analyst at NBC's Winter Olympics coverage, said Hicks knew a great deal about many sports and that "he asked a million questions and was really curious".

Hicks felt that the game of golf suited his broadcasting style best. Hicks described his approach in a 2021 interview with Claude Harmon III. He said his guiding principle on any sports broadcast is that "It’s about the game." He said the hardest part of a golf broadcast was organizing a large amount of information when the action intensifies. At the crescendos in a golf broadcast, he would aim to remain calm.The PGA Tour called his partnership with Johnny Miller one golf television's defining broadcast partnerships: "While Miller became known for his candid analysis, Hicks provided a measured counterbalance, guiding viewers through the tension and unpredictability of the final round." He had been ranked as one of the best broadcasters in golf. John Hawkins of Sports Illustrated praised his knowledge of the game.

Rowdy Gaines said Hicks called swimming during a golden age of the sport and knew better than anyone how to present it to the American audience. Gaines said he made viewers care about the athletes because he cared about them. His best known call came in the U.S. comeback win in the men’s 4x100 freestyle relay at the 2008 Beijing Olympics. Gaines called it "the greatest race in history, without a doubt". Hicks's voice reached a crescendo when Jason Lezak touched the wall.

== Personal life ==
While at CNN, Hicks met his wife, Hannah Storm, currently an anchor on ESPN's SportsCenter; they were married on January 8, 1994. The couple lived in Greenwich, Connecticut, with their three daughters: Hannah, Ellery, and Riley Hicks. Storm is an alumna of Notre Dame.

Hicks remained close with his family. At his 2022 induction into the University of Arizona School of Journalism Hall of Fame, Hicks thanked his father and two sisters, who were present, along with his late mother for instilling in him the belief that he "could do anything".

Hicks played recreational golf and was a member at Winged Foot Golf Club in Mamaroneck, New York. He had said he was a 7 or 8 handicap in golf.

=== Death ===
Hicks died from multifocal pneumonia in Connecticut on November 11, 2026, at the age of 64. Numerous athletes and journalists posted tributes to Hicks, including Tiger Woods, Jordan Spieth, Michael Phelps, Mikaela Shiffrin, and Lindsey Vonn. His fellow commentator Rowdy Gaines was devastated by the loss of Hicks. Other commentators to post tributes included Al Michaels, Ernie Johnson Jr., Mike Tirico, and Scott Van Pelt. The PGA Tour issued a statement after Hicks's death. USA Swimming also released a statement: "His voice was the backdrop to many iconic Olympic moments in our sport's history, and his presence will be greatly missed in the swim, sports, and broadcast communities." There was a celebration of life at Winged Foot.

== Awards and honors ==
- Sports Emmy Award for coverage of 2024 Summer Olympics, Outstanding Live Special – Championship Event.
- Hicks was inducted into the Pima County, Arizona Sports Hall of Fame (2023).
- University of Arizona, School of Journalism, Hall of Fame (2022)
- Metropolitan Golf Association's Distinguished Service Award (2020)
- 2012 University of Arizona, College of Social and Behavioral Sciences, Alumni of the Year

== Credits and coverage ==
Year	Title or Event	Role	Notes
1992–2000	NBA on NBC	Reporter (1992–97); Play-by-play (1997–2000)	
1992–2026	Golf on NBC	Golf on NBC	
1992–1997; 2014	NFL on NBC	Play-by-play	
1994	Nutcracker on Ice	Host in original telecast	Served as the host with his wife Hannah Storm
2011–2016; 2024–2026	Notre Dame Football on NBC	Play-by-play (lead)	Appeared in the booth with Mike Mayock, Jason Garrett, and Doug Flutie
2012	2012 Pro Bowl	Play-by-play	Called the game with Mike Mayock and Doug Flutie with Alex Flanagan and Randy Moss on the sidelines
2019–2023	Tennis on NBC	Play-by-play	Covered five French Opens
2021	Cracking the Code	Himself	Documentary about team captain Paul Azinger's strategy that was inspired by the United States Navy SEALs at the 2008 Ryder Cup
2026	The Hawk	Himself	Appears as himself in two episodes
