= Junkin' with Val and Dave =

- Created by: Dave Bird
- Written by: Dave Bird
- Directed by: Rod Howell
- Starring: Val Myers; Dave Bird
- Country of origin: United States
- No. of seasons: 4
- No. of episodes: 72

Production
- Producer: Dave Bird
- Camera setup: Single-camera
- Running time: 30 minutes

Original release
- Network: Turner South
- Release: July 12, 2003 – May 2006

Junkin' with Val and Dave is an American television show which aired on the Turner South cable network. The program was Turner South's highest rated original production.

The show followed hosts Val Myers and Dave Bird (who was also the show's creator and executive producer) as they traveled throughout the Southeast visiting flea markets and yard sales, each episode based in a different city. During a typical program, Val and Dave chatted with sellers and bought merchandise they found interesting, then sold the items on eBay and donated the money to charity. Auction results were broadcast in subsequent episodes.

== Awards ==
During its four seasons in production, the series won two Southeast Regional Emmy Awards:

- 2004: Outstanding Achievement: Television Programming Excellence, Entertainment Program (for episode #113, "Foley, Alabama")
- 2006: Outstanding Achievement: Television Special Achievement Excellence, Interactivity
