= Gil Clancy =

American boxer, boxing trainer

Gilbert Thomas Clancy (May 30, 1922 – March 31, 2011) was a Hall of Fame boxing trainer and one of the most noted television boxing commentators of the 1980s and 1990s.

Clancy became famous as a trainer for world champion Emile Griffith, and later worked with other famous boxing world champions and top contenders such as George Foreman, Jerry Quarry, Ken Buchanan, and Gerry Cooney, including Cooney in his fight with Foreman.

In the 1990s, he worked with Oscar De La Hoya, coming out of retirement to do so. Clancy was Emile Griffith's only trainer and guided him to world championships in the welterweight and middleweight classes.

He is a member of the International Boxing Hall of Fame. In 1983, he won the Sam Taub Award for excellence in boxing broadcasting journalism. As a broadcaster, he worked for CBS and HBO and was ringside for numerous world championship fights, including the brutal fights between Roberto Durán and Davey Moore, and Marvelous Marvin Hagler and John "The Beast" Mugabi. Also for Hagler vs. Sugar Ray Leonard as well as the "One For The Ages" fight between Michael Moorer and George Foreman. Clancy also hosted and produced Gil Clancy's Boxing Journal on the FNN/Score cable TV network.

== Personal life ==
Clancy and his wife, Nancy, had six children and several grandchildren and great-grandchildren.
