= Fred Hickman =

American broadcaster (1956–2022)

- Hickman in 1989
- Born: October 17, 1956; Springfield, Illinois, U.S.
- Died: November 9, 2022 (aged 66); Kissimmee, Florida, U.S.
- Years active: 1977–2022
- Employer: Nexstar Broadcasting
- Known for: Original co-host of the CNN show Sports Tonight (1980) Work as sportscaster for various ESPN programs, which include ESPN SportsCenter ESPN Classic and NBA Coast to Coast
- Spouse(s): Sheila Bowers Hickman, Denise Hickman Judith Tillman
- Awards: New York Sports Emmy Award Winner (2004)

Frederick Hickman (October 17, 1956 – November 9, 2022) was an American sports broadcaster with CNN, TBS, YES Network, and ESPN. He was later an anchor and managing editor for the evening newscast of the African-American cable news channel Black News Channel. Hickman was an original co-host of the CNN show Sports Tonight in 1980. He received CableACE awards in 1989 and 1993, and was a New York Sports Emmy Award Winner in 2004.

== Early life and education ==
Hickman was born on October 17, 1956, in Springfield, Illinois, to George Henry and Louise Winifred Hickman. He graduated from Springfield Southeast High School in 1974, then attended Coe College in Cedar Rapids, Iowa from 1974 to 1978, where he earned a B.S. in sociology. While there he worked at the low power KCOE-FM radio station.

== Career ==
In 1977, Hickman began his professional radio broadcasting career as a news anchor at KLWW-AM in Cedar Rapids, Iowa. After leaving Coe College, Hickman moved back to his hometown of Springfield, Illinois to work at the radio station WFMB-AM, where he was responsible for playing country music. In February 1978, at age 21, Hickman became an anchor and sports director of the Springfield television station WICS-TV. He stayed there until May 1980.

=== CNN and TBS ===
In 1980 Hickman joined the young cable television company Turner Broadcasting System (TBS) in Atlanta, Georgia, working with Nick Charles as part of a four-person sports department for the company's Cable News Network (CNN). The duo took to the air on June 1, 1980, as hosts of CNN Sports Tonight, a nightly sports wrap-up show in which Hickman and Charles reported scores and events, showed highlights of college and professional games, and selected a "Play of the Day". The show was a nightly rival to ESPN's SportsCenter, which Hickman later joined.

In 1984, Hickman briefly left CNN to serve as a sports anchor for WDIV, the NBC affiliate in Detroit, Michigan. He served as an anchor, a beat reporter for the Detroit Tigers, and a boxing specialist from June 1984 to May 1985.

In November 1986, he returned to TBS to serve as a co-anchor with Charles for CNN. He remained with CNN until September 2001, and while there served as host for both the NBA and NFL pre-game and post-game shows, a commentator on the Atlanta Hawks, and a co-host of the Olympic Winter Games in Albertville, France in 1992, the Olympic Winter Games in Lillehammer, Norway in 1994, and the 1994 Goodwill Games in St. Petersburg, Russia.

In 1999, Hickman was part of a news story when he reported on the millennium celebrations in New York during CNN's coverage of the event.

Hickman also served as a Master of Ceremonies, speaker and guest panelist at the Butkus award and the Eddie Robinson Award as well as narrator for TBS’s contribution to Bob Ballard’s National Geographic specials, including the recovery of the Titanic.

Hickman caused a controversy in 2000 when he cast his first place vote for the NBA Most Valuable Player Award for Allen Iverson. Hickman was the sole voter who did not cast his first place vote that year for Shaquille O'Neal, preventing O'Neal from becoming the first unanimous MVP in NBA history. Iverson finished seventh in the voting.

=== YES Network ===
Hickman left Atlanta in October 2001 to join the New York City-based YES Network for its 2002 launch. He was their original anchor, hosting the pre-game and the post-game shows for New York Yankees telecasts. While there he hosted pre-game and post-game shows for New Jersey Nets cablecasts, as well as the weekly Yankees Magazine. He remained at YES until November 2004.

=== ESPN ===
In late 2004, after the completion of three baseball seasons and two NBA seasons with the YES network, Hickman left to join ESPN in Bristol, Connecticut. During his tenure at ESPN, Hickman hosted ESPN's flagship shows including SportsCenter, Baseball Tonight, ESPN Classic, NBA Shoot Around, and NBA Coast to Coast. He also appeared as a fill-in host on ESPN radio and briefly hosted ESPNEWS. Hickman left the network in May 2008.

=== Fox Sports ===
Hickman joined as host of the Braves Live pre & post game show for the 2009 and 2010 seasons on Fox Sports South, based in Atlanta, Georgia. He hosted the In My Own Words interview show.

=== Other ===
In September 2010, Fred Hickman formed Fred Hickman Communications, Inc. The company provides broadcaster training for retired athletes and media training services for athletes, coaching staff and sports industry front office personnel. Hickman also worked as a speaker, spokesperson, event host, voice over artist and narrator.

=== WVUE ===
In August 2011, Fred Hickman resigned from Fox Sports South to become the new sports director for WVUE, a Fox affiliate in New Orleans.

=== WVLA ===
In August 2015, Hickman joined WVLA-TV, Nexstar's NBC affiliate in Baton Rouge, Louisiana as a news anchor. He stayed there until his departure in July 2018.

=== WDVM ===
In August 2018, Hickman came over from WVLA-TV to join sister independent station WDVM-TV in Hagerstown, Maryland. According to the station's Website, he was a news anchor and producer.

== Death ==
Hickman died of liver cancer at a hospital in Kissimmee, Florida, on November 9, 2022, at the age of 66.

In the months before his death, Hickman wrote an autobiography, Channeling: My Life On Air, Off Air, and In Living Color. Scorecard Press released the book posthumously in March 2026.

== Honors ==
Hickman was nominated for CableACE awards (Award for Cable Excellence) for best sports host every year from 1988 to 1993, winning in 1989 and 1993. In 1993, he was named "sexiest sportscaster" by the U.S. Television Fan Association. He was a New York Sports Emmy Award Winner in 2004, and was added to the Springfield Sports Hall of Fame in 2007.
