= Turner South =

Former American cable and satellite TV network

- Country: United States
- Broadcast area: Regionally available in Alabama, Georgia, Mississippi, Tennessee, South Carolina, and portions of western North Carolina
- Headquarters: Turner Entertainment Techwood Campus

Programming
- Language: English
- Picture format: 480i (SDTV)

Ownership
- Owner: Turner Broadcasting System/Time Warner

History
- Launched: October 1, 1999; 26 years ago
- Closed: October 13, 2006; 19 years ago
- Replaced by: SportSouth

Turner South was an American cable and satellite television network that was owned by the Turner Broadcasting System division of Time Warner. At its peak, Turner South reached approximately eight million subscribers across a six-state region comprising Alabama, Georgia, Mississippi, Tennessee, South Carolina, and portions of western North Carolina (roughly from Asheville to Charlotte).

== History ==
The channel launched on October 1, 1999 as the first regional entertainment network developed especially for viewers in the southern United States. Turner South's programming consisted of a mix of movies, drama series, sitcoms, regional news updates, and unique original programming. It also carried telecasts of professional sporting events from the Atlanta Braves Major League Baseball, Atlanta Hawks NBA, and Atlanta Thrashers NHL franchises, all of which were owned by the Turner Broadcasting System at the network's launch.

Turner South's original programs could be broadly termed "southern lifestyle", including cooking and gardening shows. The sitcoms and dramas featured on the network (such as Major Dad and In the Heat of the Night) also tended to appeal to Southerners, or were set in the South. Other series included Liars & Legends and Off The Menu which was based out of the Commander's Palace restaurant in New Orleans. Beginning in 2002, the channel also aired a live simulcast of radio program The Rick and Bubba Show.

=== News Corporation lawsuit ===
News Corporation filed a lawsuit against Turner Broadcasting and its corporate parent Time Warner in a Georgia Superior Court on June 15, 1999, citing that the plans Turner had unveiled to carry sports events on Turner South violated a non-compete agreement that the two companies signed as part of News Corporation's $65 million purchase of SportSouth (which would become Fox Sports South) in 1996, which prohibited Turner from launching a regional sports network in the southeastern United States until 2008. The suit was settled out of court with undisclosed terms.

=== Sale to Fox ===
On February 23, 2006, Fox Cable Networks, a subsidiary of News Corporation, agreed to purchase Turner South, for a reported $375 million. On May 1, 2006, Fox took over operations of the cable network, and the bulk of the Turner South schedule, including Rick and Bubba and the movie blocks, was discontinued. During the brief transition period which followed, repeats of Turner South's lifestyle and how-to programming (including Blue Ribbon, Home Plate, Home Makers, and Junkin') were aired in two weekday blocks (from 8:00-11:00 a.m. and 3:00-5:00 p.m. ET). Much of the remaining programming was repurposed from various Fox Sports Networks properties, most notably Fox Sports South.

On October 13, 2006, the network was officially relaunched as a second iteration of SportSouth, and was eventually renamed Fox Sports Southeast in October 2015. After Fox's sale of that property in 2019, it was rebranded as Bally Sports Southeast, operated with Bally Sports South (now FanDuel Sports Network Southeast and FanDuel Sports Network South respectively).
