= Al Bernstein =

American journalist (born 1950)

Al Bernstein (born September 15, 1950) is an American sportscaster, writer, stage performer, recording artist, and speaker.

== Journalism career ==
In the 1970s, Bernstein was a newspaperman, working at Lerner Newspapers in Chicago. He eventually became a managing editor at that newspaper.

In 1978, he wrote Boxing For Beginners, an instructional and historical book on boxing. He also wrote for Boxing Illustrated and The Ring during this period.

In 2012, Bernstein released 30 Years, 30 Undeniable Truths About Boxing, Sports and TV.

== Broadcasting ==
In 1980, Bernstein joined ESPN as a Top Rank Boxing series boxing analyst. He stayed at ESPN until 2003, and during that time, he also worked as a reporter for SportsCenter, covering major boxing matches, Major League Baseball, the NBA and the NFL draft. He also wrote and hosted the series Big Fights Boxing Hour for ESPN Classic. In 1988, he won the Sam Taub Award for excellence in boxing broadcasting journalism and in 2012 he was inducted into the International Boxing Hall of Fame. It was announced in December 2012 that he would be inducted into the Nevada Boxing Hall of Fame as one of their inaugural inductees in 2013 in the Media category.

In 1992 and 1996, he served as the boxing analyst for NBC's coverage of the Summer Olympic Games. From 1999–2002, he was a sports anchor for KVVU news in Las Vegas.

From 2003-2023, Bernstein served as the boxing analyst on Showtime for Showtime Championship Boxing.

He has been Channel 5's main boxing analyst since 2011. He tends to wear the same blue shirt often, though he claims he has two of them.

In October 2025, Bernstein was named among the inductees for the 2026 International Women's Boxing Hall of Fame class in the non-boxing category.

== Music ==
In 1988, Bernstein recorded his first album My Very Own Songs, with original songs written by Tony Rome, about television and sports. He released Let The Games Begin in 1996. In 1998, he also began a career as a live musical performer. Since then he has performed at major casinos such as Caesars Palace, the Mandalay Bay and The Riviera, as well as many Indian and Riverboat casinos around the United States.

== Filmography ==
| Year | Title | Role | Notes |
|---|---|---|---|
| 1990 | Rocky V | Fight Commentator #2 | |
| 1999 | Play It to the Bone | Sportswriter | |
| 2003 | Stuey | Himself | |
| 2015 | Inside Mayweather vs. Pacquiao | Himself | Television Documentary, 2 episodes |
| 2016 | Bleed for This | Announcer at Duran Fight | |
