= Daryn Kagan =

American broadcast journalist (born 1963)

Daryn A. Kagan
- Born: 1963 (age 62–63)
- Occupation: Broadcast journalist

Daryn A. Kagan (b. 1963) is an American broadcast journalist who was formerly a news anchor for CNN.

From 1994 to 2006, Kagan served as an anchor and correspondent for CNN, in CNN's corporate headquarters of Atlanta, Georgia. She anchored CNN Live Today shown from 10am-12pm Eastern Time for eight years. She also served as host of the CNN/People news entertainment program, People in the News, and earlier served as a CNN sports reporter and anchor.

== Early life and education ==
Kagan grew up in a secular Jewish family in Beverly Hills, California. She is a 1981 graduate of Beverly Hills High School where she ran cross-country, and a 1985 graduate of Stanford University.

== Career ==
=== Broadcasting 1985-2006 ===
After graduation Kagan was hired for an on-air job at a Santa Barbara television station, KEYT-TV. From there, she moved to a general assignment reporting position at KTVK, which is based in Phoenix, where she went on to take the additional role of weekend sports anchor in addition to her weekday reporting duties.

After KTVK did not renew Kagan's contract, Jim Walton, the head of CNN/SI, hired Kagan as sports anchor and correspondent. She went on to cover major sporting events including the Super Bowl, the NBA Playoffs, and international figure skating championships from Russia. Kagan later moved to CNN's news division and became a main CNN news anchor and correspondent.

In this role, Kagan reported on presidential and mid-term elections. She reported on-site from the Middle East during the second Gulf War and the Washington, D.C. sniper attack investigation. Kagan traveled to Africa with musician Bono where she reported on AIDS and famine for all of the CNN networks. While in Africa, Kagan maintained a daily blog on CNN.com of her reports and experiences. Additionally, she reported several Academy Awards ceremonies and the Monterey Jazz Festival.

Kagan is one of a handful of national news anchors who was on the air live during the terrorist attacks on the morning of September 11, 2001. She reported throughout the day and, in later days, covered the unfolding story from CNN headquarters in Atlanta and from the network's Washington, D.C. bureau.

After CNN declined to renew her employment contract, Kagan left CNN on September 1, 2006, to launch a personal news website, DarynKagan.com, on November 13, 2006. The Boston Globe described Kagan's site as having "buck[ed] the media tide with an emphasis on stories that illustrate the triumph of the human spirit." In an interview with the Los Angeles Times, Kagan discussed her career, and said "I think it's really important to be informed. I just also think it's important to be inspired."

Kagan went on to extend her DarynKagan.com brand of content to television news documentaries, radio, and books. Her first TV film, Breaking the Curse, aired on PBS and won the 2008 Gracie Award for Outstanding Documentary. Kagan produced and narrated the film, which told the story of an American woman fighting for those living with leprosy in India. Kagan's first book, What's Possible!, was released in 2008 by Meredith Books, and was described by the Associated Press as "stories about people who overcame obstacles to achieve dreams." Her next documentary, Solartown USA, was about a Wisconsin town that made a commitment to solar power in the 1970s. Oprah Radio began to run DarynKagan.com content each day beginning in March 2009 on SIRIUS XM radio.

== Personal life ==
Kagan sees her story as one of "reinvention," and speaks around the country on that topic. She is Jewish, and her great-grandfather was a Russian immigrant named Eiser Cohen who came to the United States through Ellis Island and settled in Milwaukee, Wisconsin. Her grandfather, Jack Kagan, later moved to the Los Angeles area. Her mother, Phyllis Kagan, is a breast cancer survivor who has appeared on CNN discussing the disease. Kagan has a younger sister named Kallan, an executive at Arc Productions, and an older brother named Mark.

In September 2004, Kagan became romantically involved with radio talk show host Rush Limbaugh, but they broke up in February 2006. Kagan is married to Trent Swanson and is stepmother to his two daughters. The marriage took place sometime before 2015.

Kagan has adopted a three-legged cat, Tripod, and a dog, Darla Louise, from rescue shelters.
