= Sam Taub Award =

American boxing award

- Sport: Boxing
- Awarded for: "Excellence in Broadcasting Journalism"
- Country: U.S.
- Presented by: Boxing Writers Association of America

History
- First award: 1982

The Sam Taub Award is an award conferred annually by the Boxing Writers Association of America for Excellence in Broadcasting Journalism. The award is named after Sam Taub, a journalist and radio broadcaster who is best known for his work covering boxing. It is similar to Major League Baseball's Ford C. Frick Award.

== Past recipients ==
- 1982 -- Don Dunphy
- 1983 -- Gil Clancy
- 1984 -- John F.X. Condon
- 1985 -- Larry Merchant
- 1986 -- Tim Ryan
- 1987 -- Alex Wallau
- 1988 -- Al Bernstein
- 1989 -- Sam Rosen
- 1990 -- Ross Greenburg
- 1991 -- Reg Gutteridge
- 1992 -- Jim Lampley and Barry Tompkins
- 1993 -- Bob Yalen
- 1994—No winner
- 1995 -- Al Albert and Sean O'Grady
- 1996—No winner
- 1997 -- Dave Bontempo
- 1998 -- Bob Sheridan
- 1999—No winner
- 2000—No winner
- 2001 -- Teddy Atlas
- 2002 -- Steve Farhood
- 2003 -- Bernardo Osuna
- 2004 -- Brian Kenny
- 2005 -- Jay Larkin and Rich Marotta
- 2006 -- Steve Albert
- 2007 -- Nick Charles
- 2008 -- Harold Lederman
- 2009 -- Joe Tessitore
- 2010—No winner
- 2011—No winner
- 2012 -- Max Kellerman
- 2013 -- Paulie Malignaggi
- 2014 -- Seth Abraham
- 2015—Marc Payton, Mark Taffet
- 2016—Gordon Hall
- 2017 –– Lou DiBella
- 2018 –– Stephen Espinoza
- 2019 –– Andre Ward
- 2020—No winner
- 2021—No winner
- 2022 –– David Dinkins Jr.
- 2023 –– Tim Bradley
- 2024 –– Marv Albert
- 2025 –– Roy Jones Jr.
