= Hannah Storm =

American sportscaster (born 1962)

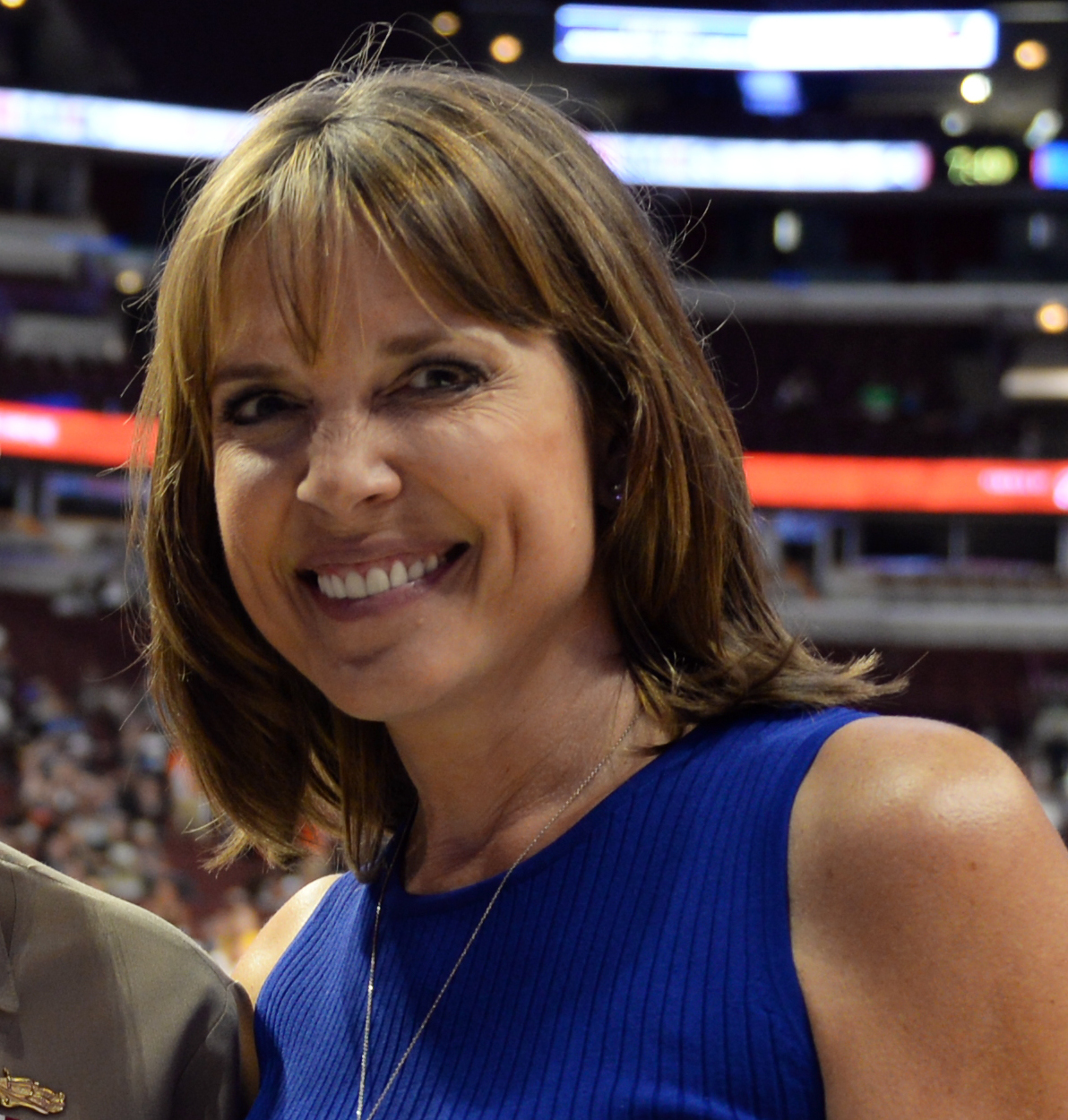
- Storm at the 2017 Warrior Games
- Born: Hannah Lynn Storen; June 13, 1962 (age 64); Oak Park, Illinois, U.S.
- Education: University of Notre Dame
- Occupations: Television journalist; television personality; author; sports anchor
- Years active: 1984–present
- Spouse: Dan Hicks (m. 1994; died 2026)
- Children: 3

Hannah Lynn Storen Hicks (born June 13, 1962), known professionally as Hannah Storm, is an American television sports journalist, serving as the anchor of ESPN's SportsCenter. She was also host of the NBA Countdown pregame show on ABC as part of the network's National Basketball Association (NBA) Sunday game coverage.

== Early life and career ==
Storm was born in Oak Park, Illinois, and is the daughter of sports executive Mike Storen, who was a commissioner of the American Basketball Association, general manager of that league's Indiana Pacers, Kentucky Colonels and Memphis Sounds franchises, and president of the Atlanta Hawks in the NBA. Her mother, Hannah G. Storen, is a real estate broker. Storm graduated from The Westminster Schools, in Atlanta, Georgia, and in 1983 from the University of Notre Dame.

Storm took her on-air name during her stint as a disc jockey for a hard rock radio station in Corpus Christi, Texas, in the early 1980s. While at Notre Dame, she worked for WNDU-TV, the then-Notre Dame-owned NBC affiliate in South Bend, Indiana. After graduation, she took a job as a disc jockey at KNCN (C-101) in Corpus Christi, Texas. Six months later, she got a job at a Houston rock station KSRR 97 Rock as the drive-time sportscaster and traffic reporter Storm stayed in Houston for four years doing a variety of radio and television jobs, including hosting the Houston Rockets halftime and postgame shows and also hosted Houston Astros postgame shows on KTXH television. She worked as a weekend sports anchor on WPCQ-TV/WCNC-TV in Charlotte, North Carolina, from 1988 to 1989. She transitioned to CNN from there.

== National career ==
=== CNN ===
Storm's national experience began as the first female host on CNN Sports Tonight from 1989 to 1992. She also hosted Major League Baseball Preview and reported from spring training, the playoffs, and the Daytona 500. In addition, she hosted the 1990 Goodwill Games for TBS.

=== NBC Sports ===
In May 1992, Storm left CNN and was hired by NBC. She hosted for the Olympic Games, as well as NBA and WNBA basketball, the National Football League, figure skating and Major League Baseball. Storm became the first woman in American television history to act as solo host of a network's sports package when she hosted NBC Major League Baseball games from 1994 to 2000 (CBS' Andrea Joyce preceded her, but co-hosted the sports packages). She then hosted The NBA on NBC from 1997 to 2002. Storm also anchored NBC Sports coverage of Wimbledon, French Open, Notre Dame football, World Figure Skating Championships, NBC SportsDesk, Men's and Women's U.S. Open (golf) and various college bowl games. Storm was also the first play-by-play announcer for the WNBA in 1997.

=== The Early Show ===
On October 28, 2002, she moved to CBS News and became one of the hosts of The Early Show. As co-host of The Early Show, she covered major news events, including the Iraq War, Hurricane Katrina, Super Bowls XXXVIII and XLI, the 2004 Democratic National Convention, the 2004 and 2008 presidential elections, and the 2005 London terrorist bombings. Storm has interviewed major newsmakers such as Presidents George W. Bush and Barack Obama, First Lady Laura Bush, Secretary of State Condoleezza Rice and Senators John McCain, Hillary Clinton, as well as many sports and pop culture icons, including Elton John, Paul McCartney, Peyton Manning, Tiger Woods, Jamie Foxx, Halle Berry and Jennifer Aniston.

In addition to her duties on The Early Show, Storm hosted shows for the award-winning CBS newsmagazine, 48 Hours. She also served as co-host of the network's CBS Thanksgiving Day Parade for five years. In 2007, Storm conceived and wrote a daily blog for CBSNews.com, which featured behind-the-scenes insight and stories of inspirational women.

During an Early Show on-air segment, Storm revealed on camera that she had a congenital defect known as port-wine stain under her left eye.

In November 2007, CBS announced that Storm was leaving The Early Show. Storm's last day as an Early Show co-host was December 7, 2007.

=== ESPN/ABC ===
Storm joined ESPN on May 10, 2008. She anchored SportsCenter weekdays (except Fridays during the NFL season) from 9 am until noon and on Sunday mornings during the NFL season with Bob Ley. Her duties were to deliver highlights and to question analysts about sports topics.

In August 2009, she added tennis host to her ESPN duties by co-hosting the 2009 U.S. Open with Mike Tirico and Chris Fowler. She also co-hosted the 2010 U.S. Open, 2011 Wimbledon and the 2011 U.S. Open.

In February 2010, fellow ESPN colleague Tony Kornheiser criticized her outfit that day on his radio show, saying that her outfit looked like "a sausage casing", and was suspended from ESPN for two weeks. He later apologized to her via a 15-minute phone conversation. Beginning on April 3, 2010, Storm would host ESPN Sports Saturday, a show on corporate sibling ABC similar to that network's classic sports series, Wide World of Sports.

In June 2010, alongside fellow anchor Stuart Scott, Storm provided pregame coverage for the 2010 NBA Finals between the Boston Celtics and Los Angeles Lakers. She later became host of the NBA Countdown pregame show for the 2010–2011 season, alternating with Stuart Scott, until the 2011–12 NBA season.

When Scott died in 2015, Storm was tasked with announcing the news on SportsCenter. She nearly broke down during the segment. On August 10, 2016, she also announced the death of another colleague, John Saunders, while airing live from Olympics coverage in Rio de Janeiro. On November 11, 2026, she announced the death of her husband, Dan Hicks, on social media.

=== Amazon Prime ===
In 2018, Storm and Andrea Kremer became the first female duo to call an NFL game, which they did for an Amazon Prime stream of Thursday Night Football.

== Personal life ==
On January 8, 1994, Storm married sportscaster Dan Hicks and remained married until Hicks's death in 2026. The couple had three daughters together. Storm is Catholic.

Storm was born with a large port-wine stain birthmark under her left eye which she talks about publicly in order to raise awareness about the condition. In 2008 Storm created the Hannah Storm Foundation, which raises awareness and provides treatment for children suffering from debilitating and disfiguring vascular birthmarks. She also sits on the boards of the Tribeca Film Festival, Colgate Women's Sports Awards, 21st Century Kids 1st Foundation, and has done extensive work with the March of Dimes, Partnership for a Drug-Free America, Boys and Girls Club, Special Olympics, the Women's Sports Foundation, Vascular Birthmark Institute, University of Notre Dame and the Diocese of Bridgeport. Storm also founded Brainstormin' Productions for the creation of educational and inspirational programming. In May 2011, Storm received "Celebrated Mom" award from LifeWorx, Inc., Chappaqua, New York. This award is given to a mother who inspires others, in spite of career and family challenges.

Notre Dame Inspirations funds a journalism scholarship in her name at her alma mater.

Storm has also contributed extensively to several magazines, including Cosmopolitan, Nick Jr., Family Circle, Child and Notre Dame Magazine.

=== Accidental burning ===
On December 11, 2012, Storm sustained second-degree burns to her chest and hands, and first-degree burns to her neck and face resulting from a propane-gas grill accident at her home. Her 15-year-old daughter alerted authorities to the accident. Storm lost her eyebrows, eyelashes and roughly half her hair. After receiving medical care from the Burn Center at Westchester Medical Center in Valhalla, New York, Storm returned to the air January 1, 2013, co-hosting the Rose Parade on ABC while wearing a bandage on her left hand and sporting hair extensions, and returned to SportsCenter on January 13, 2013, to host the Sunday-morning edition with Bob Ley.

== Career timeline ==
- 1989–1992: CNN Sports Tonight Anchor
- 1995, 1997, 1999: World Series Host
- 1997–2002: NBA on NBC Host
- 1997: WNBA on NBC Play-by-Play
- 2002–2007: The Early Show Co-Host
- 2008–present: SportsCenter Anchor
- 2010–2011: NBA Countdown Host
- 2018–present: Amazon Prime Video Thursday Night Football, Play-by-Play
- Received the "Celebrated Mom" Award from LifeWorx, Inc, Chappaqua, NY in May 2011.

== Bibliography ==
- Notre Dame Inspirations: The University's Most Successful Alumni Talk About Life, Spirituality, Football and Everything Else Under the Dome, Doubleday, 2006. ISBN 978-0-385-51812-3
- Go Girl! Raising Healthy Confident and Successful Daughters through Sports, Sourcebooks, 2002 and 2011
