= Nick Charles (sportscaster) =

American journalist and sports broadcaster (1946–2011)

- Born: June 30, 1946; Chicago, Illinois, U.S.
- Died: June 25, 2011 (aged 64); Santa Fe, New Mexico, U.S.
- Education: Columbia College Chicago
- Occupation: Sportscaster
- Years active: 1980–2011
- Spouse: Cory Anne Azumbrado Charles
- Children: 4

Nicholas Charles Nickeas (June 30, 1946 – June 25, 2011), known as Nick Charles, was an American sportscaster and journalist. He was one of CNN's first on-air personalities and won three CableACE Awards for best sports program during his 17-year tenure as co-host of the network's Sports Tonight. He was a graduate of Columbia College Chicago.

== Career in broadcasting ==
Charles started his career as a sportscaster at local television stations. He worked the nightly sports desk at WICS, in Springfield, Illinois, where Fred Hickman his future co-anchor at CNN began his career. He worked at WTOP Radio and WRC-TV in Washington, D.C. as sports director. At WJZ-TV in Baltimore, Maryland, he won an Associated Press award for investigative journalism.

Charles was the first sports anchor for CNN in 1980. He co-hosted CNN Sports Tonight with Fred Hickman, and later hosted his own program, Page One with Nick Charles until leaving the network in 2001. He hosted the Goodwill Games for Turner Broadcasting in 1986 in Moscow, 1990 in Seattle, Washington, 1994 in St. Petersburg, Russia and covered boxing for the Goodwill Games in New York City in 1998.

Beginning in 2001, Charles hosted of Showtime's ShoBox: The New Generation. As a boxing commentator, he interviewed major boxing figures including Muhammad Ali and Evander Holyfield. He also hosted boxing on Versus, a sports network. Nick won the Boxing Writer's Association 2007 Broadcaster award. In 2008, he won the Sam Taub Award for excellence in boxing broadcasting journalism. Charles was also the winner of several cableACE awards.

He was named "sexiest sportscaster" in America several years in a row by U.S. Television Fan Association. Nick Charles and former heavyweight contender George Chuvalo shared the Bill Crawford Award for perseverance in overcoming adversity in 2009 from the Boxing Writer's Association.

It was reported in USA Today that Nick Charles was taking a leave of absence from Showtime in 2009 to battle stage 4 bladder cancer. Boxing and sports websites, including ESPN.com reported on January 16 that Charles was returning to Showtime on January 29, 2010, and had 80% remission. As of March 2010, the cancer became more aggressive and he returned to M.D. Anderson in Houston for a chemotherapy clinical trial. Despite spending most of his career broadcasting fights for Showtime, in March 2011, Charles returned to the airwaves for a final time as a host of HBO's Boxing After Dark program after HBO executives heard of his desire to call one more fight before he died. As documented on the June 19, 2011 edition of CNN's Sanjay Gupta MD he was in the final stages of the disease. He had been recording video messages for his family and friends to show after his death. His close friendship with Mike Tyson was also documented.

Charles was inducted into the International Boxing Hall of Fame in the Observer category as part of the class of 2024.

== Personal life ==
Charles was born in Chicago, Illinois. His mother was of Sicilian heritage, and his father of Spartan Greek. His widow Cory, is a senior director for CNN International's Guest Planning Unit. Mr. Charles had two previous marriages which ended in divorce. Charles had four children: two children from his first marriage; an adopted daughter from his second; and one child during his final marriage. He married Cory in 1997, an international journalist with CNN since 1990 where she has reported, anchored, and is known mostly for her work planning guests for CNN International. She is a cum laude graduate of Long Island University's Brooklyn Campus, which she attended on a four-year NCAA softball scholarship. Mrs. Charles has a master's degree in political science from the University of California, Santa Barbara and has attended UCLA. His wife, like Nick, came from the inner city, and has a passion for travel. The couple was known to have visited some 60 countries around the globe. Nick Charles also had three grandchildren. His son Jason is an entrepreneur, and owns an audio-visual production company in Tempe, Arizona. His daughter, Katie, ran track and field for Kennesaw State University in Kennesaw, Georgia. Katie recently ran in the Boston Marathon. He spoke openly to CNN's Sanjay Gupta and other reporters about his failures in life, and about how he finally got it right in his last marriage. The video diaries he recorded were for his youngest daughter.

=== Cancer ===
In 2009, Charles was diagnosed with metastatic bladder cancer, as documented on the June 19, 2011 edition of CNN's Sanjay Gupta MD. He had been recording video messages for his family and friends to show after his death. CNN reported his death on Saturday, June 25, 2011, at the age of 64. Prior to that, he set up a charity to help children in the Philippines with World Vision.

== Honors ==
2007 Boxing Writers Association of America Sam Taub Award for Excellence in Broadcast Journalism

2009 Boxing Writers Association of America John McCain-Bill Crawford Courage Award

2024 Inducted into the International Boxing Hall of Fame
