= Craig Masback =

American middle-distance runner

Personal information
- Nationality: American
- Born: March 31, 1955 (age 71) White Plains, New York, U.S.
- Spouse: Sarah Masback

Sport
- Sport: Track
- Events: 1500 meters, mile
- College team: Princeton

Achievements and titles
- Personal bests: 800 meters: 1:47.55; 1500 meters: 3:35.28; Mile: 3:52.02; 3000 meters: 7:52.89

Craig Alford Masback (born 31 March 1955) is an American retired middle-distance runner who specialized in the mile and 1500 meters, recording 30 sub-four-minute miles, including a best of 3:52.02, winning the U.S. Indoor Championships at the mile distance in 1980, establishing an American record at 2000 meters in 1982, and representing the United States 10 times in international competition between 1976 and 1985.

After retiring as an athlete, he pursued careers in sports marketing, law, and print and TV journalism. He has covered five Olympic Games for NBC Sports as a color commentator in track and field. He later became a sports official, and CEO of USA Track & Field from 1997 to 2008, where he tripled revenues, quadrupled sponsor revenue, and helped implement programs that substantially increased funds to and services for elite athletes. He was the Senior Director, Global Sports Marketing, NA & Global Running / Track & Field at Nike, Inc. until 2022.

== Early life and education ==
Masback was brought up in White Plains, New York. He graduated from White Plains Senior High School in 1973. He attended Princeton University, where he was co-captain of the track and field team and competed on the cross country team. He was a Magna Cum Laude graduate of the Woodrow Wilson School of Public & International Affairs in 1977 and received Princeton's Harold Willis Dodds Prize, which recognizes the senior who best embodies “qualities of clear thinking, moral courage, a patient and judicious regard for the opinions of others, and a thoroughgoing devotion to the welfare of the university and to the life of the mind.” He also received the William Winston Roper Trophy, awarded to the Princeton “man of high scholastic rank and outstanding qualities of sportsmanship and general proficiency in athletics.” He was awarded an NCAA Postgraduate Scholarship and attended Trinity College, Oxford University from 1977 to 1979 on a Henry Griffth Keasbey Memorial Scholarship. At Oxford, he pursued a graduate degree (M.Litt.) in Politics, but did not receive a degree. In 1994, he earned a J.D. degree from the Yale Law School, where he was a recipient of a Ford Foundation International grant and was an editor of the Yale Law Journal.

== Athletic career ==
In high school, Masback was the New York State Indoor Champion at 600 yards (1973) and won the Eastern States and Golden West Invitational track and field meets at 880 yards (1973). At Princeton, he was the anchor leg on a Two-Mile Relay that won the NCAA Indoor Championships (1975) and finished second in the NCAA Distance Medley Relay indoors (1976). He finished sixth in the NCAA Indoor Championships in the mile run (1977). He was a two-time IC4A Champion and an eight-time Heptagonal (and Ivy League) Champion at various distances (including relays).

He launched a professional running career while at Oxford, improving his personal best mile time from 4:01.8 (1977) to 3:52.02, which when he ran it on July 17, 1979, in Oslo's Bislet Stadium established him as the sixth fastest miler in history. It was one of his 30 sub-four-minute miles. His first sub-four-minute mile was run at the Iffley Road track in Oxford, England, where he was the second man to break four minutes.

Twenty-four years earlier, on the same track, Roger Bannister's legendary run shattered the four-minute barrier for the first time in history. Masback became U.S. Indoor champion in the mile run in 1980.[3] He finished third twice in the 1500 meters at the English Championships, the AAA Championships, in 1978 and 1981. His best 1500 meter time was 3:35.28, recorded in Lausanne, Switzerland in 1982. That same year Masback established an American record of 5:00.11 in the 2000 meters in Bordeaux, France.

Masback represented the United States 10 times in international competition in indoor and outdoor track and field. He won a bronze medal at the 1985 Pacific Conference Games. He also competed at the 1985 IAAF World Cup as a member of a U.S. team that captured the team title.

Masback was a co-founder (with John Smith and Henry Hines) of the Association of Track & Field Athletes (1980), an athlete's union for professional track athletes dedicated toward bringing about “open” era of track and field competition (“Track Athletes Spur Union Activity in Bid for Rights,” NYTimes, July 1, 1980, B14). Masback was also involved in later efforts to unionize track and field athletes, including in 1985.

== Journalism work ==
While competing as a professional athlete, Masback began writing for newspapers and magazines. He published 12 opinion pieces and profiles in the New York Times, as well as articles for the Miami Herald, Sports Illustrated, The Runner Magazine, Ms. Magazine, and Runner’s World Magazine. From 1995 to 1997 he wrote a weekly online column for Runner’s World entitled “Bell Lap.” A partial list of articles includes:

- The First 4-Minute Mile, 25 Years Later, May 6, 1979
- The Reasons Behind Britain's Rise in Track Stature, NY Times, July 27, 1980, Sect. 5 p2
- The Mile Has No Problem Surviving in a Metric Age, NY Times, July 19, 1981, Sect 5 p2
- Olympic Dreams That Got Away, NYTimes, July 29, 1984, Sect. 5 p2
- When Sport Shatters Myths, Everyone Can Win, NYTimes, December 22, 1985, Sect.5 p2
- The Moroccan Paradox, The Runner, August 1986, p28
- Play It Again, Samaranch, The Runner, September 1986, p52
- Cycle of Drug Use Keeps Going Round, NYTimes, August 30, 1987
- Mile Mannered, Runner's World, February 1988, p28
- Siren of Speed, Ms., October 1988, p34
- Uncertain Course for Track & Field, NY Times, January 6, 1991, p8
- A Sports White Paper for Clinton, NY Times, January 24, 1993, p11
- Prefontaine Legacy Enjoys a Long Run, NYTimes, June 4, 1995
- Back in the Race, Sports Illustrated, July 28, 1997, p8
- Memo From The Front, Brand Week, September 18, 2000, p62
- Rogge Can Make His Term as President of the IOC Count, July 22, 2001
- The U.S., rightfully held to a higher standard, continues to be at the forefront of rooting out drug cheats, Los Angeles Times, March 9, 2003 (Point/Counterpoint)

== Sports commentator ==
Masback has been a sports commentator covering track and field, marathon, and triathlon events for NBC, CBS, ESPN, ABC, PBS, TBS, and BET since 1981, including contributing to numerous Emmy Award-winning events. Masback covered middle and long-distance races for NBC at the Rio Olympics, his fifth Olympic Games for NBC (Barcelona, Atlanta, Beijing, London) and continues to commentate for NBC and NBCSN covering high-profile events, including the World Track & Field Championships, Olympic Trials, USA Championships, Boston Marathon, and others.

== Sports marketing/law ==
Masback worked as Director of Marketing & Sales for O’Neil Productions from 1986 to 1987. He was a co-founder, with Charlie Graves, of Inclyne Sports & Television, a sports event, sports marketing, and sports television production company with offices in New York and California. Inclyne produced numerous events and network television shows including the Foot Locker Slam Fest and the Jeep Tri-Prix for ESPN, NBC Sports, and ABC Sports.

Upon graduation from law school in 1994, Masback became an associate at Wilmer, Cutler & Pickering (now WilmerHale) in Washington, D.C., where he practiced primarily communications and sports law for firm clients such as USWest, CapCities/ABC, and the Dallas Cowboys and represented individual athletes in disciplinary matters before the NFL and Olympic sports governing bodies. He published articles concerning regulatory law and the Court of Arbitration for Sport.

- Independence vs. Accountability: Correcting the Structural Defects in the National Endowment for the Arts, Yale Law & Policy Review, Volume 10, Number 1, 1992, p 177–202
- Supercarriers Compete in Global Arena (with William T. Lake), The National Law Journal, April 8, 1996, B7

== Sports administrator ==
International Olympic Committee

Masback worked as the assistant to the curator of the International Olympic Committee (IOC) Museum & Library from 1982 to 1984 in Lausanne, Switzerland.

USA Track and Field

In mid-1997, Masback accepted the job of chief executive officer of USA Track & Field (USATF), the national governing body for track and field, long-distance running, and race walking. Upon accepting the position of USATF CEO, Masback said, "USATF is open to ideas, open for business, and open to change."

Masback tripled the organization's revenues and quadrupled sponsor revenues during his time as USATF CEO. With his leadership, the organization reached new heights in sponsorship, exposure and, most importantly, athletic success. USATF's budget rose from $6.7 million to close to $20 million under Masback. Masback renewed existing deals with Visa, Xerox, UCS, and Nike and signed General Motors and Verizon as sponsors in the 1998 to 2001 time period. From 2002 to 2007, Masback again extended deals with Xerox and Visa and added AT&T, Hershey's, Tyson, 24-Hour Fitness, Bengay, MBNA, and Sobe Sports Systems as sponsors and reached supplier deals with St. Vincent's, Gill, and Ludos Tours. This allowed USATF to pay off a $3.5 million debt that Masback inherited from his predecessor and build a $5 million reserve at the time of his departure.

In 1999, USATF launched the Golden Spike Tour, later known as the VISA Championship Series, ten elite track meets featuring the world's best athletes with coverage on NBC and ESPN and individual event sponsors such as Oracle, Verizon, Tyson, and Home Depot. From 2000 to 2008, the Visa Championship Series events and the Olympic Track & Field Trials featured record crowds and growing TV ratings, including a sell-out of 23,000 spectators a day for eight days at the Olympic Trials in 2000 and 2004, the largest turnouts in the 120+-year history of the Penn Relays (more than 112,000 spectators in 2004), and a 20% increase in TV ratings for the 2004–2005 seasons, which included 14 USATF-owned TV shows.

Masback oversaw the creation of USATF's High Performance Division, which overhauled USATF's relationship with and services for professional athletes and led to substantial increases in U.S. medals won at Olympic Games and World Championships. Many of the High Performance Division initiatives were outgrowths of the previous attempts to unionize track athletes, including Masback's efforts in 1980 and 1985, and provide them with the resources to pursue professional track and field careers.

Working with NASDAQ CEO Bob Greifeld, Masback launched the USATF Foundation in 2002, which generated new programmatic initiatives for elite and youth athletes and created a new source of funding for the sport. Many prominent American business executives became Foundation board members and created a number of innovative programs that support the sport at all levels.

Faced with a series of doping scandals involving high-profile American athletes such as Marion Jones, Masback spearheaded the development of a Zero Tolerance anti-doping policy in 2003. In addition to raising awareness about doping, encouraging whistle-blowers, and seeking to ban athletes with drug positives from the sport, the Zero Tolerance program included a youth-focused “Be A Champion” initiative (later re-branded “Win With Integrity”) which provided elite athletes with a platform to speak with young people about how to achieve their athletic goals without breaking drug or other rules.

Masback helped administer a nationwide search for a new location for the USA Track& Field Hall of Fame, which had closed prior to his arrival at USATF. After a process that included bids from multiple cities, the decision was made to place the Hall of Fame at the NYC Armory, which under the leadership of Norbert Sander raised funds sufficient to create a permanent home for the Hall of Fame, which attracts more than 200,000 visitors per year.

In 2006, working with organizational sponsor Nike, Masback initiated a rebranding exercise that resulted in the creation of a new USATF logo and imaging system still used today.

== Nike ==
Masback joined Nike as the Director of Business Affairs for the Global Sports Marketing division in March 2008. In July 2009, he became Central & Eastern Sports Marketing Director in addition to his Business Affairs responsibilities, based out of Nike's European headquarters in Hilversum, The Netherlands. In the beginning of 2012, he became Nike's Vice President of Sports Marketing for Greater China, Japan & Global Business Affairs. He works in Nike's Beaverton, Oregon world headquarters.

== Personal life ==
Masback is married to Sarah Vogelsberg and they have two children, a daughter, Grace, and a son, Britton. The couple met while practicing law in Washington, D.C.
