= Jim Huber =

American sports journalist (1944–2012)

Jim Huber (August 28, 1944 – January 2, 2012) was an American sports commentator, writer and essayist. He worked as a sports anchor for the former CNN Sports Illustrated before joining Turner Sports in 2000.

Huber was raised in Ocala, Florida. He attended Presbyterian College but graduated from University of Central Florida. He began his career in sports journalism as a sportswriter for The Miami News and The Atlanta Journal. He joined WXIA in Atlanta, before moving to CNN. Huber also served as Public Relations Director for the Atlanta Flames NHL team from 1972 until 1975.

Huber had a long history with the Turner Broadcasting Corporation. He first joined CNN in 1984, where he hosted a sports show called The Sporting Life With Jim Huber. He also contributed to CNN Sports Illustrated, a sister network of CNN, as an anchor and sports announcer. In 2000, Huber became a full-time on-air announcer and commentator for Turner Sports, which allowed him to cover both golf and the National Basketball Association (NBA) in greater depth. During the 1990s, Huber was awarded an Emmy for an essay, "Olympic Park Bombing", which he wrote and delivered in response to the 1996 Centennial Olympic Park bombing during the Atlanta Olympics.

Huber died in Atlanta, Georgia on January 2, 2012 at the age of 67. He had recently been diagnosed with leukemia.
