= Andre Aldridge =

American television personality

Andre Aldridge is an American television personality. He is currently an anchor for NBA TV. Aldridge previously worked at ESPN, where he served as an anchor/reporter.

During his three years at ESPN, Aldridge reported and anchored for various shows on the network, including NBA Tonight, NBA Matchup, and Friday Night Fights. He also served as an anchor and reporter at Prime Sports Television. In that capacity, he reported for the nightly national news program Press Box and covered the "NFL Game of the Week" throughout the 1995 season, including Super Bowl XXX. He also worked for KMPC Radio in Los Angeles from 1993 to 1994, where he reported and produced Rams and UCLA half-time reports. Additionally, from 1992 to 1993, Aldridge produced and reported for KNBC-TV in Los Angeles.

Alridge served as the host of NBA TV's NBA TV Gametime show, a show featuring highlights of the previous day's National Basketball Association games. He also hosted a variety of other shows for NBA TV.
