= Showtime Championship Boxing =

- Genre: Sports, Boxing
- Created by: Showtime
- Country of origin: United States

Production
- Production companies: Showtime/The Movie Channel, Inc. (1986–1988); Showtime Networks (1988–2023)

Original release
- Network: Showtime and CBS Sports
- Release: March 10, 1986 – December 16, 2023

Related
- ShoBox: The New Generation

Showtime Championship Boxing is an American boxing television program that aired on Showtime. Debuting in March 1986, it was broadcast live on the first Saturday of every month. Showtime Championship Boxing, which was very similar to HBO World Championship Boxing, featured Mauro Ranallo on play-by-play, Al Bernstein as the color analyst, Jimmy Lennon (Sr. and Jr.) as ring announcers, and Jim Gray as reporter.

A sister program, ShoBox: The New Generation, has occasionally aired on Friday nights, featuring fights between boxing prospects. Showtime has also occasionally aired limited cards on the CBS broadcast network since 2012, with the telecasts billed as a special edition of Showtime Championship Boxing rather than being billed as a CBS Sports broadcast.

With the announcement in October 2023 that Showtime Sports will be closing at the end of year, any future sports programming on the network will be branded under the CBS Sports branding.

== Notable fights ==
- "Marvelous" Marvin Hagler defeated John "The Beast" Mugabi in an 11th-round knockout on the debut broadcast of Showtime Championship Boxing on March 10, 1986. On the same undercard, Gaby Canizales defeated Richie Sandoval (who subsequently almost died from the blows received in this bout) and Thomas Hearns defeated James Shuler, who died a week after this bout in a motorcycle accident.
- Mike Tyson headlined multiple pay-per-view heavyweight fights, including:
  - Mike Tyson vs. Donovan Ruddock and Mike Tyson vs. Donovan Ruddock II
  - Mike Tyson vs. Peter McNeeley (He's Back), which marked his return after serving three years in prison.
  - Frank Bruno vs. Mike Tyson II and Christy Martin vs. Deirdre Gogarty on the same program.
  - Bruce Seldon vs. Mike Tyson
  - Mike Tyson vs. Evander Holyfield and Evander Holyfield vs. Mike Tyson II, the latter of which ended with Tyson disqualified for biting off part of Holyfield's right ear.
  - Mike Tyson vs. Francois Botha
  - Mike Tyson vs. Andrew Golota
  - Lennox Lewis vs. Mike Tyson (joint collaboration with HBO)
- Evander Holyfield also headlined:
  - Buster Douglas vs. Evander Holyfield
  - Evander Holyfield vs. Michael Moorer II
- Pernell Whitaker vs. Julio César Chávez
- Nigel Benn defended his WBC Super-Middleweight title against Gerald McClellan in a dramatic fight that almost turned tragic by winning on a tenth-round technical knockout at London, England, on February 25, 1995. McClellan subsequently spent two months in a coma due to a massive brain injury and suffered blindness, impaired hearing, and inability to walk. Benn himself suffered from a broken nose and jaw, urinating blood and a shadow of a brain injury.
- Diego Corrales defeated José Luis Castillo for the WBC lightweight title in a 10th-round TKO on May 7, 2005. The fight is almost universally regarded as the best fight of 2005.
- A ShoBox match between Sechew Powell and Cornelius Bundrage on May 6, 2005, featured an extremely rare double knockdown. Both threw simultaneous rights to the chin, although the referee didn't score any single knockdowns, possibly due to the shock of the occurrence.
- A ShoBox match between Allan Green and Jaidon Codrington, on November 4, 2005, was won via a knockout by Green 18 seconds into the bout. It was named the "Knockout of the Year" by The Ring.
- The four fight series of Israel Vázquez and Rafael Márquez. Marquez won the first fight on March 3, 2007, after Vazquez couldn't continue after round 7. Vázquez would knock out Marquez in the sixth round of their second fight on August 4, 2007. This fight won Fight of the Year and Round of the Year (Round 3) honors for 2007 by The Ring. Their 3rd fight was considered to be the most exciting, which took place on March 1, 2008. Vazquez won the fight by split decision, after an incredible twelfth-round which saw Vázquez knock Márquez into the ropes, which prevented Marquez from hitting the canvas, resulting in a critical knockdown in the closing seconds of the fight. This fight was recognized as Fight of the Year for 2008 by Ring magazine as well. Marquez won their fourth fight by a third-round technical knockout.
- Manny Pacquiao vs. Shane Mosley was aired on May 7, 2011.
- As part of the build-up to Amir Khan vs. Carlos Molina on December 15, 2012, Showtime presented a fight between Leo Santa Cruz and Alberto Guevara on the sister CBS broadcast network, in its first boxing telecast since 1997.
- Floyd Mayweather Jr. signed with Showtime in 2013. His fights comprise:
  - Floyd Mayweather Jr. vs. Robert Guerrero
  - Floyd Mayweather Jr. vs. Canelo Álvarez
  - Floyd Mayweather Jr. vs. Marcos Maidana and Floyd Mayweather Jr. vs. Marcos Maidana II
  - Floyd Mayweather Jr. vs. Manny Pacquiao (joint collaboration with HBO)
  - Floyd Mayweather Jr. vs. Andre Berto
  - Floyd Mayweather Jr. vs. Conor McGregor
  - Floyd Mayweather Jr. vs. Logan Paul
- On June 25, 2016, CBS broadcast a WBC welterweight championship fight between Shawn Porter and Keith Thurman, marking the first boxing event broadcast on CBS in primetime since 1978. The telecast, although part of the Premier Boxing Champions arrangement, was produced by Showtime and billed as Showtime Championship Boxing on CBS presented by Premier Boxing Champions. Thurman retained the WBC title via a unanimous decision.
- On March 4, 2017, CBS aired Thurman's WBA/WBC welterweight unification bout against Danny García. Once again, the fight was broadcast in primetime as a Showtime presentation of Premier Boxing Champions. The fight, which Thurman won in a split decision, received a 2.2 Nielsen rating (a 22% gain over Thurman vs. Porter).
- On April 29, 2017, Showtime broadcast the Anthony Joshua vs. Wladimir Klitschko fight from Wembley Stadium in London to unify the WBA (Super), IBF and IBO heavyweight titles. Uniquely, both Showtime and HBO held rights to the fight, but only Showtime held rights to broadcast it live.
- On December 1, 2018, Deontay Wilder vs. Tyson Fury was aired from Los Angeles.
- On January 19, 2019, Manny Pacquiao vs. Adrien Broner was aired from Las Vegas.
- On August 29, 2021 Jake Paul vs. Tyron Woodley, fight held in Cleveland which ultimately Paul won by split decision, later resulted in a rematch.
- On November 6, 2021, Canelo Álvarez vs. Caleb Plant fight held in Las Vegas, when Canelo becomes the first-ever undisputed world super-middleweight champion.
- On December 12, 2021, the Jake Paul vs. Tyron Woodley II, rematch was held in Tampa which Paul ultimately won by a 6th round KO.
- On April 16, 2022, the Errol Spence Jr. vs. Yordenis Ugás fight was held from AT&T Stadium in Arlington, Texas, Which Spence won by a 10th round TKO and became the Unified Welterweight Champion.
- On April 22, 2023, Showtime broadcast the Gervonta Davis vs. Ryan Garcia fight from Las Vegas. Davis ultimately won the match by 7th round KO.
- On July 29, 2023, Showtime PPV broadcast the Errol Spence Jr. vs. Terence Crawford superfight for the undisputed welterweight championship from Las Vegas. Crawford won the match by 9th-round TKO.

== Commentators ==
Brian Custer served as host of the program from 2015–2023. The main broadcast team featured Mauro Ranallo on blow-by-blow, Al Bernstein as chief color analyst and (when he was available) boxer Abner Mares as an analyst. Amir Khan, Austin Trout, and Daniel Jacobs have served as guest analysts. The third role was previously filled by Antonio Tarver, Ferdie Pacheco, Bobby Czyz, and Paulie Malignaggi among others. Veteran Jim Gray served as chief reporter. Steve Farhood was the "unofficial scorer". Previous top commentators include Steve Albert and Gus Johnson.

The New Generation features Barry Tompkins on blow-by-blow, and Raul Marquez and Brian Campbell as the expert analysts.

In 1992, Jimmy Lennon Jr. the son of Jimmy Lennon became the program's regular ring announcer and occasionally HBO World Championship Boxing ring announcer Michael Buffer would sub for Lennon and Lennon would occasionally sub for Buffer on HBO.

== See also ==
- Premier Boxing Champions
