= Boxing on ABC =

Overview of boxing broadcasting by the American TV network

- Also known as: ABC Sports Pro Boxing
- Genre: Professional boxing bouts
- Starring: Don Chevrier; Howard Cosell; Dan Dierdorf; Keith Jackson; Jim Lampley; Al Michaels; Jerry Quarry; Chris Schenkel; Al Trautwig; Alex Wallau
- Country of origin: United States
- Original language: English

Production
- Camera setup: Multi-camera
- Running time: Various
- Production company: ABC Sports

Original release
- Network: ABC
- Release: November 11, 1964 – June 17, 2000

Related
- Wide World of Sports; Boxing on ESPN

Boxing on ABC refers to a series of boxing events that have been televised on the American Broadcasting Company. Many of these events aired under the Wide World of Sports banner which began on April 11, 1964, when challenger Muhammad Ali, then known as Cassius Clay, defeated champion Sonny Liston in the seventh round. ABC's final boxing card occurred on June 17, 2000.

== History ==
=== Tomorrow's Boxing Champions (1949–1950) ===
The first incarnation of boxing telecasts on ABC was Tomorrow's Boxing Champions, which aired on Tuesday nights beginning in January 1949. Originating from Chicago, the program featured young, unranked fighters. Bob Elson did the blow-by-blow commentary. The series concluded in September 1950.

=== Meet the Champ (1952) ===
In January 1952, ABC premiered Meet the Champ, which was a collection of bouts involving members of the armed forces. The program aired on Thursday nights, with Wally Butterfield announcing.

=== Saturday Night Fights (1953–1955) ===
In 1953, Ray Arcel began promoting bouts on ABC. Unfortunately, shortly after arranging the fights for ABC, Arcel ran afoul of organized crime. The matches on ABC competed with other network television fights run by the International Boxing Club (IBC), who were reputed to have underworld ties.

Bill Stern did blow-by-blow commentary when Saturday Night Fights premiered. Come the fall, Jack Gregson took over from Stern.

=== Boxing from Ridgewood Grove and Motor City Boxing (1953) ===
In February 1953, ABC premiered Boxing from Ridgewood Grove. Ridgewood Grove's network television show aired on Tuesdays nights, with Jason Owen as the announcer in the first month and Bob Finnegan taking over until its cancellation in August. In March 1953, ABC brought Motor City Boxing from Detroit. The program would air for three months of Thursdays, with Don Wattrick at the providing commentary.

=== Boxing from Eastern Parkway (1954) ===
In May 1954, Boxing from Eastern Parkway moved from the DuMont Television Network to ABC. Tommy Logran handled the blow-by-blow commentary while occasionally being helped by Bob Finnegan and Fred Sayles. The series ended when ABC failed to renew its contract with the arena after picking up the rights to show fights at the International Boxing Club.

=== The Wednesday Night Fights (1955–1960) ===
After cancellation of Pabst Blue Ribbon Bouts on CBS in 1955, the series was picked up by ABC, renamed The Wednesday Night Fights, and continued until 1960.

Russ Hodges and Jack Drees both stayed with the show when it transferred from CBS. Hodges however, left in October 1955 and Drees was the only regular announcer for the five years it stayed on ABC.

=== Fight of the Week (1960–1963) ===
After NBC-TV's cancellation of The Gillette Cavalcade of Sports in the spring of 1960, ABC took over the prime time boxing program, although it was renamed Fight of the Week. Legendary boxing commentator Don Dunphy did the blow-by-blow description of the bouts, which took place on Saturday beginning in October 1960 and running through September 1963.

From there, the series moved to Friday nights, where it continued until ABC finally canceled prime time boxing after the bout of September 11, 1964, permanently ending 18 years of regularly scheduled prime time boxing on U.S. broadcast network television. One reason for the downturn of televised boxing occurred on Fight of the Week's the March 24, 1962 broadcast, when Emile Griffith defeated Benny "The Kid" Paret for the Welterweight Championship at New York's Madison Square Garden. Paret was carried from the ring unconscious, and died several days later as a result of his injuries that he had sustained in that bout.

=== Wide World of Sports (1964–2000) ===
Prior to the advent of Wide World of Sports, many major heavyweight boxing title matches were televised via "closed-circuit" (this generally meant that you had to go to a movie theater to see it, pay a decent amount of money to get it, and then watch it on a giant screen). Often, Wide World of Sports would show full-length replays of the fights a week or two later; these replays were usually called by Howard Cosell, who became one of the best-known (and possibly most controversial) sportscasters in American television history.

Still rebuilding a winning record after his first professional loss to Joe Frazier, Muhammad Ali faced Ken Norton on March 31, 1973, at the Sports Arena, San Diego, California. The fight was aired live on free TV in the United States via ABC.

Jerry Quarry retired for over two and a half years after his 1975 fight with Ken Norton fight. At around this time, Quarry signed a contract with ABC to be a boxing commentator. Quarry was very popular in this position, drawing the ire of Howard Cosell, who was being pushed out of some commentary work by Quarry. In mid-1977, a return match was being put together which would put Quarry in against a ranked heavyweight. The ranked heavyweight would be Italian Lorenzo Zanon. The match was to be televised on ABC, where Quarry was contracted. But both fighters signed to have the bout televised on CBS. When Quarry, who often negotiated his own fight contracts, signed the bout to CBS, he lost his ABC contract.

In 1976, ABC made a deal with promoter Don King and The Ring magazine to stage a tournament to determine the best fighter from the U.S. in each weight division. The tournament, dubbed the United States Boxing Championships was scheduled to begin on January 16, 1977, with ABC agreeing to finance the tournament with an investment of between $1.5 million and $2 million. Soon however, it determined that King was essentially using the tournament to sign the best fighters to exclusive contracts. To make matters worse, The Ring was falsifying records and inflating rankings as a means of getting a number of fighters into the tournament for King.

Sugar Ray Leonard's bout with Wilfred Benítez on November 30, 1979 marked the first time in the era of big-money sports events that a non-heavyweight fight would be carried as the main event on prime time television.

On November 15, 1984, ABC broadcast 'A Night of Gold', a card from promoter Dan Duva's 'Main Events', featuring no less than four gold medal winners (Mark Breland, Tyrell Biggs, Pernell Whitaker and Meldrick Taylor) from that year's Summer Olympic games, as well as those lagging behind in the runners-up spots.

In 1992, ABC announced plans to counterprogram the Winter Olympics on CBS with boxing, a sport at that point, seldom seen on network television. This particular boxing series was sponsored by Fruit of the Loom. ABC proceeded to forgo the typical $300,000 rights fees of the prior year, and instead, set a $75,000 limit and scheduled three consecutive Saturdays of action.

==== Notable bouts ====
Year	Day	Event
1964	April 11	Challenger Cassius Clay, soon to adopt the Muslim name of Muhammad Ali, knocks out champion Sonny Liston in the seventh round in Miami Beach, Florida. Main article: Sonny Liston vs. Cassius Clay
1964	May 30	U.S. Olympic Boxing Trials.
1965	May 29	The rematch between Muhammad Ali and Sonny Liston from Lewiston, Maine.
1966	April 2	Muhammad Ali defeats George Chuvalo in a 15-round decision to retain his World Heavyweight Championship in Toronto, Ontario, Canada. Main article: Muhammad Ali vs. George Chuvalo
1966	May 21	Muhammad Ali retains his World Heavyweight Championship title with a sixth-round TKO of Henry Cooper in London. Main article: Muhammad Ali vs. Henry Cooper II
1966	September 10	Muhammad Ali defeats Karl Mildenberger in a heavyweight title defense, live from Frankfurt, West Germany with a 12th-round TKO. Main article: Muhammad Ali vs. Karl Mildenberger
1966	November 26	Muhammad Ali defends his world heavyweight title for the sixth time in 1966 on Wide World of Sports against Cleveland Williams. Main article: Muhammad Ali vs. Cleveland Williams
1967	February 11	Muhammad Ali defends his World Heavyweight Championship against Ernie Terrell in Houston, Texas. Main article: Muhammad Ali vs. Ernie Terrell
1967	March 11	Interview with Muhammad Ali and Wilt Chamberlain.
1970	February 21	Joe Frazier knocks out Jimmy Ellis in the fifth round for the vacant World Heavyweight Championship from New York City.
1970	October 31	In Atlanta, Muhammad Ali defeats Jerry Quarry in the third round, in his first fight in three years. Main article: Muhammad Ali vs. Jerry Quarry
1970	November 21	Joe Frazier knocks out Bob Foster in the second round of their World Heavyweight Championship fight in Detroit.
1971	March 13	Analysis of the World Heavyweight Championship fight between Muhammad Ali and Joe Frazier with Muhammad Ali. Main article: Fight of the Century
1972	September 23	Muhammad Ali ends the career of former world heavyweight champion Floyd Patterson with a seventh-round knockout in New York City. Main article: Muhammad Ali vs. Floyd Patterson II
1972	November 25	Muhammad Ali-Bob Foster fight. Main article: Muhammad Ali vs. Bob Foster
1973	January 27	World Heavyweight Championship fight between Joe Frazier and George Foreman from Kingston, Jamaica. Main article: Joe Frazier vs. George Foreman
1973	March 31	Ken Norton wins a 12-round decision against Muhammad Ali in their heavyweight fight from San Diego, California. Main article: Muhammad Ali vs. Ken Norton
1973	September 15	Muhammad Ali wins his rematch with Ken Norton rematch in 12 rounds. Main article: Ken Norton vs. Muhammad Ali II
1974	January 26	Muhammad Ali and Joe Frazier scuffle during the telecast as they watch tape of their first fight in 1971.
1974	March 2	Muhammad Ali defeats Joe Frazier in their second fight in New York City. Main article: Muhammad Ali vs. Joe Frazier II
1974	March 16	Roberto Durán knocks out Esteban De Jesús in the 11th round to retain his World Lightweight championship from Panama City, Panama. Main article: Roberto Durán vs. Esteban de Jesús II
1974	March 31	George Foreman scores a second-round TKO of Ken Norton in a World Heavyweight Championship fight. Main article: George Foreman vs. Ken Norton
1974	September 21	Wide World of Sports returns to Havana, Cuba for the World Boxing Championships, which featured Teófilo Stevenson.
1975	January 5	Muhammad Ali knocks out George Foreman in the eighth round to reclaim the World Heavyweight title from Kinshasa, Zaire. Main article: The Rumble in the Jungle
1975	March 29	Muhammad Ali scores a 15th-round TKO of Chuck Wepner in their World Heavyweight Championship fight. Main article: Muhammad Ali vs. Chuck Wepner
1975	July 26	Coverage of the North American Continental Boxing Championships.
1975	September 13	World Heavyweight Championship fight between Muhammad Ali and Joe Bugner from Kuala Lumpur, Malaysia. Main article: Muhammad Ali vs. Joe Bugner
1976	January 11	Wide World of Sports telecasts tape of Muhammad Ali defeating Joe Frazier in the "Thriller in Manila" heavyweight title fight. Main article: Thrilla in Manila
1976	October 2	Exclusive Sports Illustrated still photographs of the Muhammad Ali-Ken Norton heavyweight fight and interviews with Ken Norton, Joe Frazier and George Foreman.
1977	January 2	Interview with Muhammad Ali.
1977	May 14	Sugar Ray Leonard defeats Willie Rodriguez in the second fight of his professional career.
1978	February 12	USA-Cuba Amateur boxing marks the first live telecast from Cuba since Castro came to power in 1959.
1979	February 4	Alexis Argüello and Alfredo Escalera for the WBC Super Featherweight title. Arguello retained his title with a 13th-round knockout. Main article: Alfredo Escalera vs. Alexis Argüello
1980	July 19	Sugar Ray Leonard and Roberto Durán fight for the WBC Welterweight Championship. Main article: Sugar Ray Leonard vs. Roberto Durán
1980	September 27	In his second bid for the WBA/WBC Middleweight championship, Marvelous Marvin Hagler scores a third-round TKO of Alan Minter in a fight marred by a crowd riot.
1981	September 5	Salvador Sánchez retains his WBC Featherweight Championship with a victory over Wilfredo Gómez. Main article: Salvador Sánchez vs. Wilfredo Gómez
1981	October 17	Sugar Ray Leonard scores a 14th-round TKO of Thomas Hearns in a WBC/WBA Welterweight Championship fight. Main article: Sugar Ray Leonard vs. Thomas Hearns
1982	November 27	Teófilo Stevenson fights Tyrell Biggs from Reno, Nev.
1982	December 11	Rafael Limón loses his WBC Super Featherweight Championship to Bobby Chacon in a 15-round decision, while Wilfredo Gómez retained his WBC Super Bantamweight title against Lupe Pinto. Main article: Rafael Limón vs. Bobby Chacon IV
1984	February 18	The USA-Cuba amateur boxing matches from Reno.
1985	January 5	Live coverage of Mark Breland's second professional fight against Marlon Palmer in Atlantic City, N.J.
1985	January 20	Second professional fights of Pernell Whitaker (vs. Danny Avery), Evander Holyfield (vs. Eric Winbush) and Meldrick Taylor (vs. Dwight Pratchett), live, from Atlantic City.
1985	April 20	The second professional fight of Olympic gold medalist Tyrell Biggs.
1985	June 8	Barry McGuigan defeats Eusebio Pedroza to claim the WBA Welterweight title in London.
1985	September 28	Barry McGuigan defends his WBA Welterweight title against Bernard Taylor in Belfast, Northern Ireland.
1986	February 15	Barry McGuigan defends his WBA Welterweight title against Danilo Cabreira in Dublin, Ireland.
1986	March 29	In a delayed broadcast, "Marvelous" Marvin Hagler knocks out John "The Beast" Mugabi in the 11th-round of their World Middleweight Championship. Main article: Marvin Hagler vs. John Mugabi
1986	July 12	Evander Holyfield wins his first world title with a 15-round decision against Dwight Qawi for the WBA Junior Heavyweight crown live from Atlanta. Main article: Dwight Muhammad Qawi vs. Evander Holyfield
1986	July 26	Mike Tyson destroys Marvis Frazier with a first-round knockout in their live heavyweight fight from Glens Falls, N.Y. In the same show, Barry McGuigan loses his WBA Welterweight crown in a 15-round decision to Steve Cruz in Las Vegas. Main article: Mike Tyson vs. Marvis Frazier
1989	March 4	Virgil Hill-Bobby Czyz fight for the WBA Light Heavyweight Championship in Bismarck, North Dakota.
1989	April 1	Evander Holyfield-Michael Dokes heavyweight fight and a live studio interview with Holyfield. Main article: Michael Dokes vs. Evander Holyfield
1989	June 24	Dennis Andries-Jeff Harding for the WBC Light Heavyweight titles.
1990	March 31	Meldrick Taylor fights Julio César Chávez for the WBC/IBF Junior Welterweight/Super Lightweight titles. Main article: Julio César Chávez vs. Meldrick Taylor
1991	March 2	Riddick Bowe versus Tyrell Biggs. Main article: Riddick Bowe vs. Michael Dokes
1991	June 1	Mike Tyson scores a TKO of Razor Ruddock in a heavyweight fight, taped on March 18. Main article: Mike Tyson vs. Donovan Ruddock
1992	February 1	A special report on Mike Tyson's trial and conviction of rape.
1993	March 6	Riddick Bowe out points Evander Holyfield after 12 rounds of their fight in Las Vegas. Main article: Evander Holyfield vs. Riddick Bowe
1995	July 22	Mike Tyson retrospective: one month before his return to the ring.
1997	April 19	Wide World airs network television's first women's professional boxing match. Former kickboxer Yvonne Trevino wins the WIBF Superflyweight championship live from Las Vegas in a first-round TKO over Brenda Rouse.
2000	June 17	José Luis Castillo upsets Stevie Johnston in the lightweight championship bout in Bell Gardens, California.

- 1980 - October 4: a report on the Muhammad Ali-Larry Holmes bout by Howard Cowell with a phone interview with Muhammad Ali

==== Commentators ====
- Don Chevrier
- Dan Dierdorf – In April 1987, Dierdorf was hired by ABC to join Al Michaels and Frank Gifford on Monday Night Football broadcasts. He spent 12 seasons on Monday Night Football before resigning the post in early 1999. During his affiliation with ABC, Dierdorf also served as a blow-by-blow boxing commentator in 1989, beginning with Meldrick Taylor's first defense of his championship, served as a correspondent for the network's coverage of the 1988 Winter Olympics in Calgary, and called play-by-play of some College Football on ABC games in the early 1990s.
- Keith Jackson – Though best known for his college football broadcasts, Jackson announced numerous other sports for ABC throughout his career, including Major League Baseball, NBA basketball, boxing, auto racing, PGA Tour golf, the USFL, and the Olympic Games. Jackson was a regular part of ABC's popular Wide World of Sports (WWOS), covering both popular sports and obscure events like wrist wrestling. He also handled WWOS' first coverage of boxer Sugar Ray Leonard at the North American Continental Boxing Championships on July 26, 1975, who Jackson called a young boxer to watch.
- Jim Lampley – In 1974, while in graduate school, he was chosen along with Don Tollefson in what ABC called a talent hunt. ABC executives thought that Lampley's youthful looks would make him endearing to the college crowds they looked to attract for their college football games. At ABC, he covered such events as Major League Baseball and college basketball games, the 1986 and 1987 Indianapolis 500, the 1977 Monon Bell game between DePauw University and Wabash College, five Olympics, as well as the program Wide World of Sports.
- Al Michaels – Michaels initially joined ABC as the back-up announcer on Monday Night Baseball in 1976. The following year, he was promoted to the network on a full-time basis. He became the lead announcer, replacing Keith Jackson in 1983. Over the next three decades, Michaels covered a wide variety of sports for ABC, including Major League Baseball, college football, college basketball, ice hockey, track and field events, horse racing, golf, boxing (such as the 1985 Marvin Hagler/Thomas Hearns fight), figure skating, road cycling, and many events of the Olympic Games as well as the Olympic trials.
- Jerry Quarry
- Chris Schenkel – ABC Sports hired Schenkel in 1965, and there he broadcast college football, Major League Baseball, NBA basketball, golf and tennis tournaments, boxing, auto racing, and the Summer and Winter Olympic Games.
- Al Trautwig
- Alex Wallau - He worked primarily on ABC's boxing coverage with announcer Howard Cosell. In 1986, after Cosell's retirement, Wallau became ABC's boxing analyst. He was honored by the Boxing Writers Association of America as the top television boxing journalist in his first year.

===== Howard Cosell =====
Cosell rose to prominence in the early 1960s, covering boxer Muhammad Ali, beginning from the time he fought under his birth name, Cassius Clay. The two seemed to have an affinity despite their different personalities, and complemented each other in broadcasts. Cosell was one of the first sportscasters to refer to the boxer as Muhammad Ali after he changed his name, and supported him when he refused to be inducted into the military. Cosell called most of Ali's fights immediately before and after the boxer returned from his three-year exile in October 1970. Those fights were broadcast on taped delay usually a week after they were transmitted on closed circuit. However, Cosell did not call two of Ali's biggest fights, the Rumble in the Jungle in October 1974 and the first Ali–Joe Frazier bout in March 1971. Promoter Jerry Perenchio selected actor Burt Lancaster, who had never provided color commentary for a fight, to work the bout with longtime announcer Don Dunphy and former light-heavyweight champion Archie Moore. Cosell attended that fight as a spectator only. He would do a voiceover of that bout, when it was shown on ABC a few days before the second Ali-Frazier bout in January 1974.

Perhaps his most famous call took place in the fight between Joe Frazier and George Foreman for the World Heavyweight Championship in Kingston, Jamaica in 1973. When Foreman knocked Frazier to the mat the first of six times, roughly two minutes into the first round, Cosell yelled out:

Down Goes Frazier! Down Goes Frazier! Down Goes Frazier!

His call of Frazier's first trip to the mat became one of the most quoted phrases in American sports broadcasting history. Foreman beat Frazier by a TKO in the second round to win the World Heavyweight Championship.

Cosell provided blow-by-blow commentary for ABC of some of boxing's biggest matches during the 1970s and the early 1980s, including Ken Norton's upset win over Ali in 1973 and Ali's defeat of Leon Spinks in 1978 recapturing the Heavyweight title for the third time. His signature toupee was unceremoniously knocked off in front of live ABC cameras when a scuffle broke out after a broadcast match between Scott LeDoux and Johnny Boudreaux. Cosell quickly retrieved his hairpiece and replaced it. During interviews in studio with Ali, the champion would tease and threaten to remove the hairpiece with Cosell playing along but never allowing it to be touched. On one of these occasions, Ali quipped, "Cosell, you're a phony, and that thing on your head comes from the tail of a pony."

With typical headline generating drama, Cosell abruptly ended his broadcast association with the sport of boxing while providing coverage for ABC for the heavyweight championship bout between Larry Holmes and Randall "Tex" Cobb on November 26, 1982. Halfway through the bout and with Cobb absorbing a beating, Cosell stopped providing anything more than rudimentary comments about round number and the participants punctuated with occasional declarations of disgust during the 15 rounds. He declared shortly after the fight to a national television audience that he had broadcast his last professional boxing match.

In the 1976 Summer Games in Montreal, and the 1984 games in Los Angeles, Cosell was the main voice for boxing. Sugar Ray Leonard won the gold medal in his light welterweight class at Montreal, beginning his meteoric rise to a world professional title a few years later, and Cosell became close to Leonard, during this period, announcing many of his fights.

=== Cancelled 2007 card ===
Seven years after ABC's last boxing card, they were scheduled to broadcast a card from Boardwalk Hall in Atlantic City, New Jersey on April 22, 2007. The card would've featured former light heavyweight champion Antonio Tarver facing off against Elvir Muriqi. Promoter Joe DeGuardia of Star Boxing had been working on the time buy deal (in other words, DeGuardia was not paid a licensing fee by ABC, but rather bought an hour of time from the network). The production would've been handled by ABC's sister company, ESPN with Friday Night Fights commentators Joe Tessitore and Teddy Atlas. The bout was ultimately scrapped amid rumors that Tarver would not be able to make the 175 pound weight limit.

=== Premier Boxing Champions (2015) ===
On March 19, 2015, ESPN announced that Friday Night Fights would air for the final time on May 22, 2015, covering the finals of the 2015 Boxcino tournament. The network announced that it had reached a multi-year deal with Al Haymon's Premier Boxing Champions to broadcast 11 events per-year on the main ESPN network, primarily on Saturday nights, and an afternoon event on ABC. Joe Tessitore and Teddy Atlas were carried over to serve as hosts. ESPN is one of several major broadcasters that airs fights through the promotion, which also includes NBC, CBS, their respective cable sports networks, as well as Spike.

== See also ==
- ABC Wide World of Sports Boxing
- Boxing on the radio
- Olympics on ABC commentators#Summer Olympics
- The Super Fight – Debates subsequently took place over the next three decades as to whether at least one print of film had survived. It was cited that many theaters had continued to play the film long after January 20, 1970, and was also noted that the film had one airing on ABC's Wide World of Sports in 1970, and another on CBS late night in 1977, with many more broadcasts alleged throughout.
