= Olympics on ABC commentators =

American Olympic commentation

The following is a list of commentators that were featured in the American Broadcasting Company's (ABC) television coverage of the Olympic Games from its first Olympic Games, the 1964 Winter Olympics through the 1988 Winter Olympics, its final Olympic telecast to date.

== Hosts ==
=== Winter Olympic Games ===
Year	Prime-Time Host	Daytime Host(s)	Late-Night Host(s)
1964	Jim McKay		
1968	Chris Schenkel; Jim McKay (Note: Jim McKay hosted opening and closing ceremonies only, Chris Schenkel hosted the Olympics.)		
1976	Jim McKay		
1980	Jim McKay		
1984	Jim McKay	Jim Lampley; Kathleen Sullivan	Donna de Varona
1988	Jim McKay; Keith Jackson (Note: Jim McKay hosted Monday to Friday, Keith Jackson hosted weekends.)	Keith Jackson	Frank Gifford; Kathie Lee Gifford

=== Summer Olympic Games ===
Year	Prime-Time Host	Daytime Host(s)	Late-Night Host(s)
1968	Chris Schenkel		
1972	Chris Schenkel		
1976	Jim McKay		
1984	Jim McKay	Frank Gifford; Kathleen Sullivan	Jim Lampley; Donna de Varona

== By event ==
=== Winter Olympics ===
==== 1964 ====
Event	Play-by-play	Color commentator(s)
Skiing	Jim McKay	Andrea Mead Lawrence; Willy Schaeffler
Figure Skating	Dick Button	Carol Heiss
Bobsled		Stan Benham
Ice hockey	Curt Gowdy	
Speed skating	Curt Gowdy	

Jim McKay, Curt Gowdy, and Jim Simpson were the only play-by-play announcers that were utilized by ABC throughout the 1964 Winter Olympics.

Beginning in 1962, Dick Button worked as a figure skating analyst for ABC Sports, which had acquired the rights to the United States Figure Skating Championships as well as the 1962 World Figure Skating Championships. During ABC's coverage of figure skating events in the 1960s, 1970s and 1980s, Button became the sport's best-known analyst, well known for his frank and often caustic appraisal of skaters' performances. He won an Emmy Award in 1981 for Outstanding Sports Personality – Analyst. Although other U.S. television networks aired the Winter Olympics from the 1990s onward, Button still appeared on ABC's broadcasts of the U.S. and World Figure Skating Championships until ABC removed them from its broadcast schedule in 2008.

According to writer and figure skating historian Ellyn Kestnbaum, Button "in effect educated [an] entire generation in how to watch skating", viewers who had never viewed the sport as live spectators before seeing it on television.

==== 1968 ====
Event	Play-by-play	Color commentator(s)
Skiing	Jim McKay	
Figure Skating	Chris Schenkel	Dick Button
Hockey	Curt Gowdy	
Ski Jumping		Art Devlin

==== 1976 ====
Event	Play-by-play	Color commentators
Skiing	Frank Gifford	Bob Beattie; Karl Schranz
Figure Skating	Chris Schenkel	Dick Button
Hockey	Curt Gowdy	Brian Conacher
Bobsled	Curt Gowdy	Paul Lamey
Luge	Jackie Stewart	Paul Lamey
Ski Jumping	Art Devlin	
Speed Skating	Warner Wolf	Anne Henning

Features	Jim Lampley; Pierre Salinger

ABC Sports hired Bob Beattie as a ski-racing commentator, where he was frequently paired with Frank Gifford, a former NFL running back. Beattie's television work included alpine commentary during ABC's coverage of four Winter Olympics in 1976, 1980, 1984, and 1988, and also covered volleyball at the 1984 Summer Olympics. He later worked as ABC's winter sports correspondent, which also involved non-alpine sports, and occasionally worked as an announcer for non-winter sports on ABC's Wide World of Sports program.

==== 1980 ====
Event	Play-by-play	Color commentators
Opening Ceremony	Jim McKay	
Figure Skating	Jim McKay	Dick Button
Speed Skating	Keith Jackson	Sheila Young Ochowitz
Hockey	Al Michaels	Ken Dryden
Skiing	Frank Gifford	Bob Beattie; Susie Patterson
Bobsled	Curt Gowdy; Jackie Stewart	Paul Lamey
Cross Country	Bill Flemming	Peter Graves
Ski Jumping	Chris Schenkel	Art Devlin
Luge	Curt Gowdy	Bill Caterino
Closing Ceremony	Jim McKay	

Features	Jim Lampley; Don Meredith

One of Al Michaels's more famous broadcasts were of the 1980 Winter Olympics ice hockey medal round match between the United States and the Soviet Union, and the attempted third game of the 1989 World Series.

In 1980, an unheralded group of college ice hockey players from the United States won the gold medal at the Olympic Winter Games. The medal round match on February 22—which, contrary to popular belief, did not yet assure the team of the gold medal—was of particular interest, as it was played against a heavily favored professional squad from the Soviet Union, and was in front of an incredibly excited pro-American crowd in Lake Placid, New York. Michaels's memorable broadcast of this game, including his interjection—"Do you believe in miracles? YES!"—as time expired on the 4–3 U.S. victory, earned the game the media nickname of The Miracle on Ice.

Most assume that the game was broadcast live (indeed, CTV, which held Canadian rights to the game, aired it live); but in reality, the game started at 5:05 p.m. Eastern Standard Time and ABC decided against pre-empting local and network news (on the East Coast) to carry the game live. Instead, most of it—including the entire third period—was broadcast within the regularly scheduled, prime-time telecast from 8:30 to 11 p.m. Eastern time (and on a six-and-a-half-hour delay on the West Coast from 8:30 to 11 p.m. Pacific Standard Time). Despite being on tape, the game was one of the highest-rated programs of the 1979–80 television season and remains the most-watched ice hockey game in the history of American television.

Michaels, along with broadcasting partner Ken Dryden, recreated their Olympic commentary in the 2004 movie Miracle. Although Michaels and Dryden recreated the bulk of their commentary for the film, the closing seconds of the game against the Soviet Union used the original ABC Sports commentary from 1980. Gavin O'Connor, the director of Miracle, decided to use the last 10 seconds of Michaels's original "Do you believe in miracles? YES!" call in the film because he felt he couldn't ask him to recreate the emotion he experienced at that moment. Thus they cleaned up the recording to make the transition to the authentic call as seamless as possible.

Immediately before Mike Eruzione's game-winning goal for the US, Dryden expressed his concern that the team was "depending a little bit too much" on goaltender Jim Craig after Craig had just made "too many good saves."

Michaels later recalled, "When I look back, obviously Lake Placid would be the highlight of my career. I can't think of anything that would ever top it. I can't dream up a scenario."

Michaels was only on this particular assignment because he had done one hockey game, eight years prior. The game in question was the gold medal game (the Soviet Union vs. Czechoslovakia) of the 1972 Winter Olympics (on NBC) in Sapporo, Japan. Other announcers on the ABC Sports roster such as Keith Jackson, Frank Gifford, and Howard Cosell had never done a hockey game before. Michaels recalled this during a Real Sports interview in January 2009. Michaels also apparently beat out WABC-AM and New York Islanders commentator George Michael for the assignment.

Two days later, Michaels would broadcast the gold medal game, in which the U.S. defeated Finland, closing the game out by declaring "This impossible dream comes true!"

Al Michaels continued serving as ABC's lead play-by-play announcer for their ice hockey coverage for their next two Winter Olympics, both with Dryden, the lead color commentator. In 1984 from Sarajevo, Mike Eruzione, who was the captain of the gold medal-winning United States ice hockey team from 1980, primarily worked with Don Chevrier. For ABC's final Winter Olympics four years later, Eruzione was this time, paired with Jiggs McDonald.

==== 1984 ====
Event	Play-by-play	Color commentators	Reporters
Bobsled	Tim Brant	John Morgan	
Ski Jumping	Keith Jackson	Jay Rand	
Cross Country	Jack Whitaker	Jack Turner	Diana Nyad
Alpine Skiing	Frank Gifford; Jim Lampley (women's downhill)	Bob Beattie; Cindy Nelson (women's downhill)	
Luge	Sam Posey	Jeff Tucker	
Figure Skating	Al Michaels; Jim Lampley	Peggy Fleming and Dick Button	
Ice Hockey	Al Michaels; Don Chevrier	Ken Dryden; Mike Eruzione	
Speed Skating	Keith Jackson; Don Chevrier (men's 5000)	Eric Heiden	

Features	Hughes Rudd; Ray Gandolf; Jim Lampley; Dick Schaap; Anne Simon; Terre Blair; Barbara Kolonay

==== 1988 ====
Event	Play-by-play	Color commentators	Reporters
Opening Ceremony	Jim McKay	Peter Jennings	
Skiing	Al Trautwig	Bob Beattie	Jack Edwards
Biathlon	Mike Adamle	Keri Swenson	
Bobsled	Lynn Swann	John Morgan	
Cross Country	Mike Adamle	Bill Koch	
Figure Skating	Jim McKay	Dick Button and Peggy Fleming	David Santee and Jack Whitaker
Freestyle	Tim McCarver	Jeff Chumas	
Ice Hockey	Al Michaels; Jiggs McDonald	Ken Dryden; Mike Eruzione	
Luge	Sam Posey	Jeff Tucker	
Nordic Combined	Chris Schenkel	Greg Windsperger	
Nordic Skiing	Mike Adamle	Bill Koch	
Rodeo	Curt Gowdy	Larry Mahan	
Short Track	Keith Jackson	Lydia Stephans	
Ski Jumping	Chris Schenkel	Jeff Hastings	
Speedskating	Gary Bender	Eric Heiden	
Closing Ceremony	Jim McKay	Peter Jennings	

Features	Donna de Varona; Becky Dixon; Jim Hill; Tim McCarver; Jack Whitaker (essayist); Dan Dierdorf; Cheryl Miller

=== Summer Olympics ===
==== 1968 ====
Event	Play-by-play	Color commentators
Opening Ceremony	Jim McKay	Peter Jennings
Track & Field	Jim McKay	Hayes Jones; Parry O'Brien; Jim Beatty
Swimming	Bill Flemming	Murray Rose (men); Donna de Varona (women)
Diving		Ken Sitzberger
Basketball	Bill Flemming	Jack Twyman
Gymnastics	Jim McKay	Tom Maloney
Boxing	Howard Cosell	
Rowing	Bud Palmer	Bill Stowe
Closing Ceremony	Jim McKay	Peter Jennings

==== 1972 ====
Event	Play-by-play	Color commentators
Opening Ceremony	Jim McKay	
Track & Field	Jim McKay	Bill Toomey (400m races); Marty Liquori (150m and 800m races); Erich Segal (marathon)
Swimming	Keith Jackson	Murray Rose (men); Donna de Varona (women)
Diving	Keith Jackson	Ken Sitzberger (men); Ken Sitzberger (women)
Basketball	Frank Gifford; Bill Flemming (filled in for Gifford while he did wrestling)	Bill Russell
Gymnastics	Jim McKay	Gordon Maddux
Boxing	Howard Cosell	
Wrestling	Frank Gifford	
Rowing		Bill Stowe

In 1972, NBC showed the Winter Games from Sapporo, Japan, then ABC returned to carry the Summer Games in Munich, Germany. It was during the Summer Games that Palestinian terrorists attacked the Olympic Village and killed 11 Israeli athletes. Although Chris Schenkel was the actual host of the Games that year, Arledge assigned the story to McKay largely because he was a local news anchor in Baltimore, Maryland prior to joining CBS in 1950 and later ABC in 1961. McKay was joined on set by ABC news correspondent (and former and future evening news anchor) Peter Jennings, and coverage continued for many hours, until the outcome was known. Howard Cosell went with the film crew to get interviews in the village.

After an unsuccessful rescue attempt of the athletes held hostage, at 3:24 AM German Time, McKay came on the air with this statement:

When I was a kid my father used to say "Our greatest hopes and our worst fears are seldom realized." Our worst fears have been realized tonight. They have now said there were 11 hostages; two were killed in their rooms this morn-- yesterday morning, nine were killed at the airport tonight. They're all gone.

— McKay, 1972

McKay later won an Emmy Award for his coverage. He stated in a 2003 HBO documentary about his life and career that he was most proud of a telegram he received from Walter Cronkite the day after the massacre praising his work.

Howard Cosell also played a key role on ABC's coverage of the Palestinian terror group Black September's mass murder of Israeli athletes in Munich at the 1972 Summer Olympics; providing reports directly from the Olympic Village (his image can be seen and voice heard in Steven Spielberg's film about the terror attack).

In the 1976 Summer Games in Montreal, and the 1984 games in Los Angeles, Cosell was the main voice for boxing. Sugar Ray Leonard won the gold medal in his light welterweight class at Montreal, beginning his meteoric rise to a world professional title three years later. Cosell became close to Leonard, during this period, announcing many of his fights.

Keith Jackson was also involved in ABC's coverage of the 1972 Summer Olympics and continued to contribute even when the attack by Palestinian terrorists transformed the coverage from that of a typical sporting event to a greater international and historical news event. In all, he covered a total of 10 Summer and Winter Olympic Games. Jackson covered swimming at the 1972 Summer Olympics and track and field at the 1976 Summer Games. He covered speed-skating during the 1980 Winter Olympics featuring Eric Heiden. He was offered the position of play-by-play for hockey, but turned it down (the position ultimately went to Al Michaels). Jackson called speed skating and ski jumping at the 1984 Winter Olympics. He covered basketball in 1984. He was the weekend afternoon host for ABC's final Olympics in 1988 from Calgary.

Erich Segal was a color commentator for Olympic marathons during telecasts of both the 1972 and 1976 Summer Olympics. His most notable broadcast was in 1972, when he and Jim McKay called Frank Shorter's gold medal-winning performance. After an impostor, West German student Norbert Sudhaus, ran into Olympic Stadium ahead of Shorter, an emotionally upset Segal yelled, "That is an impostor! Get him off the track! This happens in bush league marathons! This doesn't happen in an Olympic marathon! Throw the bum out! Get rid of that guy!" When Shorter appeared to be confused by the events, Segal yelled, "come on, Frank, you won it!" and "Frank, it's a fake, Frank!"

Mark Spitz was originally reluctant to swim the 100-meter freestyle, fearing that he would not win the gold medal. Minutes before the race, he confessed on the pool deck to ABC's Donna de Varona, "I know I say I don't want to swim before every event, but this time I'm serious. If I swim six and win six, I'll be a hero. If I swim seven and win six, I'll be a failure." Spitz won by half a stroke in a world-record time of 51.22 seconds.

==== 1976 ====
Event	Play-by-play	Color commentators
Track & Field	Keith Jackson	O. J. Simpson; Bob Seagren; Brian Oldfield; Marty Liquori (men); Wyomia Tyus (women)
Swimming	Keith Jackson	Mark Spitz (men); Donna de Varona (women)
Diving	Bill Flemming	Ken Sitzberger (men); Micki King (women)
Basketball	Frank Gifford; Curt Gowdy	Bill Russell
Gymnastics	Chris Schenkel	Gordon Maddux (men); Cathy Rigby (women)
Boxing	Howard Cosell	
Wrestling	Frank Gifford	Ken Kraft
Equestrian	Chris Schenkel; Jackie Stewart (Filled in for Schenkel when he covered Gymnastics.)	Bill Steinkraus
Rowing	Frank Gifford	Fritz Hobbs

In the 1976 Summer Games in Montreal, and the 1984 games in Los Angeles, Howard Cosell was the main voice for boxing. Sugar Ray Leonard won the gold medal in his light welterweight class at Montreal, beginning his meteoric rise to a world professional title three years later. Cosell became close to Leonard, during this period, announcing many of his fights.

Features	Pierre Salinger; Jim Lampley; Dave Diles

In 1976, ABC Sports employed Pierre Salinger as a features commentator for the network's coverage of the Olympic Winter Games in Innsbruck, Austria, and the Summer Games in Montreal, Quebec.

==== 1984 ====
Event	Play-by-play	Color commentators	Reporters
Opening Ceremony	Jim McKay	Peter Jennings	Donna de Varona
Track & Field	Al Michaels	O. J. Simpson (men's sprints & relays); Wilma Rudolph (women's sprints); Renaldo Nehemiah (hurdles); Marty Liquori (distance); Dwight Stones (field events); Jane Frederick (filled in for Stones while he competed in the high jump)	Donna de Varona
Swimming	Jim Lampley	Mark Spitz (men); Donna de Varona (women)	Diana Nyad
Synchronized Swimming	Donna de Varona	Esther Williams	
Diving	Jack Whitaker; Bill Flemming (filled in for Whitaker while he did gymnastics)	Cynthia Potter	
Basketball	Keith Jackson	Digger Phelps (men); Ann Meyers (women)	
Volleyball	Bob Beattie	Kurt Kilgore	
Gymnastics	Jack Whitaker	Gordon Maddux; Cathy Rigby-McCoy (women); Kurt Thomas (men)	Anne Simon
Rhythmic Gymnastics	Al Trautwig	Gordon Maddux; Cathy Rigby-McCoy	
Boxing	Howard Cosell		
Water Polo	Tim Brant	Jim Kruse	
Rowing	Curt Gowdy	Steve Gladstone	
Canoeing	Diana Nyad	Jay T. Kearney	
Wrestling	Curt Gowdy	Russ Hellickson	
Cycling (Road)	Al Michaels	Greg LeMond; Eric Heiden	
Cycling (Track)	Bill Flemming	Eric Heiden	
Baseball (demonstration sport)	Don Chevrier	Jim Palmer	
Tennis (demonstration sport)	Arthur Ashe		
Equestrian	Chris Schenkel	Bill Steinkraus; Tad Coffin	
Fencing	Arthur Ashe; Al Trautwig		
Soccer	Mario Machado		
Weightlifting	Lynn Swann	Bruce Wilhelm	
Handball	Al Trautwig		
Field Hockey	Al Trautwig	Mike Eruzione	
Judo	Al Trautwig; Mike Eruzione		
Shooting	Al Trautwig		
Closing Ceremony	Jim McKay	Peter Jennings	Donna de Varona

In 1984, Dwight Stones became the first athlete to both compete and serve as an announcer at the same Olympics.
