= Olympics on CBS commentators =

The following is a list of commentators to be featured in CBS' television broadcasts of the Olympic Games. CBS was the very first television network in the United States to broadcast the Olympics, beginning with the 1960 Winter Games from Squaw Valley, California.

== Hosts ==
Jim McKay was originally tabbed to be the lead broadcaster of the network's coverage of the 1960 Winter Olympics, but had to be replaced by Walter Cronkite after suffering a mental breakdown. McKay recovered in time to host the 1960 Summer Olympics from the CBS Television studio in Grand Central Terminal.

Each Winter Olympics telecast from the 1990s had a different prime time host(s): Paula Zahn and Tim McCarver in 1992, Greg Gumbel in 1994, and Jim Nantz in 1998.

Year	Prime-Time Host	Daytime Host(s)	Late-Night Host(s)	Cable Host(s)
1960 Winter	Walter Cronkite			
1992 Winter	Tim McCarver; Paula Zahn	Greg Gumbel; Jim Nantz	Pat O'Brien	Fred Hickman; Nick Charles (for TNT)
1994 Winter	Greg Gumbel	Jim Nantz	Pat O'Brien	Jim Lampley (for TNT)
1998 Winter	Jim Nantz	Mark McEwen; Jane Robelot	Michele Tafoya; Al Trautwig	Jim Lampley (for TNT)

== By event ==
=== 1960 Winter Olympics ===
Event	Play-by-play	Color commentators
Skiing	Chris Schenkel	Andrea Mead Lawrence; Giancarlo Rossini
Biathlon	Chris Schenkel	
Figure Skating	Dick Button	
Hockey	Bud Palmer	
Ski Jumping	Chris Schenkel	Art Devlin

Features	Harry Reasoner

=== 1992 Winter Olympics ===
Event	Play-by-play	Color commentator(s)	Reporters
Opening Ceremony	Paula Zahn	Tim McCarver	James Brown and Pat O'Brien
Skiing	Tim Ryan	Christin Cooper	Mary Carillo and Cindy Nelson
Freestyle	Greg Lewis	Steven Smalley	
Men's Skiing	Brad Nessler	Hank Kashiwa and Billy Kidd	Jim Gray
Bobsled	Sean McDonough	John Morgan	Lesley Visser
Figure Skating	Verne Lundquist	Scott Hamilton	Tracy Wilson and Katarina Witt
Hockey	Mike Emrick	John Davidson; Mike Eruzione	
Luge	Sean McDonough	John Fee	
Skijumping	Phil Liggett	Jeff Hastings	
Shorttrack Speed Skating	Ken Squier	Pat Maxwell	
Cross Country	Al Trautwig		
Speed Skating	Dick Stockton	Eric Heiden	Michael Barkann

=== 1994 Winter Olympics ===
Event	Play-by-play	Color commentator(s)	Reporter(s)
Skiing	Tim Ryan	Christin Cooper and Andy Mill	
Freestyle	James Brown	Park Smalley	
Nordic Combined	Phil Liggett	Jeff Hastings	
Bobsled	Sean McDonough	John Morgan	Jim Gray
Figure Skating	Verne Lundquist	Scott Hamilton	Tracy Wilson
Ice Hockey	Mike Emrick	John Davidson; Mike Eruzione	
Luge	Sean McDonough	Bonny Warner	Jim Gray
Skijumping	Phil Liggett	Jeff Hastings	
Shorttrack Speed Skating	Ken Squier	Paul Wylie	
Cross Country	Al Trautwig	Paul Robbins	
Biathlon	Al Trautwig	Lyle Nelson	
Speed Skating	Dick Stockton	Eric Heiden	

=== 1998 Winter Olympics ===
Event	Play-by-play	Color commentators	Reporters
Opening Ceremony	Jim Nantz	Andrea Joyce	Al Trautwig, Michele Tafoya, and Lisa Kennedy Montgomery
Skiing	Tim Ryan	Christin Cooper; Hank Kashiwa	Mary Carillo; Ken Read
Freestyle	Ted Robinson	Park Smalley	Lisa Kennedy Montgomery
Bobsled	Gus Johnson	John Morgan	Craig James
Figure Skating	Verne Lundquist	Scott Hamilton	Tracy Wilson
Ice hockey	Sean McDonough	John Davidson	Darren Pang; Ellen Weinberg
Luge	Gus Johnson	Bonny Warner	
Skijumping	Al Trautwig	Jeff Hastings	
Snowboarding	Jim Rippey	Steve Podborski	Lisa Kennedy Montgomery
Shorttrack Speed Skating	Ted Robinson	Randy Bartz	
Cross Country	Al Trautwig	Paul Robbins	
Speed Skating	Gary Thorne	Dan Jansen	
Closing Ceremony	Jim Nantz	Andrea Joyce	Al Trautwig, Michele Tafoya, and Lisa Kennedy Montgomery

Features	Jose Diaz-Balart
