= Robert Pitts =

Robert Pitts may refer to:

- R. C. Pitts (1919–2011), American basketball player
- Robert B. Pitts (1909–1982), HUD regional administrator
- Robert "The Rabbit" Pitts (1979–2024), American car salesman and co-star of the Netflix series Tex Mex Motors

== See also ==
- Robert Pitt (1680–1727), British politician
- Robert Pitt (physician) (1653–1713), English physician
