= Don Wattrick =

American basketball player, coach, broadcaster and executive

Don Wattrick (April 2, 1910 – September 28, 1965) was an American basketball player, coach, broadcaster, and executive who was executive manager of the Detroit Pistons of the National Basketball Association from 1964 to 1965.

== Early life ==
Wattrick was born in Battle Creek, Michigan and attended school in Battle Creek and Lansing, Michigan. He played basketball at Central State and coached at Lansing Central, Chesaning, and Bay City Central high schools before pursuing a career in sports broadcasting.

== Broadcasting ==
Wattrick began his broadcasting career at WKAR while attending Michigan State University. In 1942, he became the sports director at WXYZ in Detroit. While at the station, he called Detroit Red Wings, high school football, and Michigan Wolverines football games. During World War II, he was also a sales and advertising executive with in the Ford Motor Company. In 1946, he joined WJR as host of the Sports Parade and play-by-play announcer for University of Michigan football games. Wattrick returned to WXYZ in 1948 and on October 9, 1948, was part of the first day of broadcasting at WXYZ-TV.

Nationally, Wattrick called Cleveland Browns games for the DuMont Television Network during the 1952 NFL season and provided commentary for ABC's Motor City Boxing, which aired for three months in 1953.

== Detroit Pistons ==
In 1962, Wattrick replaced Bill Flemming as the Detroit Pistons' the radio announcer. In 1964, Pistons owner Fred Zollner promoted Wattrick to general manager. One of his first moves was firing head coach Charley Wolf and replacing him with 24-year old player Dave DeBusschere. The Pistons selected Bill Buntin in the 1965 NBA draft, but Wattrick was unable to sign him to a contract. Before the start of the 1965–66 season, the Pistons lost their leading scorer, Terry Dischinger (military service) and starting center, Reggie Harding (suspension). On September 28, 1965, Wattrick died of a heart attack at his home in Detroit.
