= Wade Hampton High School =

Public high school in Greenville, South Carolina

Location
- 100 Pine Knoll Drive; Greenville, South Carolina 29609; United States; 34°53′10″N 82°21′21″W

Information
- School type: Public high school Public
- Motto: Leading Like Generals
- Established: 1960; 66 years ago
- School district: Greenville County Schools
- Principal: Justin Ludley
- Teaching staff: 108
- Grades: 9–12
- Gender: Coeducational
- Enrollment: 1,770 (2025–2026)
- Student to teacher ratio: 18.38
- Campus type: Suburban
- Colors: Red and gray
- Athletics conference: SCHSL AAAAA Region 2
- Mascot: Generals
- Rival: Eastside Eagles
- Newspaper: Hampton Herald
- Yearbook: Trevilian Yearbook
- Website: greenville.k12.sc.us/whhs/

Wade Hampton High School is a public high school in Greenville, South Carolina, United States. The school primarily serves the communities of Wade Hampton and Taylors, South Carolina.

== History ==
The school was opened in the fall of 1960, consolidating former high schools Paris Mountain and Taylors and some students who formerly attended Greenville Senior High School. As part of a district-wide program to update school facilities, the original buildings were torn down and the new building re-opened in January 2006 on the same site.

== Namesake ==
Wade Hampton High School takes its name from Wade Hampton III who was one of the largest slave owners in the country, and went on to serve in the confederate army and as the governor of South Carolina. He later was elected as a U.S. Senator from the state. His campaign as governor was marked by extensive violence by the Red Shirts, a paramilitary group that served the Democratic Party by disrupting elections and suppressing black and Republican voting in the state. They contributed to the Democrats regaining control of the state government in this period.

The name has garnered mild controversy in the community, but so far there is no real push to get the name changed, despite efforts from students and other members of the community.

== Facilities ==
Wade Hampton High is a 250,000 square foot facility opened in January 2006. Promethean Boards are installed in every classroom and the building features Graphic Arts and CAD Computer Labs, a Media Production lab, and general use labs. In addition, the school has an athletic complex that features lighted tennis courts, a track and field area, and baseball and softball fields. The school's campus is also home to The Fine Arts Center of Greenville.

== Academic Performance ==
Wade Hampton consistently scores higher than both the national and state averages on tests such as the SAT, ACT, and EOC.

== Curriculum ==
=== Core Subjects ===
==== English ====
In South Carolina, 4 English courses are required to be taken to graduate High School. Students are required to take English 2 and the English 2 EOCEP. Wade Hampton High offers many English courses including English 1 CP and Honors, English 2 CP and Honors, English 3 CP and Honors, English 4 CP, AP English Language and Composition, and AP English Literature and Composition. These courses count towards graduation requirements. The English department also includes courses in Creative Writing, Journalism , Film Criticism, and Yearbook Production.

==== Mathematics ====
In South Carolina, 4 Math courses are required to be taken to graduate High School. Students are required to take Algebra 1 and the Algebra 1 EOCEP. Mathematics courses offered at Wade Hampton include Algebra 1 CP and Honors, Geometry CP and Honors, Pre-Calculus CP and Honors, Statistical Modeling, Differential Calculus Honors, AP Calculus AB, AP Calculus BC, and AP Statistics. Also included in the Mathematics Department is AP Computer Science A.

==== Science ====
In South Carolina, 3 Science courses are required to be taken to graduate High School. Biology 1 is required to be taken, as well as the Biology 1 EOCEP. Science courses at Wade Hampton High School are Integrated Science, an introductory course for 9th grade students who need additional support for the literacy demands of Biology, Biology 1 CP and Honors, Chemistry 1 CP and Honors, Chemistry 2 Honors, Anatomy CP, Physics 1 H, Astronomy,AP Biology, AP Chemistry, AP Environmental Science, AP Physics 1, AP Physics 2, AP Physics C: Mechanics, and AP Physics C: Electricity and Magnetism.

==== Social Studies ====
In South Carolina, 3 Social Studies courses are required to be taken. This includes a half-credit of Government and Economics each, a credit of US History, and the US History EOCEP. The Social Studies department at Wade Hampton High includes a wide variety of classes such as Human Geography CP and Honors, AP Human Geography, Modern World History CP and Honors, AP World History: Modern, Civics, Psychology CP, AP Psychology, US History and Constitution CP and Honors, AP US History Preparation Lab, AP US History, Economics and Personal Finance CP and Honors, US Government CP and Honors, AP US Government, and AP Macroeconomics. Economics and Personal Finance CP and Honors classes must be taken with their US Government CP and Honors equivalents due to them being paired graduation requirement classes. AP US History Preparation Lab and AP US History must be taken consecutively.

=== Other Graduation Requirement Classes ===
==== Health ====
As a graduation requirement in South Carolina, students at every High School must complete a class that includes physical activity and a health class. At Wade Hampton High School, this requirement is fulfilled by Physical Education 1 or AFJROTC 1, the first class offered in Wade Hampton High School's Air Force JROTC program.

Computer Science In South Carolina, 1 credit of Computer Science is a graduation requirement. This can be attained through the completion of Fundamentals of Web Design or Advanced Fundamentals of Web Design at Wade Hampton High. Students can also take IT Fundamentals or AP Computer Science Principles online to fulfill this requirement.

==== Foreign Language or Occupational Specialty ====
A foreign language or occupational specialty credit is required to graduate in South Carolina. Foreign Language classes that can be taken to receive this credit at Any class in the Career and Technological Education Department at Wade Hampton High school counts as an occupational specialty credit.

=== Career and Technology Classes ===
Career Technology classes at Wade Hampton High fulfill the World Language or Occupational Specialty requirement for Graduation and are meant to introduce and prepare students to enter certain fields in the workforce. Many of these are grouped into pathways.

Web Design

Three web design courses are offered at Wade Hampton High. Fundamentals of Web Design, Advanced Fundamentals of Web Design, and Fundamentals of Web Design Honors.

== Athletics ==
The 1968 football team finished with a 10–1 record and met the Greenwood High School Emeralds for the first South Carolina state 4A championship, resulting in a loss. The Sandlappers defeated the North Carolina team 21–7. The boys basketball team won state championships in 1970, 1972 and 2011. The boys cross-county team won state championships in 1999, 2000, 2001, 2002, and 2003.

== Success in State and National Organizations ==
Wade Hampton High School's Student Council has held many positions in state and regional/national organizations. Including holding the State Presidency in the South Carolina Association of Student Councils (SCASC) in 2011-2012 and 2019-2020, hosting the South Carolina State Student Council Convention in 2012. The school also held the presidency of the Southern Association of Student Councils (SASC) in 2013 and 2025, hosting the SASC Conference in both years.

== Notable alumni ==
- Jim DeMint – former member U.S. House of Representatives, former U. S. Senator
- Clyde Mayes – 1974 & 1975 Southern Conference Men's Basketball Player of the Year, former NBA basketball player
- John Michael McConnell – retired Vice admiral (United States) Navy, former Director of the National Security Agency
- Jane Robelot – television news personality
- John Piper - is a bible scholar, Baptist theologian, pastor, and chancellor of Bethlehem College & Seminary in Minneapolis, Minnesota.
- Rob Pitts - TV/Internet personality
- Lucas Glover - is an American professional golfer who currently plays on the PGA Tour. He is best known for winning the 2009 U.S. Open.
- Capers Williamson - track and field athlete
