= James Morgan (bobsledder) =

American bobsledder (1948–1981)

- Born: James Patrick Morgan; December 16, 1948
- Died: February 8, 1981 (aged 32); Cortina d'Ampezzo, Italy
- Cause of death: Bobsled accident
- Resting place: St. Bernard's Cemetery; Saranac Lake, New York
- Other names: Jimmy, Nitro
- Occupation: Automobile salesman
- Known for: Bobsled driver, 1976 Winter Olympics

James Patrick Morgan, known as Jimmy, but nicknamed "Nitro" (December 16, 1948 - February 8, 1981) was an American bobsled driver who competed from the mid-1970s to the early 1980s. He was killed in 1981 during the third of four runs of the four-man event at the World Championships in Cortina d'Ampezzo, Italy, held at the track used for the 1956 Winter Olympics.

Morgan's death at age 32, coupled with the fatality of a stuntman involved in the production of the 1981 film For Your Eyes Only the following week, led to the shortening of the Cortina track.

A native of Saranac Lake, New York, Morgan competed in the 1976 Winter Olympics at Innsbruck, Austria, finishing fourteenth in the two-man event and fifteenth in the four-man event at Igls.

Morgan's brother John (b.1950) was also a bobsledder who has served as a television color commentator for the sport since 1981. He was calling the competition for ABC with Bill Flemming when James' accident occurred.
