= John Morgan (sportscaster) =

American sportscaster (born 1950)

John F. Morgan (born December 10, 1950) is an American broadcaster and television producer from Saranac Lake, New York. He has been the American network Winter Olympics bobsled commentator since 1984.

== Biography ==
=== Athletic career ===
Before becoming involved in broadcasting, Morgan played rugby union and was a bobsled racer. A member of a prominent bobsled racing family, Morgan's father and brothers were all involved in the sport, and his brother, 1976 Olympian James "Nitro" Morgan, died in a bobsled accident in Cortina d'Ampezzo, Italy.

Morgan was on the U.S. National team from 1978-1979, but did not qualify for the 1980 Winter Olympics. After he failed to qualify, he landed a job with ABC Sports.

=== Broadcasting career ===
Morgan has been the American network's bobsled commentator at the Winter Olympic Games, starting with ABC in 1984 and 1988, then with CBS in 1992, 1994 and 1998, and with NBC in 2002, 2006, 2010, 2014, 2018, 2022, and 2026. His broadcasting career began with ABC at the 1981 FIBT World Championships in Cortina d'Ampezzo, Italy, where he called the race that took his brother's life. He reported discussing the crash on air and then leaving the commentary booth to find his brother pulseless at the site of the crash.

From 2002 to 2007, he was a broadcaster for bobsled and skeleton World Cup races on Speed Channel, working with Tim Singer. For 2007-08, the World Cup competitions could be seen online at NBC Sports' website and live on Canadian television.

=== Movie appearances ===
Morgan has a cameo appearance in the 1993 Disney film Cool Runnings, a movie about the Jamaican bobsled team. In the film he plays opposite NBC Sports commentator Al Trautwig.

=== Television producer ===
Morgan founded JFM Sports, Inc. in 1982. The company created a TV series in 1989 called Rugby World, and bought the rights to the Hong Kong 7's and other Rugby properties. This 12-week series started on Prime Network and moved to espn2 when it launched in 1995. JFM also created the American Patriots, a USA Rugby League Team that competed at the Sydney 7's. Morgan also created a USA-Ireland match that was staged at RFK Stadium in Washington, DC and televised live on ESPN in 1995. JFM also created Winter Speed, a 10-week series started in 1990 that featured bobsled, luge and skeleton events, and aired on Prime. In 1995 the FIBT hired JFM to coordinate its coverage of international bobsled and skeleton.

JFM continues to produce bobsled and skeleton World Cup races, which are shown on NBC/Universal Sports in the United States, Sportsnet in Canada, and in most major markets worldwide. In 2002, he was named an honorary member of the FIBT.
