= Boxing from Ridgewood Grove =

- Genre: Sports
- Presented by: Jason Owen (February 1953-March 1953); Bob Finnegan (March 1953-August 1953)
- Country of origin: United States
- Original language: English

Production
- Running time: 90 minutes

Original release
- Network: WABC-TV, 7
- Release: February 1953 – August 1953

Boxing from Ridgewood Grove is an American sports program broadcast by the American Broadcasting Company from February 1953 to August 1953. The program aired boxing matches from Ridgewood Grove Arena in Queens, New York. The program aired Tuesday nights at 9 pm ET and was 90 minutes long.

== History ==
Boxing from Ridgewood Grove began airing on Tuesdays in February 1953, following the American Broadcasting Co.'s expansion of network boxing coverage. By then, televised fight promotions were already broadcasting on Monday, Wednesday, Friday, and Saturday nights. A resolution had previously restricted network boxing coverage to four nights weekly. Brooklyn's Eastern Parkway Arena aired on Mondays via DuMont, the International Boxing Club held CBS's Wednesday and NBC's Friday slots, Detroit's Motor City Arena had Thursdays on ABC, and Saturdays rotated among cities on the ABC network.

On February 17, 1953, a fifth network attempt began at Ridgewood Grove Arena, directed by veteran manager Tex Sullivan. ABC broadcast the fights locally in New York and was looking to expand nationwide with additional sponsors and markets. Sullivan's Tuesday night TV network show aired on just two stations, with ABC paying main event fighters a minimum of $1,500 each.

With the addition of Ridgewood Grove, boxing had become a network TV staple, airing five nights a week: Monday, Tuesday, Wednesday, Friday, and Saturday. Ridgewood Grove cards were televised by WABC-TV channel 7 starting at 9:00 pm, with only some parts of the country receiving the telecast.

The first month featured Jason Owen as announcer, followed by sportscaster Bob Finnegan, who hosted the program until its cancellation.

ABC Television, which had only aired two half-hour shows on Tuesday nights, added 90 minutes of Ridgewood Grove boxing in March, opening with former welterweight champion Johnny Bratton vs. Al "Sugar" Wilson over a limited network.

A match between Joey Giambra and Otis Graham was televised regionally in the East on March 10, 1953. On March 30, undefeated Johnny Saxton of Brooklyn faced Charley Williams in a bout televised by ABC to a few cities. Saxton's unbeaten streak was brought to 40 consecutive wins.

Other televised main events included Bill Bossio vs. Miguel Berrio, George Dunn vs. Arthur Persley, and Gerry Dreyer vs. Vic Cardell.

The Coronation of Elizabeth II on June 2, 1953, prompted the cancellation of a Tuesday night fight telecast due to its extensive network coverage.

The American television series aired on the network until August 1953.

== See also ==
- Boxing on ABC
- 1953-54 United States network television schedule
