= Jane Robelot =

American journalist

Jane Robelot (born October 9, 1960) is an American television host, who served as a co-anchor of CBS television's This Morning from 1996 to 1999. In the 1980s, she worked at WSPA-TV in Spartanburg, South Carolina, then at then-CBS-owned WCAU TV Philadelphia before moving to CBS. After working for CBS News, she was the primary anchor for WGCL-TV in Atlanta. A native of Greenville, South Carolina, where she graduated from Wade Hampton High School (Greenville, South Carolina), and a graduate of Clemson University, she is currently the 4pm news anchor at WYFF-TV in Greenville, South Carolina. She is married and has one son.

During her tenure at CBS, she won two national Emmy Awards. She also served as daytime co-host of the Nagano Olympics with Mark McEwen.

Since returning to South Carolina, Robelot and her husband Mario DeCarvalho created Carolina Zoom Productions, a high-definition video company.

At WYFF, Robelot worked on "Chronicle: Pauls' Gift" that dealt with a local man's sudden death and his role in saving three strangers. This was done with cooperation of the Greenville Hospital System and LifePoint, South Carolina's organ and tissue recovery agency. A TV special was planned along with public service announcements. The result was an increase in registrations for organ donations in the state along with national and international recognition. Robelot received a George Foster Peabody Award because of her efforts.

Robelot was inducted into the Greenville County, SC Schools Hall of Fame in their 2017 Inaugural Class.
