= Mark McEwen =

American television and radio personality (born 1954)

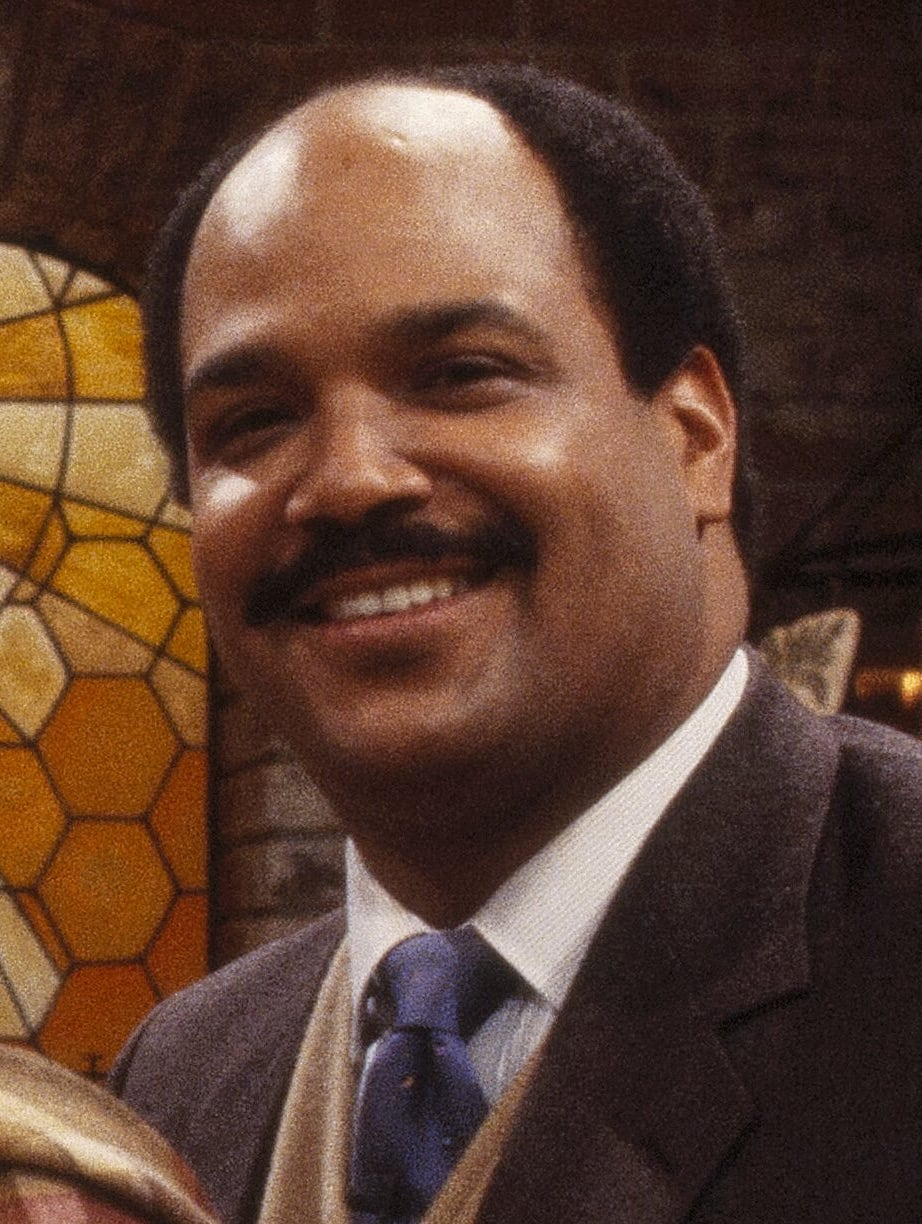
- McEwen in 1987
- Born: September 16, 1954 (age 71); San Antonio, Texas, U.S.
- Education: University of Maryland
- Occupations: TV and radio personality
- Spouse: Denise McEwen

Mark McEwen (born September 16, 1954) is an American retired television and radio personality. He is best known for being on the CBS network morning show for 16 years. He is also known for his work as the host of A&E's Live by Request.

== Early life ==
McEwen was born in San Antonio, Texas. His father, Alfred, was a colonel in the Air Force, and when he was reassigned to Berlin, he and his family moved there when Mark was in the third grade. Three years later, the McEwen family moved again, this time to Montgomery, Alabama, finally ending up in Crownsville, Maryland. His mother, Dolores, after raising six children, retired as a bank vice president. He attended Arundel High School in Gambrills, Maryland and then the University of Maryland, leaving there after three and a half years. While at Maryland, he worked on the college radio station WMUC. After his college years, McEwen moved to Detroit where he landed a job as a rock-and-roll DJ at WWWW-Detroit's W4. He worked at WLUP-The Loop in Chicago following this, where he enrolled at Second City and began to do standup comedy.

== Career ==
McEwen continued his radio career in New York City, working at WAPP during 1983 (partnered on-air with E.J. Crummey) and at WNEW-FM during 1984-86 (partnered on-air with Richard Neer).

McEwen worked for CBS starting in 1987 with The Morning Program and later CBS This Morning, which replaced the former program. In addition to doing the weather, he was the entertainment reporter as well. McEwen covered 16 Oscars, Grammys, Golden Globes and Country Music Association awards shows. He was awarded the CMA Media Achievement Award in 1992 and was named one of the country's "Ten Most Trusted TV News Personalities" in a TV Guide survey in February 1995. From 1996 to 1998, McEwen made two guest appearances on Space Ghost Coast to Coast, the first was just a snippet of his interview that would be expanded upon his second appearance. He contributed to the network's coverage of the 1992 Winter Olympics in Albertville, France, and the 1994 Winter Olympics in Lillehammer, Norway, and co-hosted (with Jane Robelot) daytime coverage of the 1998 Winter Olympics in Nagano, Japan, where he also ran with the Olympic Torch. McEwen was a correspondent on 48 Hours. He then performed a number of on-air roles for The Early Show on CBS from 1999 to 2002. He anchored the broadcast for two years. McEwen has interviewed five presidents: Bill Clinton, George H. W. Bush, Jimmy Carter, Gerald Ford and Richard Nixon. McEwen left CBS in October 2002 as The Early Show was completely revamped.

In 2004, McEwen joined WKMG-TV, the CBS affiliate in Orlando, where he became the morning co-anchor and noon anchor for what was then known as Local 6 News. However, in 2005, McEwen suffered a stroke that ended his stint as a news anchor for WKMG. McEwen had to learn to walk and talk again after the stroke, and the former right-hander now uses his left hand for most tasks. McEwen worked for WKMG as part of its Good Neighbor 6 community outreach program, doing stroke awareness commercials for the station, among other things. In 2008, he published a book about his health challenges entitled Change in the Weather: Life after Stroke. McEwen was named a Stroke Ambassador in 2009 by the American Stroke Association for his "advocacy, leadership, achievement and philanthropy."

McEwen returned to The Early Show on September 11, 2010, doing the weather for the absent Lonnie Quinn for the weekend edition.

McEwen was the host for the First annual RAISE (Raising Awareness in Stroke Excellence) awards for the National Stroke Association in 2011. He also hosted the second awards in 2012.

McEwen hosted, produced and wrote McEwen's Mark, a television interview show, in 2012. In 2014, he returned to WKMG-TV to host Positive Mark, which spotlighted good news and inspirational news in Central Florida. In 2016, he gave a TED Talk. He also wrote a blog at iammarkmcewen.blogspot.com and had a website, markmcewen.com for a while. McEwen now gives motivational speeches around the country. He later hosted All Things Men on the Black News Channel and became a substitute teacher at Hagerty High School in Oviedo, Florida.

== Personal life ==
McEwen currently resides in Florida with his twins Miles and Griffin. His daughter Maya graduated from the University of Oregon. His stepdaughter, Jenna, graduated from the University of Central Florida with a degree in journalism. His brother, Kirk McEwen, is on 98 Rock-WIYY in Baltimore.
