= Nathan Pitts =

American diplomat (1913–1998)

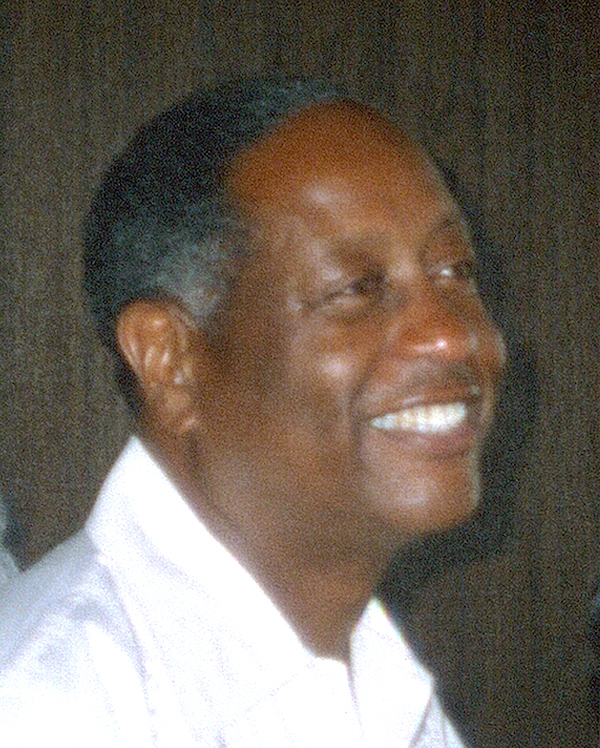
- Dr. Nathan A. Pitts
- Born: June 29, 1913; Macon, Georgia
- Died: June 15, 1998; Baltimore, Maryland
- Occupation: United States Office of Education: United Nations Education, Scientific and Cultural Organization

Nathan Alvin Pitts (June 29, 1913 – June 15, 1998) was an African-American federal administrator, diplomat, and philanthropist. Pitts retired from the Department of Education in 1980 as chief of the division of international education. He was the first African-American to serve as education attaché to the permanent US UNESCO delegation, serving from 1970 to 1975.

== Early years ==
Nathan Pitts, born on June 29, 1913, was the youngest of the four sons of Willis N. and Roberta J. Pitts. His brothers were Willis N. Pitts Jr., Robert B. Pitts, and Raymond J. Pitts.

Pitts attended Florida A&M University and Xavier University on football and basketball scholarships, and earned a BS from Xavier in 1936. In the 1935-36 school year, he earned honorable mention as an All-American quarterback for Xavier. His mentor was Theodore A. (Ted) Wright, the college's football coach. After graduating, Wright helped Pitts find a job coaching and teaching at Immaculata High School in Birmingham, Alabama, where he brought both track and basketball teams to regional medals and best records in a single year.

== Career ==
Later, Wright paved the way for Pitts to serve as principal and primary instructor of the Cardinal Gibbons Institute in St. Mary's County, Maryland, from 1938 to 1944. Pitts' wife Mary Williams Pitts, who he met when they were both students at Florida A&M, served at the same school as the home economics instructor. The school was a Catholic mission under the oversight of Father Horace McKenna, the renowned activist priest who later founded So Others Might Eat, and other D.C.-based charities.

While at Cardinal Gibbons, Pitts and McKenna were active in advocating for social change via local credit unions and cooperatives among the local African-American fishermen and farmers. This gave Pitts the subject for his master's and PhD degrees from Catholic University in Washington, D.C.: the cooperative movement in rural black communities. The Harry Sylvester novel Dearly Beloved is loosely based on the activities of Father McKenna and Dr. Pitts in St. Mary's County during this period.

Before joining the federal government's Office of Education in 1961, Pitts was head of the social science department of Coppin State Teachers College in Baltimore, Maryland. He previously served on the faculty of, consecutively, North Carolina College for Negros (now North Carolina Central University) in Durham, North Carolina; Shaw University in Raleigh, North Carolina; and South Carolina State College in Orangeburg, South Carolina. While Nathan was at Shaw, one of his students was Angie Brooks, who later became a Liberian diplomat and was the first (and, to date, only) African female elected president of the United Nations General Assembly. The two would meet again in 1970 while simultaneously serving their countries as diplomats with the United Nations.

On a leave of absence from Coppin State in 1957–1959, Pitts went on assignment to Tehran and the Azerbaijan Province of Iran with the State Department's International Cooperation Administration (ICA). Upon returning to the US, he resigned this teaching position and went to work for the US Office of Education's education division, where he became the chief of international organizations recruitment. He was responsible for education's participation in the ICA program, and was education's liaison with the Department of State. While in this role, he established the position of full-time Office of Education position in the US Delegation to UNESCO. Then in 1970, Pitts had the opportunity to assume this position on the US Delegation to UNESCO, which he held until 1975. Returning to D.C. in 1975, he became chief of the International Exchange Branch, a title he held until he retired in 1980.

== Retirement and recognition ==
In retirement, Pitts became an education reform activist in northwest Baltimore, Maryland. He died in Baltimore, Maryland, on June 15, 1998, and Baltimore's Dr. Nathan A. Pitts-Ashburton Elementary/Middle School was named, posthumously, to honor his active role in advocating for and securing inner-city educational improvements.
