= Boxing on the radio =

Gillette Cavalcade of Sports aired at 10 p.m. ET on Fridays from 1942 to 1960, most frequently from Madison Square Garden. The networks were Mutual (1942–45), ABC (1945–53), and NBC (1953–60). Don Dunphy did blow-by-blow, with Bill Corum (1942–53) and Win Elliott (1953-60)

Blue Ribbon Bouts aired on Wednesdays at 10 p.m., from arenas all over the country. They were first on CBS Radio starting in 1950, switching to ABC in 1955. Russ Hodges and Jack Drees were the original announcers. When Hodges had baseball conflicts, Drees and Steve Ellis handled the broadcasts. Hodges moved to TV in 1951, and Jack Drees and/or Steve Ellis did the blow-by-blow every week until mid-1953. There was network TV, but not radio the next two years. Radio returned to ABC in 1955 with Ellis doing all the bouts through 1957 (Jack Quinlan subbed on November 28, 1956).

== Networks ==
Network	Day	Blow-by-blow	Color commentator(s)	Years	Notes
ABC	Wednesdays	Russ Hodges	Jack Drees and Steve Ellis	1945-53; 1955–57	
ABS	Mondays	Sam Taub	Joe Cummiskey	1945-56	The bouts were broadcast from Cleveland or Philadelphia.
CBS	Wednesdays	Russ Hodges	Jack Drees	1950-1954	
NBC	Fridays	Don Dunphy	Win Elliott	1953-60	
Mutual	Mondays	Marty Glickman (1956–57)	Bill Corum (1942–45); Art Gleeson (1956–57)	1942-45; 1956–57	Bouts from 1956 to 1957 were broadcast from St. Nicholas Arena in New York.

=== Locally ===
Locally in New York, boxing was a regular feature on WHN 1050, and to a lesser extent WMCA 570 from the 1930s through 1942, and on WMCA and until early 1949 on 1050. WMCA announcers included Sam Taub in the 1930s and the team of Joe O'Brien and Jimmy Power from 1940 to 1942. WHN/WMGM's blow-by-blow announcers included Don Dunphy, Sam Taub, Steve Ellis, Charley Vackner and Guy LeBow.

WINS had a Wednesday night series from Queensboro Arena in the summer of 1945, with Tedd Lawrence and Joe Tobin on commentary. They also did radio broadcasts of the televised Monday night bouts from Eastern Parkway Arena, starting in the spring of 1954. Les Keiter did these bouts from August thru October of that year, when the series ended.

WMGM added a Monday night series from St. Nicholas Arena, in competition with the WINS series. Ward Wilson and Jim Gordon were the announcers. After that, the only boxing radio in New York was the ABC and NBC network weekly bouts. In other words, from there on, only national broadcasts of mostly championship fights were on NY radio.
