= Ridgewood Grove Arena =

Former arena in Queens, New York

- "Cradle of the Champions"
- Interactive map of Ridgewood Grove Arena
- Address: 341-343 St. Nicholas Avenue; Queens, New York; United States
- Coordinates: 40°42′03″N 73°54′34″W
- Operator: Ridgewood Grove Sporting Club, Inc.
- Capacity: 4,000-5,000
- Type: Boxing arena; Wrestling arena; Basketball arena

Construction
- Opened: 1926
- Closed: 1956
- Architect: Starrett & van Vleck

Ridgewood Grove Arena, formerly known as Ridgewood Grove Sporting Club, was an arena located in Queens, New York, United States. It opened in 1926 and had a seating capacity of 4,000-5,000 for professional sports including boxing, wrestling, and basketball.

== History ==
Incorporated on October 10, 1920 after the Walker Law legalized boxing in New York, the Ridgewood Grove Sporting Club Inc. was established by John H. Gerken, George Emerer, and Clinton P. Hamilton. The company was created to manage theatres and boxing arenas. Boxing promoter John Weismantel was hired to act in an advisory capacity for its boxing shows. An early figure in New York's boxing scene, Weismantel had run the Broadway Sporting Club and later opened the Brooklyn Ice Palace as a boxing club in 1921.

Prior to its establishment, the site was operated as a large bar before prohibition. The Ridgewood Grove Sporting Club was granted a license by the New York State Boxing Commission on November 11, 1920 to conduct bouts. The Brooklyn boxing club hosted professional boxing from its original location at Cypress Avenue and Centre St. until the mid-1920s.

In the 1920s, the venue's matchmaker was boxing manager Clarence Gillespie, formerly of the Police Gazette. Following a visit to Gillespie in January 1926, American sportswriter Damon Runyon wrote of Ridgewood Grove: "The roof of the Ridgewood Grove is low hung. The spectators are on slopping seats that run clear up among the rafters. The floor seats are wooden benches. It is not a large place, so everybody is right together in neighborly fashion."

By February 1926, plans were underway to build a modern 4,000-seat "sports and dancing arena". The corporation, represented by attorney I.T. Flatto, purchased a plot across from the old venue to construct a brick and concrete building with a balcony. The "new" Ridgewood Grove Arena was situated on the corner of Palmetto Street and St. Nicholas Avenue in Ridgewood, Queens, near the border of Brooklyn. Covering about 19 lots, the plot stretched 100 feet from Cypress Avenue, 325 feet on Palmetto Street, and included a 50x100-foot gore leading to St. Nicholas Avenue. Formerly the terminal of the Brooklyn Rapid Transit Company, the land was owned by the Brooklyn–Manhattan Transit Corporation, functioning as an approach to the elevated tracks before its extension to Fresh Pond station. Access to the arena's auditorium was provided via a main entrance on St. Nicholas Avenue and a side entrance on Palmetto Street. The site was viewed as a better location, directly beneath the Myrtle–Wyckoff Avenues station on the BMT Myrtle Avenue Line and close to several surface car lines.

Construction of the new arena began in spring of 1926. The structure was 100 feet by 200 feet and built on a design by the architectural firm Starrett & van Vleck. Approximately $100,000 to erect, it housed trainining quarters, shower rooms, and dressing rooms for basketball and hockey teams. In terms of size, only Tex Rickards' Madison Square Garden was larger than the new arena.

The building officially opened to the public on November 6, 1926. While the old Ridgewood arena had been used exclusively for boxing, the new facility was intended to serve as a community hub, accommodating basketball, wrestling, track sports, dances, smokers, lodge gatherings, bazaars, and other events in Ridgewood. During the winter months, the owners intended to add hockey and ice skating to the arena's programming, contingent on securing a franchise.

=== Boxing ===
Jack Clifford took over as matchmaker for the weekly Saturday night boxing cards from Clarence Gillespie at the beginning of the 1926 season. Among its main draws at the time was bantamweight Tony Canzoneri, who fought twice in March 1926.

Clifford's opening card of the "new" Ridgewood Grove Sporting Club took place on November 6, 1926. The main bout featured English featherweight champion Johnny Brown against "Wyoming Cowboy" Eddie Anderson. The co-main event was undefeated Tony Canzoneri vs. Davey Abad, South American flyweight and bantamweight champion. Clifford staged a card with European lightweight champion Fred Bretonnel later that month. Eddie Roberts emerged as a crowd favorite, with four bouts at the venue in November 1926 alone.

In the 1930s, Young Peter Jackson fought frequently in the arena's six-round feature events. From 1933 to 1934, boxers like world's featherweight champion Freddie Miller and German heavyweight Walter Neusel made appearances or campaigned at the boxing club. Johnny Attell, who ran shows at Ridgewood, managed Al "Bummy" Davis and gave him his pro debut at the venue in the late 1930s.

James J. Corbett, ex-world heavyweight champion, organized a December 16, 1930 benefit at the Grove for the Queens relief fund. The all-star card featured world champions Tony Canzoneri and Bat Battalino, title challenger Kid Chocolate, and heavyweight contender Max Baer.

Sporting events were soon first televised via NBC's experimental station, W2XBS. Ridgewood Grove Arena hosted the first televised indoor boxing match on November 3, 1939, produced by NBC. Radio broadcaster Sam Taub did the sports commentary for some of the early telecasts from the arena.

In 1942, promoter Marty Cohen operated the venues of St. Nicholas Arena and Ridgewood Grove.

Cards at the Grove in the 1940s included appearances by Sugar Ray Robinson, Willie Pep, Rocky Graziano, and Sandy Saddler. Graziano, who later became the world's middleweight champion, fought Leon Anthony on March 4, 1944 at the Ridgewood Grove Arena.

The Ridgewood Grove once housed the Golden Gloves championship bouts for the Brooklyn, Queens, and Long Island district. In 1947, the semi-finals of the amateur boxing tournament received coverage by the tele-mobile unit from DuMont-owned WABD (now WNYW). Coley Wallace secured a controversial win over Rocky Marciano in the Golden Gloves tournament held at the arena in March 1948. The judges' split decision for Wallace sparked outrage, with fans booing and tossing bottles into the Ridgewood Grove ring. Floyd Patterson recounted that, as a 15 year prospect, he won by default at the Ridgewood Grove when his Golden Gloves opponent didn't turn up.

In September 1951, Ridgewood Grove began its 26th consecutive boxing season and was one of the country's oldest clubs. The Grove briefly closed to pro boxing for the first time in 33 years for a few months in 1952. The club was unable to secure a TV sponsor for televised bouts. George Sheppard was serving as the arena's promoter in November 1952. Sheppard relied on rising local talent and strong matchmaking to build anticipation. Ridgewood's reopening saw 2,200 fight fans in attendance despite an all-day rain storm, resulting in a live gate of $2,700.

When ABC's boxing coverage expanded in February 1953, a series of Boxing from Ridgewood Grove bouts were televised on Tuesdays until August 1953. The first month featured Jason Owen as announcer, followed by sportscaster Bob Finnegan, who hosted the program until its cancellation.

At the arena in April 1953, undefeated Johnny Saxton secured his 40th win by beating Charley Williams.

=== Wrestling ===
On its December 7, 1926 card, the "new" Ridgewood Grove Arena showcased Doc Sarpolis, Charley "Swedish Tiger" Hanson, Charles Cutler, and Stanislaus Zbyszko.

A featured match at the arena in January 1929 saw Ed "Strangler" Lewis face George Hagen. That year, Ridgewood Grove Arena was the site of two world championship wrestling matches between Dick Shikat and George Hagen, held just two weeks apart. In their first bout, Shikat was declared the winner after a 76-minute match, but the outcome was hotly contested by the Ridgewood Arena crowd.

In 1933, Jack Pfefer was serving as a wrestling matchmaker for James J. Johnston at a number of venues including Ridgewood Grove.

When the arena hosted the Metropolitan A.A.U.'s 1935 New York State wrestling championships, two rings were set up for the first time in the arena's history.

640-pound Blimp Levy headlined a Ridgewood Grove wrestling card against Herbie Freeman on February 7, 1946.

The Grove hosted the American debut of Antonino Rocca in 1949. In February 1951, Rocca headlined at the Grove with Gene Stanlee. Gene Stanlee wrestled Happy Humphrey in a February 1952 feature match at the Ridgewood Grove Arena.

=== Basketball ===
Ridgewood Grove began hosting games of the American Basketball League. On November 7, 1926, the Original Celtics made their first appearance in the 1926-27 season at the arena.

=== Other ===
Joseph Schuster, a leader of German-American Nazis in Brooklyn, addressed more than 5,000 people at the Ridgewood Grove Arena on April 8, 1934.

== Closure ==
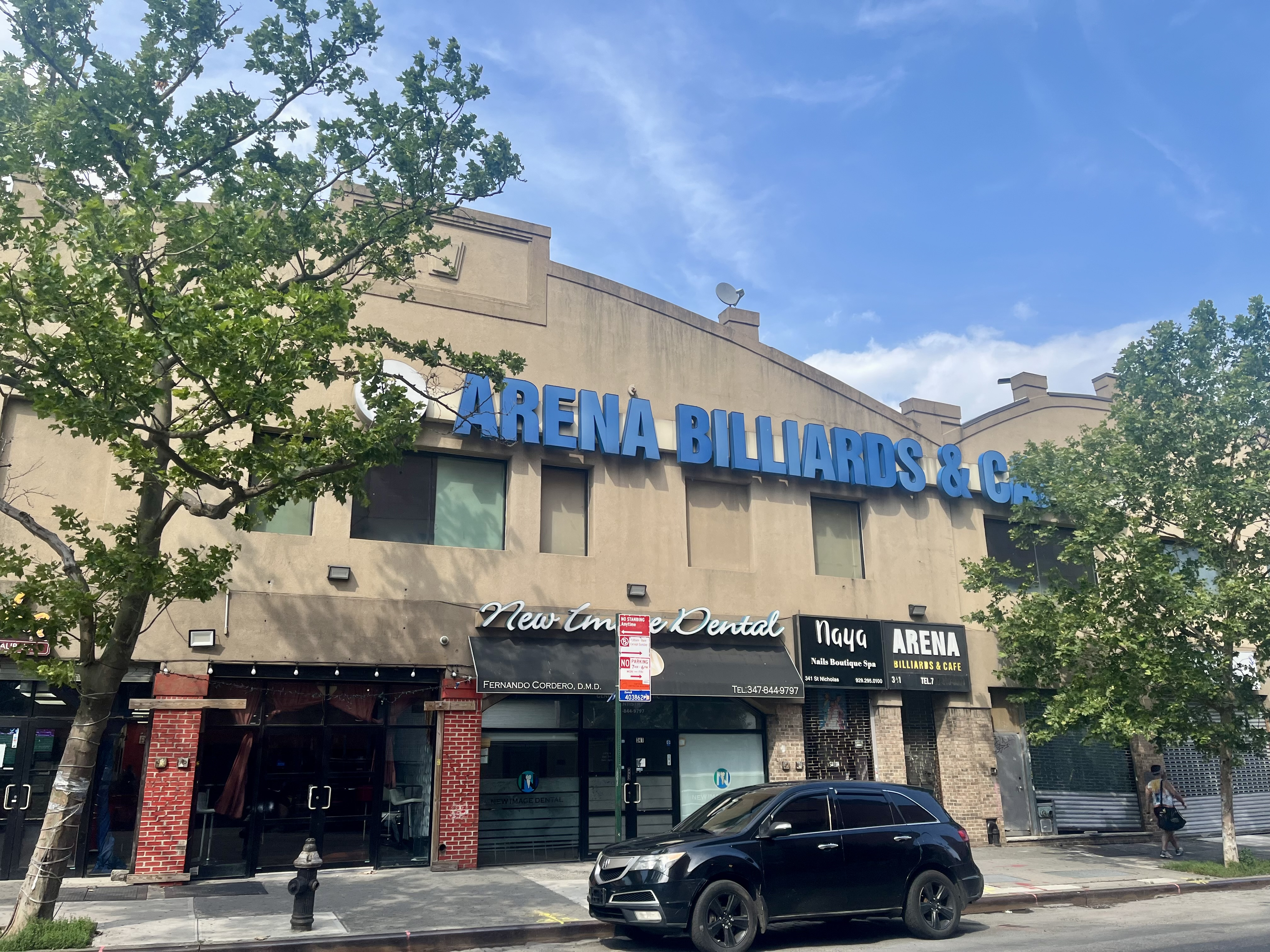
The building viewed from St. Nicholas Avenue in 2025

In 1956, after three decades as one of the top fight clubs in the world, the Ridgewood Grove became a supermarket.

=== New Ridgewood Grove Arena ===
On November 20, 1982, the New Ridgewood Grove Arena reopened to boxing on the same corner at the southwest edge of Queens under Nancy and Frank Sciaaca.

Later becoming a warehouse, a fire gutted the hall that once housed the Ridgewood Grove boxing matches on September 25, 1997. As of 2024, the building still stands and was occupied by several businesses, including Arena Billiards and Cafe.

== See also ==
- Ridgewood, Queens
- Boxing from Ridgewood Grove (1953 – 1953)
