= Paul Lamey =

American bobsledder (1938–2020)

Personal information
- Full name: Paul Emile Lamey
- Born: December 24, 1938 Manchester, New Hampshire, U.S.
- Died: December 15, 2020 (aged 81)

Sport
- Country: United States
- Sport: Bobsleigh

Paul Emile Lamey (December 24, 1938 – December 15, 2020) was an American bobsledder. He competed at the 1968 Winter Olympics and the 1972 Winter Olympics.
