= Rob Pitts =

American businessman (1979–2024)

- Born: Robert Pitts; July 27, 1979; Greenville, South Carolina, U.S.
- Died: August 25, 2024 (aged 45); Seneca, South Carolina, U.S.
- Other names: Rabbit; The Rabbit
- Education: Wade Hampton High School
- Occupation: Car salesman
- Television: Tex-Mex Motors

YouTube information
- Channel: Rob Pitts
- Years active: 2018–2024
- Genre: Auto restoration
- Subscribers: 171 thousand
- Views: 22.2 million
- Last updated: September 8, 2024
- Website: pittstruckservice.com

Robert Clifton "Rabbit" Pitts (July 27, 1979 – August 25, 2024) was an American businessman, television personality, and classic car enthusiast. He was best known for co-starring in the Netflix series Tex-Mex Motors, and his storytelling on the YouTube channel VINwiki. He died at the age of 45 after being diagnosed with stomach cancer.

== Early life ==
Rob Pitts was born in Greenville, South Carolina. His father was a stock car racer and car salesman. Pitts grew up in a trailer park and attended Wade Hampton High School. From an early age, he developed a passion for vintage cars, particularly classic trucks and muscle cars. In a story he recounted on VINwiki, Pitts explained how his nickname "Rabbit" was given to him by the owner of a car dealership when he sold more cars in one day than most other salesmen sold in a month.

== Career ==
Pitts first gained prominence on the YouTube channel VINwiki, where he became known for his storytelling about his experiences in the automotive world. His contributions focused on finding and restoring vintage cars, with a particular interest in classic pickup trucks and muscle cars.

In 2018, Pitts launched his own YouTube channel, where he continued to share stories and content related to the restoration of vintage vehicles. Alongside his media career, Pitts served as the CEO of Pitts Truck Service, a family business established in 1968 that specializes in truck and trailer repair services, and Rabbits Used Cars, both in Seneca, South Carolina.

In 2023, Pitts co-starred with Marcos "Scooter" Carrera in the Netflix series Tex-Mex Motors, which featured the duo searching for vintage cars in Mexico to restore and resell. Notable vehicles featured in the show included a 1969 Opel, a 1965 Volkswagen Bug, and a 1963 Chevrolet Carryall. The first season premiered in June 2023. Pitts was in the process of filming the second season when he was diagnosed with stomach cancer.

== Personal life and death ==
Pitts was a resident of Seneca, South Carolina. During the SEMA show in November 2023, Pitts began not feeling well and experiencing symptoms, including weight loss and acid reflux. He sought medical treatment for his symptoms, but did not receive a diagnosis of stage-four stomach cancer until March 2024. Shortly after his diagnosis, Pitts married his long-time girlfriend, Dr. Randi Foraker. He continued working on Tex-Mex Motors during his treatment, and completed the filming of season two before his condition worsened. Pitts announced his diagnosis publicly in a YouTube video, in which he reflected on his life and accomplishments. He died in hospice care on August 25, 2024, at the age of 45. Pitts' funeral, which was preceded by a two-hour car show, was held at Rock Springs Baptist Church in Easley, South Carolina, which has a capacity of 3,500 people. Ed Bolian delivered the eulogy. A tribute video was produced that featured an overview of his life and work.
