= Bonny Warner =

American luger, bob pilot and pilot

Bonny Warner (now Bonny Simi; born April 7, 1962, in Mount Baldy, California) is an American luger who competed from the early 1980s to the early 1990s. She later competed in women's bobsleigh from 1999 to 2002. She was a pilot for United Airlines from 1990 to 2004, when she quit United and went to work for JetBlue Airways. In December 2020 she left Jet Blue and went to work for Joby Aviation as the Head of Air Operations.

== Luge career ==
Warner's career in luge began when she was a torchbearer for the 1980 Winter Olympics in Lake Placid, New York, while as a freshman from Stanford University. While watching the luge competitions in Lake Placid, she became hooked on the event. This would lead Warner to travel to West Germany and follow luge activities over there. Warner would then learn to speak fluent German while over there. While at Stanford, Warner switched her major from civil engineering to broadcast journalism after earning an athletic scholarship to play field hockey. Competing in three Winter Olympics, she earned her best finish of sixth in the women's singles event at Calgary in 1988. Warner also organized Luge camps throughout the United States, which made a huge contribution to the growth of the sport in this country.

== Broadcasting career ==
Following the 1992 Winter Olympics, Warner retired and served as a color commentator for CBS Sports during their coverage of the Winter Olympics in 1994 and 1998. Prior to that, she had been a television sports reporter for the San Francisco area during the mid-1980s.

== Airline career ==
After the 1988 Winter Olympics in Calgary, Warner earned a 10,000 USD scholarship and earned her aviator's license. Prior to joining United in November 1990, she worked as a flight instructor and a corporate pilot. One of Warner's clients as a corporate pilot was the late promoter Bill Graham.

== Personal life ==
Warner married Tony Simi, a firefighter and paramedic who was in one of her classes in 1996. A daughter was born in 1998.

== Bobsleigh career ==
After a 1999 vacation to Park City, Utah, Warner went over to bobsleigh and competed from 1999 to 2002. While searching for a brakeman, she discovered Vonetta Flowers, who would go on to win the gold medal in the two-woman event at the 2002 Winter Olympics in Salt Lake City. Warner's best seasonal finish in the Bobsleigh World Cup was third overall in 2000–1. During the 2001-2 Bobsleigh World Cup, Warner carried on her sled a memorial to the victims of the September 11, 2001 attacks in New York and Washington, D.C. She tried out for the 2002 US team, but did not qualify though Flowers did. She also participated in simulation for bobsleigh starts prior to the 2002 games. Because she did not qualify for the 2002 Winter Olympics, she worked for NBC Sports during their television coverage of the games.

== Life since the Winter Olympics ==
Since her retirement from bobsleigh, Warner was a pilot for JetBlue Airways, eventually moving up the ranks to senior management in the company. She eventually became President of JetBlue's Venture Capital arm, JetBlue Technology Ventures. Currently, she continues her work in the aviation industry for Joby Aviation.
