= Nordic skiing at the 1988 Winter Olympics =

At the 1988 Winter Olympics, thirteen Nordic skiing events were contested – eight cross-country skiing events, three ski jumping events, and two Nordic combined events. The team competitions in ski jumping and Nordic combined were new events for these Games.

Nordic skiing discipline	Men's events	Women's events
Cross-country skiing	• 15 km	• 5 km
Cross-country skiing	• 30 km	• 10 km
Cross-country skiing	• 50 km	• 20 km
Cross-country skiing	• 4 × 10 km relay	• 4 × 5 km relay
Ski jumping	• Large hill – individual	none
Ski jumping	• Normal hill – individual	none
Ski jumping	• Large hill – team	none
Nordic combined	• Individual	none
Nordic combined	• Team	none
