= Robert B. Pitts =

Robert Pitts
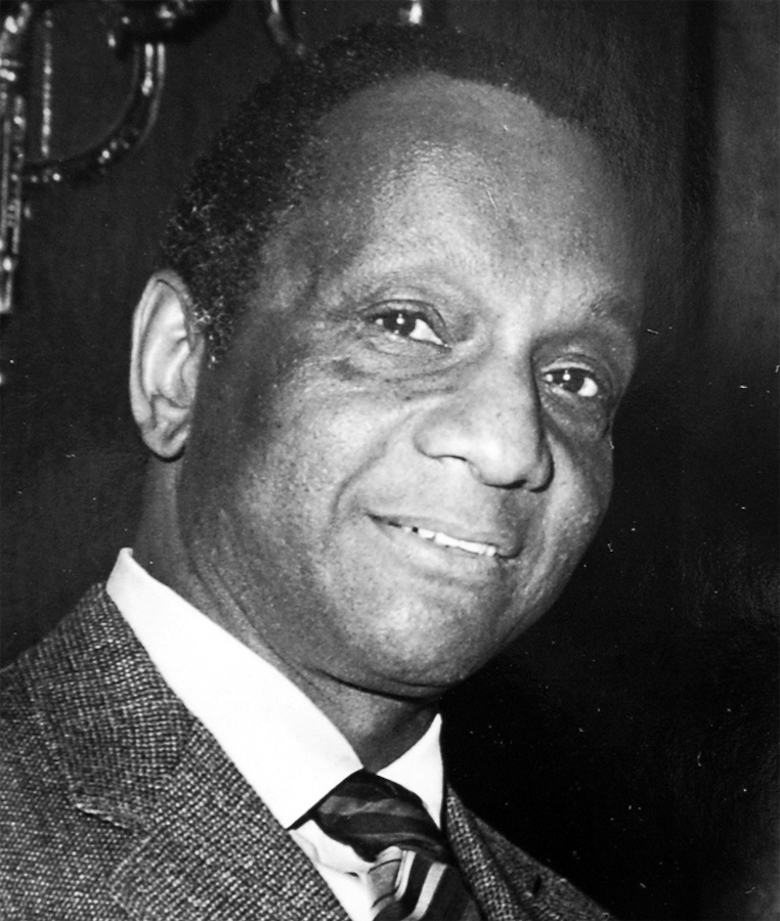
- Robert B. Pitts
- Born: August 29, 1909; Macon, GA
- Died: August 30, 1982; San Francisco, California
- Occupation: HUD West Coast Regional Administrator

Robert Pitts (1909–1982) was the first African-American to serve as a Regional Administrator of the U.S. Department of Housing and Urban Development (HUD).

== Significant contributions ==
Pitts was a long-term civil servant in the housing administration field. He began his government housing career as an Assistant Regional Economist with the Public Housing Administration in Seattle, Washington, in 1947. He rose quickly in his career through several government housing agencies: as an economist, market analyst and race relations officer. He was selected Deputy Regional Administrator of the Housing and Home Finance Agency (HHFA) for the West Coast Region in 1962. He was named Regional Administrator in 1964, at a time when it was so unusual for a black person to achieve such high rank that the local newspaper used the headline West Housing--Negro Chief? to announce his selection. When the HHFA was absorbed into the new Department of Housing and Urban Development in August 1965, Pitts was named the Regional Administrator for the Western Region, and was also asked to chair the task force to lead the reorganization plan for the HUD regional offices. He became known as one of the principal architects of the new structure of the HUD.

Pitts was HHFA Regional Administrator at the time when California's Proposition 14 amended the state constitution to nullify the Rumford Fair Housing Act. Although this action put his office into unprecedented turmoil, Pitts said that the act was not all bad, since it brought the undercurrent of opposition to fair housing out into the open. Pitts' dedicated assistance to the community in the ensuing race riots in the Watts section of Los Angeles and in Oakland, in the Bay Area, earned him respect on all sides and resulted in the new Watts Community Center being named after him; The Robert B. Pitts Westminster Neighborhood Center. Bob also helped with the negotiations when, in 1969, American-Indian activists occupied Alcatraz Island To honor Bob for his many contributions to their community over the years, in 1986 the City and County of San Francisco Commission of the Housing Authority designated the new Yerba Buena Plaza West as The Robert B. Pitts Housing Development.

In retirement, Pitts continued to work as a lecturer at the University of California, Berkeley, School of Business Administration and also served as CEO of his own firm, Urban Consultants, Inc. He later became Vice President and member of the board of, Applied Urbanology, Inc. in San Francisco. He was a member of the board of Twin Pines Federal Savings & Loan in Berkeley and served on the Marin County Redevelopment Agency. He consulted with the Organization of American States on housing in the Republic of Trinidad & Tobago. He served as chief consultant to President Jimmy Carter's transition team on housing and development, often served as a consultant to his old agency, and occasionally represented other firms in their dealings with the agency.

== Personal life ==
Pitts, born August 29, 1909, was the second of four sons of Willis N. and Roberta Pitts, of Macon, Georgia. His brothers were Drs. Willis N Pitts Jr., Raymond J. Pitts, and Nathan A. Pitts.

He graduated from Macon, Georgia's Ballard Normal School in 1926. After 12 years of sporadic college education during the difficult depression years, Pitts graduated from Howard University in Washington, DC in 1938, earning a BS in mathematics with a minor in physics. He then went to the University of Washington in Seattle, where he graduated in 1941 with a master's degree in sociology. His thesis was on the subject of Organized Labor and the Negro in Seattle.

He was conscripted into the Army in 1943 and served with the 492nd Antiaircraft-Artillery Automatic-Weapons Battalion, in Europe and Japan, until his discharge at the end of 1945.

Pitts met his future wife, Mattalyn Coleman, in 1941, when he was employed as an instructor in economics at LeMoyne College in Memphis, Tennessee. The two were married in January 1946, after he returned from the war. They made their permanent home in Mill Valley, California, where both served on numerous charitable and social organizations. The couple had no children.

Pitts was active in the Mill Valley Community Church, and served on its board of trustees. He had a leadership role in creating a Bay Area Black Fund and was one of the founders of the Marin Co-op in Corte Madera. Mattalyn was, for most of her career, a kindergarten teacher in the Hunters Point section of San Francisco. In retirement, she started her own successful home furnishing design and clothing design companies.

Pitts died at Kaiser Hospital in San Francisco of kidney failure on August 30, 1982, one day after his 73rd birthday.
