= Jeff Tucker (luger) =

American luger (born 1956)

Personal information
- Born: December 10, 1956 (age 69) White Plains, New York, United States

Sport
- Sport: Luge

Jeff Tucker (born December 10, 1956) is an American luger. He competed in the men's singles event at the 1980 Winter Olympics.
