= Art Devlin (ski jumper) =

American ski jumper

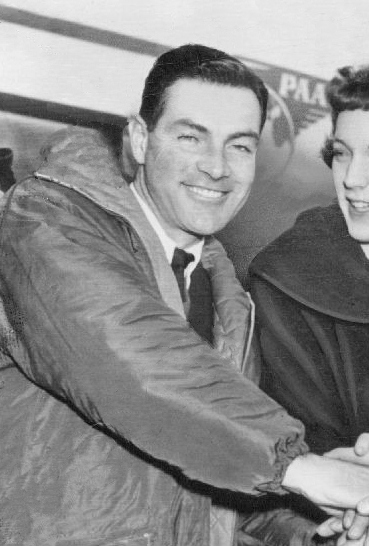
- Art Devlin in 1956

Personal information
- Born: September 7, 1922 Lake Placid, New York, U.S.
- Died: April 22, 2004 (aged 81) Lake Placid, New York, U.S.

Sport
- Sport: Ski jumping
- Club: Lake Placid Sno-Birds

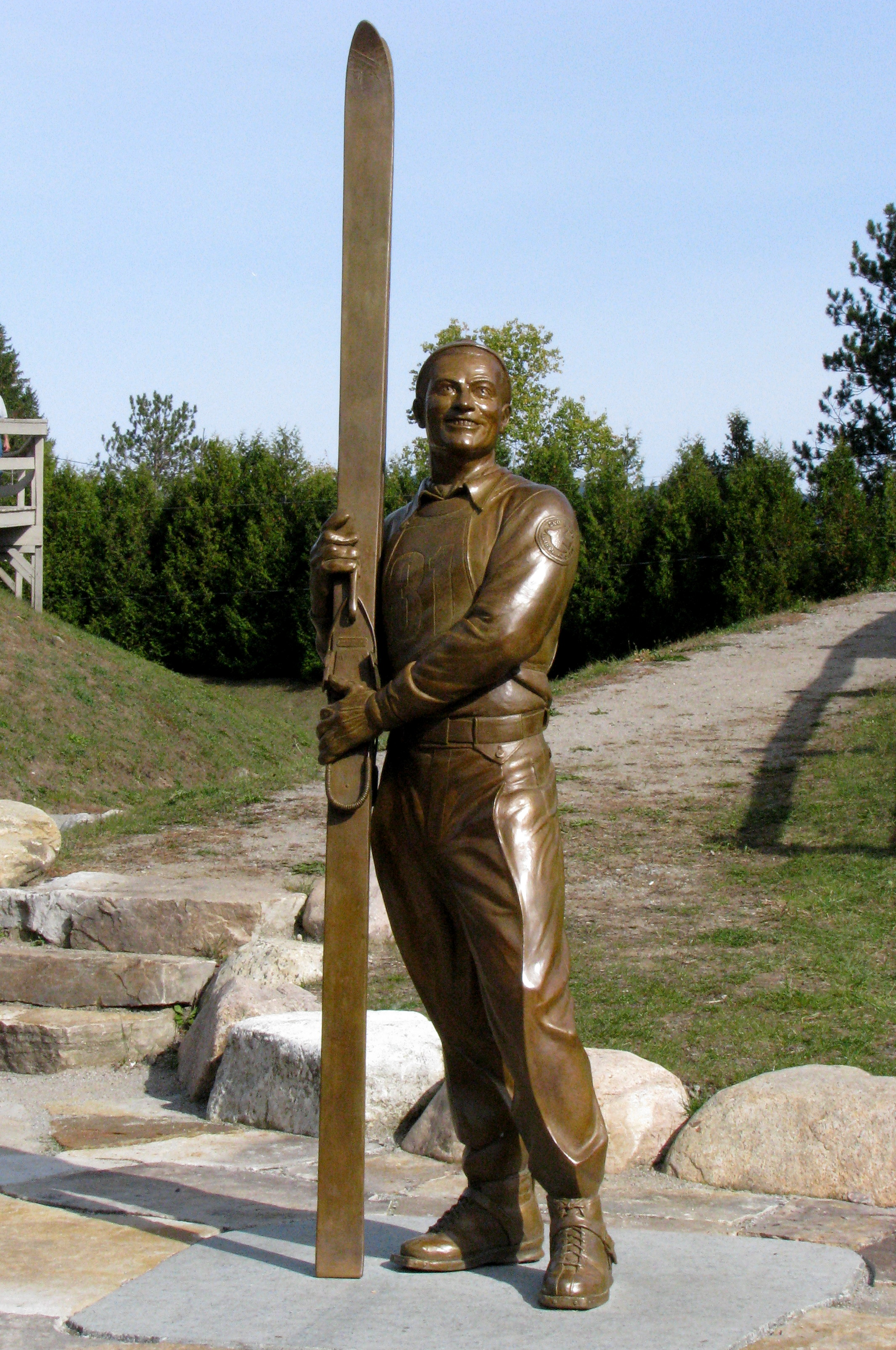
Statue of Art Devlin at the Lake Placid Olympic Ski Jumping Complex

Arthur "Art" Donovan Devlin (September 7, 1922 – April 22, 2004) was an American ski jumper who competed during the 1950s. A native of Lake Placid, New York, he finished fifth in the individual large hill at the 1950 FIS Nordic World Ski Championships which were held in Lake Placid. Devlin also made five Olympics teams, competing in the 1952 and 1956 Winter Olympics, where he finished 15th and 21st in the individual large hills, respectively.

Prior to the 1950s, Devlin also flew fifty combat missions over Europe during World War II as a B-24 pilot, earning three Purple Hearts and numerous other military honors.

While in ski jumping, Devlin went into the hotel business in 1953, opening Art Devlin's Olympic Motor Inn, a hotel he would run until he retired and passed it onto his son, Art Jr., in 1992. He also was a color commentator for ABC Sports during the 1964, 1968, 1976 and 1980 Winter Olympics, becoming lifelong friends with sportscaster Chris Schenkel.

Devlin, with fellow Lake Placidians J. Bernard Fell, Norman Hess, Ronald MacKenzie, Jack Shea, Vern Lamb, Luke Patnode, Serge Lussi, Bob Peacock and Bob Allen, also led the effort to bring the 1980 Winter Olympics to Lake Placid, lobbying across Europe to present their case to the International Olympic Committee. In 1974, Sports Illustrated magazine gave each kudos for their efforts.

Devlin married and had three children. His first wife died in 1989 and he remarried several years later. He died of brain cancer in 2004.

Devlin appeared as an imposter on the October 2, 1961 episode of the game show To Tell the Truth. He received one of four possible votes. After he identified himself by name, Host Bud Collyer told the audience of his background as an Olympic athlete.
