= Jim Lampley =

American sportscaster, news anchor, and film producer

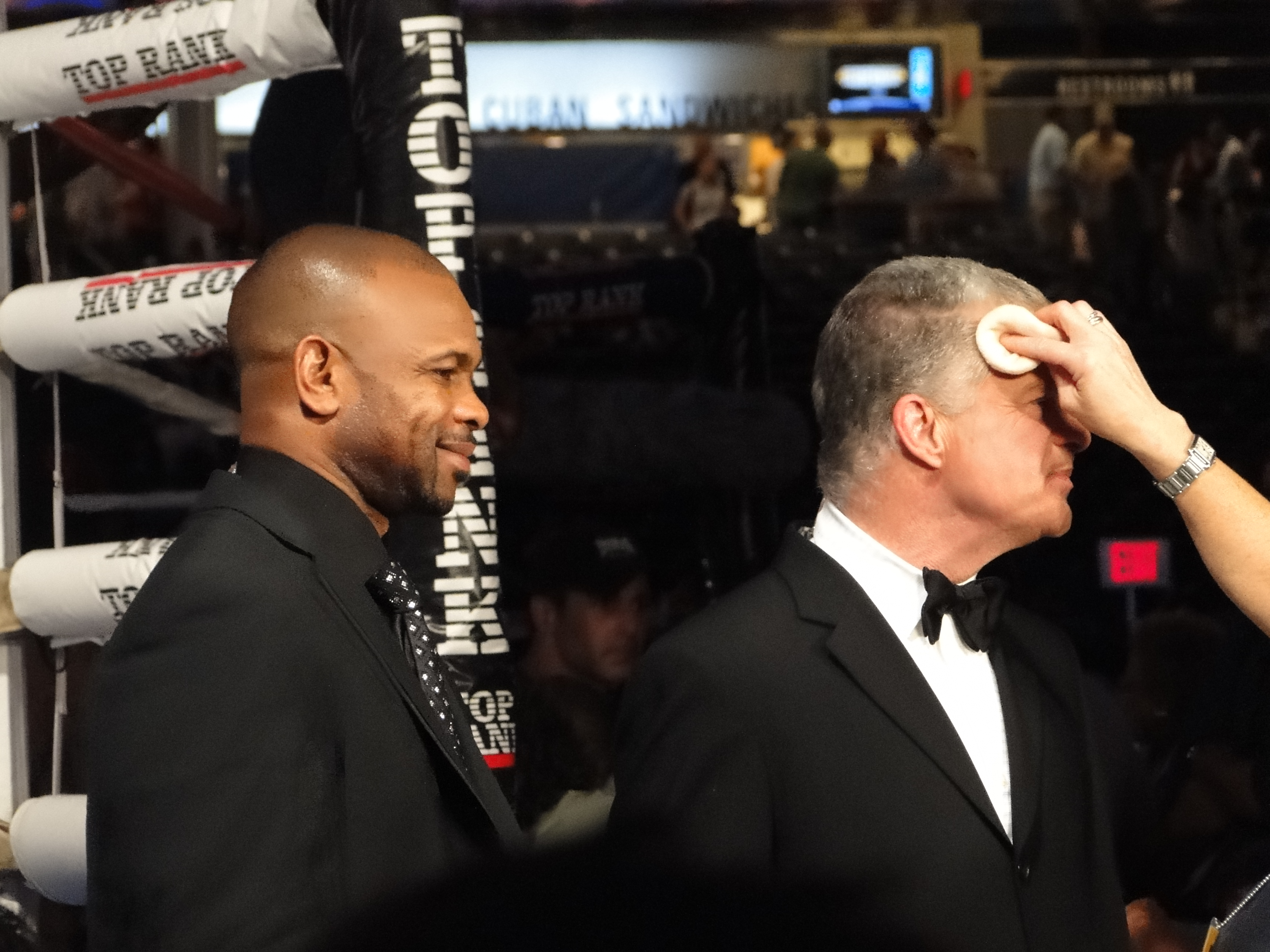
- Lampley (right) in New York in 2010
- Born: April 8, 1949 (age 77); Hendersonville, North Carolina, U.S.
- Education: University of North Carolina
- Occupation: Television journalist
- Notable credit(s): HBO World Championship Boxing anchor and co-host (1988–2018); Olympic Games reporter and anchor (1984–2008)
- Spouses: Bree Walker (m. 1990–1999): Debra Schuss
- Children: 4

James Lampley (born April 8, 1949) is an American sportscaster, news anchor, film producer, and restaurant owner. He is best known as a blow-by-blow announcer on HBO World Championship Boxing for 30 years. He covered a record 14 Olympic Games on U.S. television, most recently the 2008 Summer Olympics in Beijing, China.

== Early life and career ==
Lampley was born in Hendersonville, North Carolina, and after the sixth grade was raised in Miami, Florida. His father died when he was five, and his mother immersed him in sports to make up for what she felt his father would have done. In 1971, he graduated from the University of North Carolina where he majored in English and earned a master's degree from UNC's Department of Radio, Television and Motion Pictures.

== Broadcast network television ==
=== ABC Sports ===
In 1974, while in graduate school, he was chosen along with Don Tollefson in what ABC called a talent hunt. ABC executives thought that Lampley's youthful looks would make him endearing to the college crowds they looked to attract for their college football games. At ABC, he covered such events as Major League Baseball and college basketball games, the 1986 and 1987 Indianapolis 500, the 1977 Monon Bell game between DePauw University and Wabash College, five Olympics, as well as the program Wide World of Sports.

From 1983 to 1985, he was the studio host of ABC broadcasts of the United States Football League (USFL), a spring league that featured stars such as Herschel Walker, Jim Kelly, Steve Young, and Reggie White.

On July 4, 1984, with Sam Posey alongside, he called the NASCAR Firecracker 400, and interviewed President Ronald Reagan during the winner's interview with race winner Richard Petty.

In 1985, Lampley along with Al Michaels served as anchors for ABC's coverage of Super Bowl XIX, the first Super Bowl that ABC televised. After the game, Lampley presided over the presentation ceremony for the trophy.

=== KCBS ===
In 1987, Lampley moved to CBS. At CBS, he took over duties as co-anchor on the daily news show in Los Angeles, and also was a correspondent. That same year, he began working for HBO, covering boxing and HBO's annual telecast of the Wimbledon Championships. He also attended the Albertville Olympics in 1992, as a news anchor for KCBS-TV.

=== NBC Sports ===
In 1992, Lampley moved to NBC, where he helped cover the 1992 Barcelona Olympics, 1993 Ryder Cup, 1994 Grand Prix of Toronto, and the 1996 Atlanta Olympics. In 1993, Lampley took over studio hosting duties for Bob Costas on The NFL on NBC. Lampley moved to play-by-play duties for NBC's NFL telecasts the following year and was later replaced by Greg Gumbel. While with NFL on NBC, he was slated to join Jim Laslavic as the #8 announcing team in 1997 during Week 9's Tennessee Oilers-Arizona Cardinals game; however, he was not placed in the lineup at all. In 1995, he began working at the Real Sports with Bryant Gumbel HBO series. In 1998, he covered the Nagano Olympics and the Goodwill Games for Turner, and in 2000, he covered the Sydney Olympics, again for NBC.

In 2004, Lampley was the daytime anchor for NBC's Olympics coverage for the 2004 Summer Olympics, as well as anchoring the USA Network's coverage of the Games. In 2006, Lampley served as a central correspondent for the 2006 Winter Olympics which aired on the networks of NBC Universal. Torino 2006 was the 13th Olympics Lampley covered, surpassing the record set by America's original voice of the Olympics, Jim McKay. Lampley was again called upon to anchor for the 2008 Summer Olympics in Beijing, China, Lampley's 14th Games. The 2010 Winter Olympics was the first time since the 1980 Summer Olympics that he didn't cover. Al Michaels served as the daytime host of the 2010 Olympics on NBC. Lampley also did not cover the 2012 Summer Olympics either in which Michaels also served as the daytime host.

== HBO World Championship Boxing ==
Fans may best know Lampley for his work on HBO World Championship Boxing, Boxing After Dark, and on the HBO pay-per-view telecasts from March 1988 until December 2018, when HBO announced that they would drop the boxing program. As blow by blow announcer, he called some of boxing's most famous moments, such as Thunder Meets Lightning, when Julio César Chávez saved himself from a decision defeat by knocking out Meldrick Taylor (who was leading the fight on two of the three official scorecards) with only two seconds to go in the last round, and James "Buster" Douglas's upset of Mike Tyson for the world heavyweight championship. Other highlights in his career were the first Riddick Bowe-Andrew Golota fight at Madison Square Garden, where a riot occurred following the "Foul Pole's" disqualification for low blows, and the famous "It happened...IT HAPPENED!" call of George Foreman's miracle comeback against then heavyweight champion Michael Moorer when a straight right ended Moorer's reign.

Lampley also hosted a series called Legendary Nights in 12 installments in honor of HBO's three decades covering boxing in 2004, recounting 12 memorable fights broadcast on HBO in that timespan.

Lampley later wrote, hosted, and executive produced his own studio boxing news show, The Fight Game with Jim Lampley on HBO.

== Olympic Coverage ==
- 1976 Winter Olympics (play-by-play for ABC)
- 1976 Summer Olympics (play-by-play for ABC)
- 1980 Winter Olympics (play-by-play for ABC)
- 1984 Winter Olympics (daytime host for ABC)
- 1984 Summer Olympics (late-night host for ABC)
- 1992 Winter Olympics (coverage for KCBS-TV)
- 1992 Summer Olympics (late-night host for NBC)
- 1996 Summer Olympics (late-night host for NBC)
- 1998 Winter Olympics (primetime host for TNT)
- 2000 Summer Olympics (cable host for MSNBC)
- 2002 Winter Olympics (cable host for both MSNBC and CNBC)
- 2004 Summer Olympics (daytime host for NBC and cable host for USA Network)
- 2006 Winter Olympics (daytime and late-night host for NBC)
- 2008 Summer Olympics (daytime host for NBC)

== Sports radio ==
Lampley was the first program host on New York's sports talk radio station WFAN when it began operation on July 1, 1987.

== Awards and recognitions ==
In 1992, he won the Sam Taub Award for excellence in boxing broadcasting journalism.

For his participation in the Real Sports with Bryant Gumbel HBO series, Lampley earned three Emmy awards.

Lampley was inducted into the International Boxing Hall of Fame in its 2015 class.

== Filmography ==
Year	Title	Role	Notes	Ref
2012	The Other Dream Team	Himself	Documentary about the Lithuania men's national basketball team at the 1992 Summer Olympics.	
2015	At Last: Mayweather vs. Pacquiao	Himself	Documentary	
2015	Inside Mayweather vs. Pacquiao	Himself	Television Documentary series, 1 episode	
2015	Mayweather/Pacquiao: The Legends Speak	Himself	Documentary	

== Life outside sports ==
=== Film and producing career ===
Lampley's movie production company, Crystal Spring Productions, has produced a handful of movies, including 2000's Welcome to Hollywood. The company, now known as Atticus Entertainment was executive producer of the HBO documentary series, On Freddie Roach in 2012–13. Since 2012, it has produced the continuing series, The Fight Game with Jim Lampley.

In addition to several minor credits as an announcer in films, Lampley portrayed himself in the movies like Rocky Balboa, Southpaw, Creed, Grudge Match, all in all more than a dozen feature film credits. He also appeared in the 2007 sports comedy films Blades of Glory starring Will Ferrell and Jon Heder, and Balls of Fury, with Christopher Walken. Lampley also appeared on television in shows such as Everybody Hates Chris, MacGyver, the Andy Samberg HBO mockumentary 7 Days in Hell, and Eastbound & Down.

=== Personal life ===
Lampley was married to former news anchor Bree Walker from 1990 to 1999. The pair had a son, Aaron James Lampley, born in August 1991.

Lampley and his current wife, Debra, live in Chapel Hill, North Carolina. Their blended family includes five daughters, two sons and nine grandchildren. Lampley is the former owner of two restaurants in Utah, both of which were named the Lakota Restaurant and Bar.

One of his daughters is Brooke Lampley, Global Chairman and Head of Global Fine Art at Sotheby's.

=== Domestic violence arrest ===
In 2007, Lampley was arrested for suspicion of domestic violence over an incident that took place at his girlfriend's home. He later pleaded no contest to violating a restraining order and was sentenced to three years of probation, plus required to complete a 52-week domestic violence counseling program.
