= List of skiing deaths =

This is a list of skiing deaths of notable people, in chronological order, and includes skiers and snowboarders both professional and recreational whose deaths are due to accidents or avalanches.

All cases in the list below are from alpine or downhill skiing activities; no skiers have been known to have died in any major international ski jumping competitions (e.g. FIS Ski Jumping World Cup, FIS Ski Jumping Continental Cup, FIS Nordic World Ski Championships, and the Olympic Games), though many ski jumpers have died during practice or in national events (nb:Skader og dødsulykker i skihopping).

== List ==
Background shading indicates the individual was not practicing or participating in sport skiing.

Name	Age	Location	Country	Date of accident
Mieczysław Karłowicz	32	Tatra Mountains	Poland–Slovakia border	1909-02-08
Giacinto Sertorelli	22	Garmisch, Bavaria	Germany	1938-01-26
James Palmer-Tomkinson	36	Klosters, Graubünden	Switzerland	1952-01-07
Paul Ausserleitner	26	Bischofshofen	Austria	1952-01-09
John Semmelink	20	Garmisch, Bavaria	West Germany	1959-02-07
Ross Milne	19	Patscherkofel, Innsbruck, Tyrol	Austria	1964-01-25
Buddy Werner	28	Las Trais Fluors slope, St. Moritz	Switzerland	1964-04-12
Barbara Henneberger	23	Las Trais Fluors slope, St. Moritz	Switzerland	1964-04-12
Michel Bozon	20	Piste Emile Allais, Megève, Haute-Savoie	France	1970-01-23
Leonardo David	18	Whiteface Mountain, New York	United States	1979-03-03 (Note: Crashed and suffered brain trauma during a World Cup downhill race at Lake Placid. After being in a coma for nearly six years, he died at age twenty-four on 26 February 1985 in Gressoney-Saint-Jean, Italy.)
Sara Mustonen	16	Hintertux, Tyrol	Austria	1979-09-12
Josef Walcher	29	Schladming, Styria	Austria	1984-01-22
Hugh Lindsay	34	Gotschnagrat, Klosters, Graubünden	Switzerland	1988-03-10
Alfonso, Duke of Anjou and Cádiz	52	Beaver Creek, Colorado	United States	1989-01-30
Gernot Reinstadler	20	Lauberhorn, Wengen, Bern	Switzerland	1991-01-20
Nicolas Bochatay	27	Les Arcs, Savoie	France	1992-02-22
Ulrike Maier	26	Garmisch, Bavaria	Germany	1994-01-29
Michael Kennedy	39	Aspen, Colorado	United States	1997-12-31
Sonny Bono	62	Heavenly, Nevada	United States	1998-01-05
Doak Walker	71	Steamboat, Colorado	United States	1998-01-30 (Note: Walker died eight months after the accident, on 27 September 1998.)
Michel Trudeau	23	Kokanee Glacier Park, British Columbia	Canada	1998-11-13
Régine Cavagnoud	31	Pitztal Glacier, Innsbruck, Tyrol	Austria	2001-10-31
Marco Siffredi	22	Mount Everest, Koshi Province	Nepal	2002-09-08
Line Østvold	25	Valle Nevado, Santiago	Chile	2004-09-19
Craig Kelly	36	Revelstoke, British Columbia	Canada	2003-01-20
Jonatan Johansson	26	Whiteface Mountain, New York	United States	2006-03-12
Doug Coombs	48	Couloir de Polichinelle, La Grave	France	2006-04-03
Edward LaChapelle	80	Monarch Ski Area, Colorado	United States	2007-02-01
John McWethy	60	Keystone, Colorado	United States	2008-02-06
John Nicoletta	27	Alyeska Resort, Alaska	United States	2008-04-11
Natasha Richardson	45	Mont Tremblant, Quebec	Canada	2009-03-16
Shane McConkey	39	Dolomites	Italy	2009-03-26
C. R. Johnson	26	Squaw Valley, California	United States	2010-02-24
Jamie Pierre	38	Snowbird, Utah	United States	2011-11-24
Sarah Burke	29	Park City, Utah	United States	2012-01-10
Prince Friso of Orange-Nassau	44	Lech, Vorarlberg	Austria	2012-02-17
Nik Zoricic	29	Grindelwald, Bern	Switzerland	2012-03-10
Claude Nobs	76	Caux-sur-Montreux, Vaud	Switzerland	2012-12-24
David Coe	58	Aspen, Colorado	United States	2013-01-21
Philippe Favre	51	Val Thorens, Savoie, French Alps	France	2013-12-06
Andreas Fransson	31	Monte San Lorenzo, Patagonia	Argentina–Chile border	2014-09-29
JP Auclair	37	Monte San Lorenzo, Patagonia	Argentina–Chile border	2014-09-29
Sam Beall	39	Beaver Creek, Colorado	United States	2016-02-25
Matilda Hargin née Rapaport	30	Farellones, Santiago	Chile	2016-07-14
David Poisson	35	Nakiska, Alberta	Canada	2017-11-13
Amanda Asay	33	Whitewater Ski Resort, British Columbia	Canada	2022-01-07
Gaspard Ulliel	37	La Rosière Ski Resort, Savoie	France	2022-01-18
Matilde Lorenzi	19	Bolzano, South Tyrol	Italy	2024-10-28
Sophie Hediger	26	Arosa Lenzerheide, Grisons	Switzerland	2024-12-23
Lynn Ban	52	Aspen, Colorado	United States	2024-12-24
Tomáš Klouček	45	Špindlerův Mlýn	Czech Republic	2025-03-16
