= Rick Armstrong =

American freeskier

"Sick" Rick Armstrong is a professional skier, freeskiing pioneer, mountaineer, paraglider, businessman and serial entrepreneur based in Jackson Hole, Wyoming. He was a pioneering guide in the early years of Alaska Heli-skiing while working as a lead guide for Valdez Heli-skiing and Doug Coombs as chronicled in the 2007 feature film Steep. He was a member of the ultra-elite group of skiers called the Jackson Hole Airforce who transformed skiing in the 1990s and 2000s. He is known for having skied unskied lines such as his first and unrepeated massive drop into the left side of the notorious Corbet's Couloir at Jackson Hole Mountain Resort. He was the first person to have both skied and snowboarded the Grand Teton in Teton National Park. He has many first ski descents in China, Alaska, Europe, Antarctica, South America, and South Georgia Island. He was an athlete in the 1998 and 1999 Winter X-Games in Crested Butte. He was Awarded sponsorships by The North Face and Salomon. He also became an athlete talent scout for The North Face building a world-class ski team by discovering soon to be ski stars such as Sage-Cattabriga-Alosa, Ingrid Backstrom, Kitt Deslauries, Griffen Post, and Hillary Nelson. Armstrong was also a co-founder of the Teton Gravity Research film production company. He served on the board of directors for Intrawest from 2012 to 2017.

== Films ==
Armstrong appears in the following films:

- Steep (film) (2007)
- Warren Miller's Black Diamond Rush (1993)
- Warren Miller's Storm (2001)
- Teton Gravity Research's first film, The Continuum (1996)
- Teton Gravity Research's Harvest (1997)
- Teton Gravity Research's Further (2000)
- Teton Gravity Research's The Big One (2006)
- Matchstick Productions Soul Sessions - (1993)
- Matchstick Productions The Hedonist (1994)
- Matchstick Productions The Tribe (1995)
- Someday Somebody will ski that. (2010)
- Swift Silent Deep (2009)
- RAP Films Snow Drifters
- RAP Films Cosmic Winter
