= Eric Pehota =

Canadian alpine skier

- Born: November 17, 1964
- Occupations: Alpine Skier and Mountaineer
- Known for: Extreme skiing, film appearances (including Steep (2007) and Warren Miller films)
- Spouse: Parveen Pehota

Eric Pehota (born November 17, 1964) is a Canadian alpine skier, best known for his more than 40 first descents of mountains on skis, and his appearances in a number of ski films, including ski documentary Steep (2007), and a number of Warren Miller films.

== Biography ==
Born November 17, 1964, Eric Pehota grew up in Mackenzie, a logging town in British Columbia. Pehota's father and grandfather were loggers.

Pehota rose to fame as a big mountain skier in the early 1990s with his friend and ski partner, Trevor Petersen. The pair met shortly after Pehota graduated from high school, and went on to complete a number of first descents, including Mount Waddington in 1987. The two appeared in ski films, including Cosmic Winter and Tales from the Snow Zone.

Eric Pehota and his wife, Parveen, live in Pemberton, British Columbia, and own and operate a jet-boating company, Whistler Jet Boating. The couple has two sons, Dalton and Logan (both are named after mountain summits). The family of four can all be seen in the film, Warren Miller's Cold Fusion (2001).

Pehota remains a recognisable figure in alpine skiing, appearing in magazine articles and films, such as Steep (2007), and 2009's The Edge of Never, and is a sponsored athlete of Rossignol and Arc’teryx.

== Filmography ==
While not an exhaustive list, Eric Pehota has been featured in a number of ski films, including:

- The Edge of Never (2009)
- Steep (2007)
- Warren Miller's Playground (2007)
- Warren Miller's Cold Fusion (2001)
- Tales from the Snow Zone (1991)
- Cosmic Winter
