= Subaru Freeskiing World Tour =

The Freeskiing World Tour is the largest and longest running competitive big mountain freeskiing tour in the history of the sport. Created and produced by Mountain Sports International, Inc. and founded in 1997, FWT alumni include Shane McConkey, Brant Moles, Kent Kreitler, Chris Davenport, Seth Morrison, Rex Wehrman, Dean Cummings, Dave Swanwick, Wendy Fisher, Ingrid Backstrom, Dana Flahr, Kaj Zackrison, Karina Hollekim, Marja Persson, Julien Lopez, Guerlain Chicherit, Sebi Hyver, Chopo Diaz, Griffin Post, Drew Stoecklein, Crystal Wright and Hannah Whitney. The FWT also features the coveted Sickbird Award which honors the athlete with the most spirit, style and wow-factor.
