= Steep (film) =

- Directed by: Mark Obenhaus
- Written by: Mark Obenhaus
- Starring: Ingrid Backstrom; Anselme Baud; Bill Briggs; Doug Coombs; Chris Davenport; Stefano De Benedetti; Andrew McClean; Shane McConkey; Seth Morrison; Eric Pehota; Glen Plake
- Narrated by: Peter Krause
- Music by: Victor Magro; Anton Sanko
- Distributed by: Sony Pictures Classics
- Release date: January 16, 2007
- Running time: 92 minutes
- Country: United States
- Language: English

Steep is a 2007 documentary about extreme skiing written and directed by Mark Obenhaus. Steep explores the history of extreme and Big Mountain Skiing, starting with its roots in 1960s and 1970s North America and Europe, with Bill Briggs' now famous first descent of the Grand Teton, and progressing through to the current day sport.

Steep was shot in High Definition and on film in a number of locations including Alaska, France, Canada and Iceland. Steep made its premiere in the Spotlight Section of the 2007 Tribeca Film Festival. In North America, Steep was acquired by Sony Pictures Classics and released to DVD on 18 March 2008.

== Cast and crew ==
Written and directed by Mark Obenhaus, Steep is narrated by American actor Peter Krause as well as ski mountaineer and historian Louis Dawson. William A. Kerig is a co-producer and story creator. It includes interviews and narratives provided by, and footage of, well known ski personalities including Bill Briggs, Doug Coombs Lou Dawson and Glen Plake. It also notably stars Shane McConkey, Seth Morrison, Andrew McClean, Eric Pehota, Rick Armstrong, Ingrid Backstrom, Stefano De Benedetti, Anselme Baud, Chris Davenport and Emily Coombs, amongst others.

In a 2008 interview with National Geographic Adventure, Mark Obenhaus spoke of the importance of both Bill Briggs' and Doug Coombs' presence in the film, saying:

"In a sense, between the two of them, we felt that we could almost see the whole sport evolving. That was the moment we thought, Ah-ha, this is the story we want to tell."

== Critical reception ==
Steep received generally mixed reviews from critics. As of July 2010 review aggregator Rotten Tomatoes reports that 51% of 41 professional critics have given the film a positive review, the consensus was "Steep is a mixed bag of breathtaking mountain footage and yawn-inducing banter."

New York Times reviewer Stephen Holden says of Steep:

"The movie... is an undeniably impressive visual spectacle".

John Anderson of Variety says:

"Steep has its moments. Some are exhilarating, others seemingly insane. But the movie also feels like a sermon... they’re sliding down hills on two sticks. It should be fun. So should Steep.", but praises the film's production with, "Production values are phenomenal."
