= Volant Spatula =

Type of ski

The Spatula was a ski manufactured by Volant skis from 2001 to 2003. It was the first production ski to feature reverse camber as well as reverse side cut. The ski was initially envisioned by professional freeskier Shane McConkey as early as 1996, and he convinced the company to manufacture the first prototypes in the summer of 2001. The Spatula gained a cult following, and along with its successor the K2 Pontoon (2006), inspired other ski manufacturers to experiment with a variety of camber shapes.

== Early history ==
McConkey was an early proponent of so-called "fat" skis, adopting the Volant Chubb, manufactured by his sponsor and with a 90 mm waist, as his everyday ski in the 1995–1996 season. That same year, McConkey came up with the concept for the Spatula at a bar in Argentina and sketched the first design onto a beer napkin, believing that a "fat" ski with reverse side-cut would provide additional floatation underfoot where the skier needed it the most. He eventually deemed this the "pool cover" phenomenon, since his theory was that taking a ski into powder snow was like running across a pool cover, where the skier's weight sinks the ski while the surrounding snow floats it. His friends mostly thought the concept was crazy, but McConkey retained the napkin and stored it in a file.

Approximately two years later in 1998, Volant engineer Peter Turner was skiing with McConkey and several others (such as Matchstick Productions filmmaker Scott Gaffney) with some prototype Volant skis that were variations of what was to become McConkey's signature ski: the Volant Machete McH "Huckster," which is itself similar to the earlier Chubb. These skis were generally variations of a "fat" shaped ski. Eventually the group realized that some de-cambered Chubbs bent upward at the tips and tails skied better in the fresh powder than any of the new prototypes did. McConkey credited Gaffney as saying, "I think my old, dead, decambered Chubbs float much better in the powder than those ones with new ski life or camber." Gaffney's assertion prompted McConkey to locate his bar napkin from 1996, and ponder the concept again, considering that powder is similar to water. Since water skis and surfboards have reverse side cut and reverse camber (also known as rocker), McConkey was more assured that a dedicated powder ski should have a similar shape.

McConkey spent the next two years talking to people about his reverse side cut and reverse camber ski, but most people rejected the notion outright except for Gaffney, fellow professional skier JT Holmes, and a few others.

== Concept skis ==
In 2000, McConkey finally started talking to the designers at Volant about his reverse/reverse concept, bringing Turner his notes that included a page of surfboard reviews. Turner and fellow Volant engineer Ryan Carroll were the only people interested in pursuing this concept with McConkey amidst a company financial crisis, so in the summer of 2001 they hand-built four pairs of concept Spatula skis in their spare time at the original Volant factory in Wheat Ridge, Colorado. The prototypes were much lighter than the production skis. These concept Spatulas featured the full stainless steel cap that Volant was known for, with the stainless steel extending down the sidewalls to the ski's edge. The prototypes are reported to measure, in width, 125 mm at the tip, 130 mm at the waist, and 120 mm at the tail, which is slightly wider than the production ski.

McConkey took possession of the first prototype in August of 2001 and flew to New Zealand with them for a film project. While other professional skiers flailed in the wet heavy snow, McConkey reported enthusiastically back to Turner how well the ski performed. Turner filed a provisional patent for the Spatula under his, Carroll's, and McConkey's names.

Although McConkey filmed a segment for the ski movie Focused (2003) with a pair of waterskis mounted under alpine bindings, this was filmed after the prototypes were developed and after the production Spatula skis were available.

== Volant closure and acquisition by Atomic ==
By the time McConkey returned home from New Zealand, stocks buoyed by the tech industry had fallen. This became known as the dot-com bubble burst. While Volant was a ski manufacturer rather than a tech company, Volant's chief funder, Mike Markkula, had been an executive for Apple Computer. With the financial downturn of tech stocks, Markkula decided to close the factory by the end of August, 2001. Volant's intellectual property was acquired by Gen-X Sports, a Canadian company, the following month. Gen-X Sports had previously purchased Volant's Limited Snowboards line in 1999. Gen-X Sports contracted Volant production with Atomic, which continued the Volant brand at its Austrian manufacturing facility.

McConkey kept three pairs of the prototype "V1" Spatulas, Carroll kept a single ski, and the other single ski went on tour with Volant to potentially promote the Spatula concept. At some point, one of the prototype Spatulas was given to Larry's Bootfitting in Boulder, Colorado, where it was displayed to the public with a signed message from McConkey directed toward the ski industry. However, as of at least February, 2023, the ski is no longer present at that business. Per an employee, during the ownership transition from founder Larry Houchen to Charlene and Todd Hoffman and Elaine and Dan Vardamis in 2020, the McConkey-signed prototype Spatula was stolen.

In September of 2002, Huffy Corporation acquired Gen-X Sports, and with it Volant's intellectual property.

McConkey and Turner convinced Gen-X/Huffy to invest in an initial production run of the "V2" Spatula, which eliminated the full stainless steel cap in favor of an aluminum/fiberglass sidewall with a stainless steel top sheet. The "V2" sidewall became a feature of all subsequent Atomic-produced Volants. Atomic insisted on adding large amounts of fiberglass, which weighed the ski down, not understanding how steel worked in the original Volant skis that negated the need for structural fiberglass layers. The production ski was also stiffer in the tail than the prototypes to balance it and prevent excessive "wheelie" behavior of an overbending tail. The first batch of 300 skis was produced in October of 2002 for the 2002–2003 ski season. Marketing literature from 2002 show photos of the "V1" prototype Spatula featuring an image of a long-handled grill spatula rather than the production ski displaying a pat of melted butter as the graphic. Prior to full production, another pre-production prototype Spatula with the V2 sidewall was made with an orange butter decal rather than yellow, and the tip itself featured a red/white stylized "V" emblem that was used on other production Volant skis such as the Gravity 68, rather than the black/red "V" used on the Machete line.

According to Ivor Allsop, a ski industry sales rep, the initial 300-ski production run may have simply been the initial delivery, as the minimum quantity for any major European ski manufacturer was 1000 skis. The next portion of the production was likely 700 skis, although many of those may not have been delivered to North America. In the spring of 2003, Allsop purchased the remaining 530 pairs from Atomic after having sold 60 pairs from Gen-X sports. Allsop, a resident of Utah, had two pallets of Spatula sks in his garage and would ship McConkey 20 pairs at a time for McConkey to sell at cost. Allsop distributed through Dave Steiner at what is now Palisades Tahoe, and Andy Gardner at Alta. The rest of the Spatulas he sold on eBay, taking approximately 18 months to liquidate them all due to the relative unpopularity.

The Spatula appeared in its final form in marketing literature in 2003 for the 2003–2004 season. That literature advertises a 186 cm Spatula. However, Volant did produce a few 172 cm Spatulas for the 2003 trade shows that were intended for smaller skiers and for women. These skis do not appear in any advertising, but occasionally appear in the marketplace.

Amer Group Plc., which owns Atomic, purchased Volant in December of 2003 from Huffy Corporation, granting Atomic all of Volant's patents, trademarks, and intellectual property. In particular, this included the patents for using steel technology in Volant skis.

== Post-Volant ==
Atomic decided to radically change the marketing strategy for Volant. It ended Volant's relationship with Shane McConkey, turning Volant into a limited-production fashion ski brand marketed and distributed in Europe. Accordingly, McConkey's entire line of Volant Machete skis, which included the Spatula, was terminated. Volant shifted from a broad performance brand to a marketing strategy based upon quality and luxury limited to on-piste use, joining forces with luxury brands such as Goldbergh.

McConkey wanted to build the next generation of the Spatula when he lost Volant's support and moved to K2, where he ultimately designed the K2 Pontoon to avoid future patent infringement. In private conversations, McConkey confided in Turner that the Pontoon was not nearly as good as the Spatula.

Peter Turner went on to co-found the ski company Drake PowderworkS, better known as DPS, and discussed ways of improving on the Spatula design with McConkey, including by adding a small amount of side cut underfoot to give the ski controllability in hard snow or in risky conditions such as a ridge line traverse or the top of a snow chute. Turner designed these attributes into the DPS Lotus 138. McConkey told Turner that DPS did a good job with that design.

Although Atomic maintained Volant's existing intellectual property rights for stainless steel skis, it did not pursue the patent for the Spatula itself. Atomic continues to manufacture Volant stainless steel skis as of November, 2023, but after retaining its own branding identity for nearly 20 years, the volantski.com domain started directing to atomic.com. Volant skis for the 2023–2024 season eliminated various images of a stylized "V", which had represented Volant since its inception, replacing it with the Atomic image and adding the word Atomic to the skis for the first time.

== Rarity and value ==
With approximately 1000 Spatula pairs produced, the ski is relatively rare. Additionally, it did not sell well to the public, who was skeptical about a ski that was intended only for deep powder; numerous professional ski reviewers reflected this animosity. Many Spatulas were sold at season-end discounts. However, the ski eventually caught on and sparked a revolution in the ski industry, which incorporated greater width and rocker that is seen on skis throughout North American ski resorts and those skis used by backcountry ski enthusiasts since the mid-2000s. With McConkey's death in 2009 and the ski's unique properties due to its shape and its stainless steel construction, the Spatula's popularity has only increased. An eBay listing for a new pair of Spatula skis in their factory wrapper purportedly sold for the $3,200 asking price in 2018, followed by another new pair sold on eBay for $3,500 in 2023. Used versions sell for far less when they come on the market, but demand for Spatula skis remains high even though the ski is over 20 years old.

== See also ==
- Ski geometry
