= Jamie Pierre =

American professional freeskier

Matthew Jamison "Jamie" Pierre (February 22, 1973 – November 13, 2011) was a professional free skier. In 2006, Pierre set a world-record cliff jump of 255 feet (78 m) at the Grand Targhee Resort in Wyoming. He skied away with a bleeding cut lip from being hit by a shovel when his partners dug him out of his 12-foot bomb hole. Google's Sergey Brin had estimated that Pierre was almost at terminal velocity when he hit the ground. Pierre died in November 2011 in an avalanche.

== Life ==
Matthew Jamison Pierre was born February 22, 1973. According to the London Daily Telegraph, out of eight children, Jamie was third; he was born a son of Pam and Gerard Pierre. Jamie started skiing at age ten at Buck Hill, Minnesota, and quickly picked up the craving for more. He graduated high school and decided to live life as a "skibum". Jamie worked menial jobs to pay for his expensive passion at various resorts with his brother, Chris Pierre. In 1995, he was able to enter an extreme skiing competition, the beginning to many adventures. Jamie Pierre spent the next ten years progressing his skiing and the size of cliffs he jumped. However, at age 32 in 2005 he got married and had a daughter. Pierre decided, "The plan is to ski more, fall out of the sky less".

== Film career ==
Being one of a small few skiers known for going big, Pierre played a key role in several major ski films of his time. This work included parts in many different film companies, including Warren Miller, Teton Gravity Research, Matchstick Productions Flying Circus and Rage Films. While working for Warren Miller, Pierre took parts in five movies: Cold Fusion in 2001, Journey in 2003, Off the Grid in 2006, Playground in 2007 and Children of Winter in 2008.

== World Record Huck ==
Jamie Pierre was known for pushing the limits of skiing off cliffs. He began to be followed by the media in 1999 when a black and white photo appeared in Powder Magazine of Pierre leaping off a forty-foot cliff. The size of the cliffs he was jumping from were increasing quickly, starting at 50 feet, and soon were up to 90 feet. His first 100 footers were off of crags in Utah. In 2003, Jamie Pierre jumped off a 165 foot cliff in Wolverine Cirque Utah. In Engelberg, Switzerland he cleared a 185-foot cliff around March 2004. Pierre wanted to surpass the cliff jumping height record at the time, 225 feet. After scoping many cliffs, he chose a 255 footer in the backcountry of Grand Targhee resort. He accomplished the world record feat in front of dozens of spectators on January 25, 2006, plunging headfirst into the snow upon landing and having to be extricated by friends. In 2008, Fred Syversen surpassed Jamie's record by surviving a 351-foot cliff, albeit unintentionally.

== Death ==
On November 13, 2011, Jamie Pierre was hiking at Snowbird Resort in Utah to ski some early season snow. The resort was not open and no avalanche control had been done. Pierre and his friend, Jack Pilot, were planning to ski the area known as South Chute. He triggered an avalanche that rolled him over rocks for 800 feet. According to The New York Times, "He came to a stop partly buried and died of trauma". He is survived by his wife, and two children, a daughter and a son.
