= Ultimate Rush =

2011/2012 documentary television series

- Genre: Extreme Sports
- Written by: Stephen Schiff Neil Cole
- Narrated by: Nick Nolte Sean Phillips
- Countries of origin: France, United States, Japan, Canada, Germany, Morocco, Bolivia, Brazil, Argentina, Zambia, Japan, India, Thailand, Norway, Netherlands, New Zealand, Island, Israel
- Original languages: English, German
- No. of episodes: 50

Production
- Executive producers: Gabor Harrach, Philipp Manderla, Stephen Schiff
- Producers: Murray Wais, Steve Winter
- Running time: 24 minutes
- Production companies: Red Bull Media House GmbH, Matchstick Productions

Original release
- Network: Servus TV
- Release: December 23, 2011

Ultimate Rush is a 2011/2012 documentary television series produced by the Red Bull Media House in association with Matchstick Productions. It is also marketed as a combination of stupendous action sports endeavour, coupled with a cinematic-approach to storytelling. Through its wide distribution in the United States, the United Kingdom, Brazil, Denmark, Austria and other territories, the series is evidence of the acceptance of extreme sports into mainstream television, and one of the most complete accounts thereof. The series focuses on the outrageous exploits of some of the best athletes in the world, and how they explore the fine line between extreme sports, philosophy and art. Most of the filming was conducted in the rugged backcountry of British Columbia, Alaska, the Rocky Mountains, the French Alps, the Himalayas and the Andes, but not at official events or secured sites.

Seasons 1-3 of Ultimate Rush was written and co-executive produced by Pulitzer Prize-nominee and Hollywood screenwriter Stephen Schiff, whose other works include the films Wall Street: Money Never Sleeps, True Crime, The Deep End of the Ocean and Lolita.

The 20 episodes of Season 1, Ultimate Rush were directed by Murray Wais and Steve Winter. The narration was provided by the well-known veteran Hollywood actor, and three-time Academy Award-nominee, Nick Nolte. The series documented the exploits of several high-profile extreme sports stars including Chris Davenport, Hervé Cerutti, Steve Fisher - and the late, Antoine Montant and Shane McConkey.

Following the success of Season 1, Seasons 2-5 of Ultimate Rush featured narration by talented voice over actor, Sean Phillips, known also for his TV commercial and movie promo work, as well as several video game characters. With these subsequent seasons, Ultimate Rush went to even greater lengths to show audiences the thrills, dangers and colorful personalities of the extreme sports world.

== Broadcast ==
Ultimate Rush premiered in December 2011 in German-speaking territories on Servus TV. The English-language version premiered in the United States on August 23, 2012 on Halogen TV, and was subsequently released on iTunes.

== Episodes ==
=== 1. "Speed Riding" ===
Antoine Montant, Francois Bon, and Hervé Cerutti aspire to integrate climbing, flying, and skiing in the sport of Speed Riding. The athletes challenge the mountains of the French Alps near Chamonix. Antoine, named the fastest speed rider, encounters an avalanche. The three athletes attempt to conquer one of the most famous and dangerous walls in the Alps. Antoine then takes on a riskier line and tempts his fate.

Episode Cast: Antoine Montant, Francois Bon, and Hervé Cerutti

=== 2. "Scoping the Line" ===
In this episode, athletes seek extreme landscapes in search of a 'Perfect Line'. Skiers scope out steep mountain faces while kayakers see monumental waterfalls, bikers dense forests and base jumpers an abundant stretch of sky.

Episode Cast: Kaj Zackrisson, Wade Simmons, Steve Fisher, Espin Fadnes, Cody Townsend, Mark Abma,

=== 3. "Epic Pow" ===
Professional skiers James Heim, Mark Abma, and Eric 'Hoji' Hjorleifson go ski touring in search of big mountain backcountry powder they call 'Epic Pow.' With bare necessities the athletes survive in huts of the British Columbia mountains. They ski a variety of terrain including pillow features and spine zones.

Episode Cast: James Heim, Mark Abma, Eric Hjorleifson

=== 4. "Eric's Ski Quest" ===
Professional freeskiers Eric Hjorleifson, James Heim, and Ingrid Backstrom seek a vast isolated landscape just northwest of Whistler, British Columbia. The Meager Group offers insane possibilities with amazing spine lines. The team sets up a base camp near the hot springs. They wait out the weather hoping for a perfect day. Eric experiences the extremes of glory and pain in the line of his life.

Episode Cast: Eric Hjorleifson, James Heim, Ingrid Backstrom,

=== 5. "The Red Line" ===
Extreme skiing is defined with bigger lines, bigger mountains, and steeper faces. They say, "You fall, you die." Professional skiers Chris Davenport and Stian Hagen sit down with the pioneer of extreme skiing Sylvain Saudan. The athletes share the truth they gain by using big mountains to peer into the depths of themselves. Chris and Stian ski the remote peaks of Alaska getting too close to 'the red line.'

Episode Cast: Chris Davenport, Stian Hagen, Sylvain Saudan

=== 6. "Haines" ===
Haines, Alaska for professional skiers is considered The Dream Trip. Big mountain skiers Daron Rahlves and Henrik Windstedt challenge their skills when they decide to run a line together. Ingrid Backstrom, JT Holmes, and Shane McConkey face dangerous weather when they arrive in Haines. Mark Abma and Eric Hjorleifson lead the young talent of Sean Petit on a first time heli trip.

Episode Cast: Daron Rahlves, Henrik Windstedt, Ingrid Backstrom, JT Holmes, Shane McConkey, Mark Abma, Eric Hjorleifson, Sean Pettit

=== 7. "History of Ski Base" ===
JT Holmes and Shane McConkey share the dream of combining skiing and base-jumping. They find themselves in Bella Coola, BC where the primary objective is to go where no one has ever considered by skiing the 'closeout line'. They then take on Europe's most iconic peak, the Eiger. In the mountains of western Norway they ready themselves for a stunt that had never been attempted before, a wingsuit ski base.

Episode Cast: J.T. Holmes, Shane McConkey

=== 8. "Kayak the World" ===
Steve Fisher leads an all-star team of kayakers as they venture into unfamiliar territory. They first travel to remote Iceland and then to exotic Zambia. The team faces challenging rapids and falls between two of the most dangerous sites on earth.

Episode Cast: Steve Fisher, Ben Brown, Jared Meehan, Sam Drevo, Dale Jardine

=== 9. "MTB Stunts" ===
Three teams of world-class riders demonstrate new extremes of mountain biking. Industrious mountain bikers build obstacles through dense forests of British Columbia. Pro dirt jumps challenge the riders to new heights in New Zealand. Urban free riding brings on a new style when the riders find street lines in Amsterdam and Germany.

Episode Cast: Wade Simmons, Robbie Bourdon, Cameron Zink, Dave Watson, Aaron Chase, John Cowan

=== 10. "MTB the Middle East" ===
Professional mountain bikers take a road trip through the diverse landscapes of Israel. Fabien Barel gets a rush of adrenaline on a steep line through unexpected terrain. Cedric Gracia finds an ultimate road gap on Mount Sodom.

Episode Cast: Ben Boyko, Fabien Barel, Brian Lopes, Wayne Goss, Aaron Chase, Robbie Bourdon, Cedric Garcia

=== 11. "Steve Fisher" ===
South African Steve Fisher, world's best all-around kayaker and his right-hand man, Ben Brown, travel to Sogndal, Norway then to Thailand where they add a new member to the team, Eric Southwick. They soon find that the waters of Thailand prove more treacherous than they could have anticipated.

Episode Cast: Ben Brown, Steve Fisher, Shane Raw, Eric Southwick

=== 12. "Magic Days" ===
A search for the perfect day can become a waiting game when elements do not align, but when they do, the best professional skiers can make miracles happen - magic days, or perfect disasters. Bobby Brown pushes his luck when he travels to the Alps, then Cody Townsend takes advantage of the perfect day in Terrace, British Columbia.

Episode Cast: Bobby Brown, Henrik Winstedt, Cody Townsend, Russ Henshaw, Gus Kenworthy, Kaj Kackrisson

=== 13. "Progression of Freestyle" ===
In the incredibly exciting world of freestyle skiing, progression raises the bar for this extreme sport. The foursome that calls itself The New Canadian Airforce, full of some of the most daring athletes, breaks away from traditional skiing to showcase what is possible on a pair of skis. A look inside the creative world of riding rails and innovating rotations some of the best athletes bring the progression of freestyle to a whole new level.

Episode Cast: Alex Kufman, Bobby Brown, Colby West, Gus Kenworthy, Jon Olsson, Bear Bryand, Mike Rogge, Jay Scambio, Richard Permin

=== 14. "Bralorne" ===
Rory Bushfield, James Heim, Eric Hjorleifson, Mark Abma, and Sean Pettit; some of the world's best skiers travel to Bralorne, British Columbia where they find an abundance of lofty peaks full of zones to study and ski. The weather gets in a sulky mood, but after the skies open up, it's showtime. Eric finds a line that epitomizes the discovery of the funny little mining town, Bralorne.

Episode Cast: Rory Bushfield, James Heim, Eric Hjorleifson, Mark Abma, Sean Pettit

=== 15. "Cedric Gracia" ===
Cedric Gracia explodes into the professional world of mountain biking. Excelling in free riding, downhill, and four-cross; he blends the styles together in pursuit of a new vision for mountain biking. With high energy and a fun attitude, Cedric races against his good friend, Steve Peat, in the World Cup. He then takes a team to Bolivia where extreme elements put them to the test. Cedric risks his life on a massive line that starts at the top of the world.

Episode Cast: Cedric Gracia, Steve Peat, Dave Watson, Robbie Bourdon, Carlin Dunn,

=== 16. "Teacher and Apprentice" ===
For mountain bikers to reach new levels, knowledge is continually passed along from one great rider to the next. Legendary rider, John Cowan travels to Ilha Bela, a small island in Brazil, to mentor a skilled new member of his professional team, Paul Basagoitia. Robbie Bourdon, a big-air veteran, also develops a mentoring relationship as the team of talented riders travel to Argentina. The team pushes into their unknown ability when the students begin to rival the masters.

Episode Cast: John Cowan, Paul Basagoitia, Robbie Bourdon, Grant Fielder, Carlin Dunn, Andreo Lacondeguy, Dave Watson, Fabien Barel, Luise Lacondeguy

=== 17. "Wingsuit" ===
The sport of BASE jumping progresses when jumpers become more and more audacious turning skydiving into a world-class sport. Laws in the United States do not stop enthusiasts, Shane McConky, JT Holmes, and Miles Daisher from risking their lives as they travel to Norway to learn from the best and push their limits in the Isterdalen Valley.

Episode Cast: Shane McConkey, J.T. Holmes, Miles Daisher, Espen Fadnes, Andreas Barkhall, Hans Holmefjord, Tom Erik Heimen

=== 18. "MTB US" ===
With some of the most challenging terrain on Earth being in the United States, two crews of world-class mountain bikers are sent out to create their own. The first crew travels from the Black Hills of South Dakota to Lake Alcova, Wyoming exploring exotic dirt terrain. Meanwhile, crew number two tours Northern New England on motorcycles to find challenging dirt jumps near Laconia, New Hampshire. Both crews learn that if you search hard enough, what's born in the USA is the Ultimate Rush.

Episode Cast: Kurtis Sorge, Robbie Bourdon, Cameron Zink, Wayne Goss, Paul Basagoitia, Dave Smutak, Aaron Chase, Adam Hauck, Chris Van Dine

=== 19. "Ends of the Earth" ===
Some of the world's best skiers are followed to some of the world's best kept secrets- Kashmir, India and Hokkaido, Japan. Mark Abma and Mike Wilson spend time at India's tiny resort of Gulmarg where they explore the grandest mountain range in the world, the Himalayas. Meanwhile, Sean Pettit, Jacob Wester, and Henrik Windstedt experience Japan's never-ending powder and magnificent tree skiing where they claim some of their best days.

Episode Cast: Mark Abma, Mike Wilson, Sean Pettit, Jacob Wester, Henrik Windstedt, Mike Douglas

=== 20. "Wakeboard" ===
Two of the greatest wakeboarders, Adam Errington and Parks Bonifay, take a road trip together, showcasing and filming their wakeboarding skills in some of the most spectacular locations in America. First, it's off to Washington's Radar Lake - a wakeboarding Mecca, then to Lake Powell with pro wakeboarder, Danny Harf. They create astonishing moments on the most beautiful bodies of water in America as new settings raise athletes to greater heights.

Episode Cast: Adam Errington, Parks Bonifay, Danny Harf, Tony Smith
