= Ingrid Backstrom =

American skier

Ingrid Backstrom (born August 21, 1978) is an internationally ranked professional skier from Seattle, Washington, United States. Backstrom graduated from Highline High School in Burien, Washington as a straight-A student, three-sport varsity athlete, and co-valedictorian. In 2000, Backstrom graduated from Whitman College in Walla Walla, Washington with a Bachelor of Arts in Geology. Her brother, Arne Backstrom, died in a skiing accident in 2010 at the age of 29.

== Career ==
Backstrom established herself on the freeskiing scene through her performances in Matchstick Production's 2004 Yearbook and 2005 The Hit List. Since then she has been featured in several other ski films, including Warren Miller's Impact (2004), Mark Obenhaus's Steep (2007) Matchstick Production's Seven Sunny Days (2007), Claim (2008), In Deep (2009), The Way I See It (2010), G.N.A.R. (2011), Attack of La Nina (2011), and Superheroes of Stoke (2012).

Backstrom was the only female to be featured as one of Powder Magazine's Future Big Mountain Heroes in 2002. She has gone on to win several other awards for her performances in ski films, including "Best Female Performance" and "Breakthrough Performance" at the 2005 Powder Magazine Video Awards.
