= Seth Morrison =

Seth Morrison may refer to:

- Seth Morrison (skier) (born 1973), American skier
- Seth Morrison (musician) (born 1988), American musician
