= John Nicoletta =

American extreme skier (1981–2008)

- Born: April 2, 1981; Westford, Massachusetts
- Died: April 11, 2008 (aged 27); Alyeska Resort
- Occupation: extreme skier

John Nicoletta (April 2, 1981 – April 11, 2008) was an extreme skier who died skiing while competing in the 2008 Subaru Freeskiing World Championships at the Alyeska Ski Resort in Girdwood, Alaska. Nicoletta was one of 70 men and 26 women in the event. The event had a purse of $12,500. Competitors earn points in the competition by making bold moves jumping off cliffs or zigzagging on tongues of snow through rock bands. John has a shrine dedicated to him at Aspen Mountain (ski area) John had placed second at the freeskiing championships in Telluride. John has been featured in a number of ski videos including “After the Drought: Adventures of a Colorado Snow Company”.
