= McConkey (film) =

- Starring: Shane McConkey; JT Holmes
- Production company: Matchstick Productions
- Distributed by: Red Bull Media House
- Release date: April 20, 2013 (Tribeca Film Festival)
- Running time: 90 minutes
- Country: United States
- Language: English

McConkey is a 2013 documentary film about extreme skier Shane McConkey. The film follows Shane from growing up as the son of skier Jim McConkey to his days as a professional freeskier. The film also focuses on Shane's 2009 death during a ski base jump and his continued influence over the sport of skiing. The film features interviews from notable athletes and friends of Shane such as JT Holmes, Tony Hawk and Travis Pastrana.
