= Volant =

Volant may refer to:

- Volant (heraldry), an attitude of heraldry, a position of a bird emblazoned as a charge, supporter or crest
- Flying and gliding animals
- Volant skis, a U.S. ski manufacturer
- Volant, Pennsylvania, a small town
