= Aspen Extreme =

1993 American film by Patrick Hasburgh

- Theatrical release poster
- Directed by: Patrick Hasburgh
- Written by: Patrick Hasburgh
- Produced by: Fred T. Gallo; Leonard Goldberg
- Starring: Paul Gross; Peter Berg; Finola Hughes; Teri Polo
- Cinematography: Steven Fierberg; Robert Primes
- Edited by: Steven Kemper
- Music by: Michael Convertino
- Production company: Hollywood Pictures
- Distributed by: Buena Vista Pictures Distribution
- Release date: January 22, 1993
- Running time: 113 minutes
- Country: United States
- Language: English
- Budget: $10-14 million
- Box office: $8 million

Aspen Extreme is a 1993 American drama film written and directed by Patrick Hasburgh. The plot is about two ski buddies, T.J. Burke (Paul Gross) and Dexter Rutecki (Peter Berg), who move from Brighton, Michigan to Aspen, Colorado to seek a better life. The two friends quickly become Aspen ski instructors, but women, drugs, and job troubles threaten to destroy their relationship. Along the way, TJ tries to realize his dream of becoming a professional writer, and the pair train for the upcoming Powder 8 ski competition.

The supporting cast includes Finola Hughes, Teri Polo, William Russ, and Trevor Eve. The cover of the American video release quotes the Seattle Times as referring to the film as "Top Gun on the Ski Slopes."

== Plot ==
T.J. Burke tires of his auto assembly worker job in Detroit, quits, and convinces his friend Dexter Rutecki to move with him to Aspen. After succeeding in the new instructor tryouts for the Aspen Ski School, they both become ski instructors, although T.J. secretly intercedes on Dexter's behalf. While T.J. advances to become the most popular instructor of the school during the season, he has to constantly watch out for Dexter, whose social skills are less honed and whose future is less bright. Along the way, they meet young local radio DJ Robin Hand as well as the rich cougar-ish Bryce Kellogg, who selects the most desirable new instructor each year for her latest plaything.

After watching the famous Aspen Powder 8 competition, T.J. and Dexter agree to team up to try to win the next season's award. While skiing out of bounds, T.J. falls into a large sinkhole in the snow, plunging many feet into a stream. Dexter rescues him, and because skiing out of bounds would get them fired, takes him to Robin's house so she can patch him up without notifying the ski school director.

Meanwhile having felt abandoned by T.J and feeling resentment towards him, Dexter falls into depression and turns to alcohol and drugs to cope. But with the help of an intervening Robin, Dexter gets clean and gets his head on straight.

After spending some interminable and unsatisfying time with Bryce, T.J. and Dexter awkwardly rekindle their friendship and reset their goal to win the Powder 8 competition. Dexter tells T.J. that he plans to move back to Detroit and try to get T.J.'s old job on the auto assembly line, but that he'd like to win the Powder 8 competition first. T.J. and Dexter decide to ski out of bounds in order to train for the upcoming event. While skiing outside the boundaries of Aspen, T.J. and Dexter set off an avalanche. Dexter suffers a tragic demise, while T.J. escapes with minor injuries. Later, in deep depression, T.J. comes to realize how his relationship with Bryce had no particular meaning, and writes of his and Dexter's friendship. The article is published in a major ski magazine, finally providing T.J. with some satisfaction for his writing efforts after many prior rejections. His friendship with Robin also reawakens, as they both mourn Dexter's loss.

T.J. is sought out by a newly hired young ski instructor to be his partner in the Powder 8. They win the competition, beating T.J.'s nemesis throughout the movie. The victory is bittersweet, as he remembers the dream that he and Dexter had of winning the Powder 8, and in the end, he and Robin reconcile as he finally reveals that he loves her.

== Cast ==
- Paul Gross as T.J. Burke
- Peter Berg as Dexter Rutecki
- Finola Hughes as Bryce Kellogg
- Teri Polo as Robin Hand
- William Russ as Dave Ritchie
- Trevor Eve as Karl Stall
- Martin Kemp as Franz Houser
- Stewart Finlay McLennan as Rudy Zucker
- Tony Griffin as Gary Eimiller
- Julie Royer as Michelle Proux
- Patrick T. Johnson as Bill Swanson
- William McNamara as Todd Pounds
- Gary Eimiller as Jinx Stone
- Stan Ivar as Mr. Parker
- David Boreanaz as Spectator (uncredited)
- Karla Souza as Kimberly
- Nicolette Scorsese as Tina

== Production ==
Writer and debut director Patrick Hasburgh developed the screenplay for Aspen Extreme based on his experiences working as a ski instructor in Aspen, Colorado where among his pupils was Walt Disney Pictures chairman, Michael Eisner, who later agreed to distribute the picture through Disney’s Buena Vista Pictures Distribution, Inc.

Principal photography began in March 1992 with filming in Aspen and other skiing communities, such as Snowmass, Ajax, Highlands, and Buttermilk, with additional shooting at the Ford Truck Plant in Wayne, Michigan, the Mt. Brighton ski area, and the surrounding suburbs. Avalanche and rescue scenes were filmed over four days on a sound stage in North Hollywood, CA.

== Skiing footage ==
The backcountry and bowl skiing sequences were filmed at Aspen Highlands with the permission of owner Whip Jones and Alta Ski Area. Big mountain extreme skiers Scot Schmidt and Doug Coombs (and several others) are credited as (stand-in) skiers.

== Reception ==
Aspen Extreme received negative reviews from critics and holds a 22% rating on Rotten Tomatoes.

=== Critical response ===
Vincent Canby of The New York Times wrote: "Even though it runs close to two hours, "Aspen Extreme" remains sort of stretched out and dramatically undeveloped."

== Controversy ==
The film’s release coincided with the Boycott Colorado movement following the passage of 1992 Colorado Amendment 2, which prohibited civil rights legislation for homosexuals and bisexuals. It was suggested the film was likely to cause controversy due to prominent product placement from the “right-wing” Colorado-based company Coors.
