= Teton Gravity Research =

American extreme sports media company

- Type: Multi-media company
- Industry: Action sports
- Founders: Steve Jones, Todd Jones, Dirk Collins, Rick Armstrong, Corey Gavitt
- Headquarters: Jackson Hole, WY, USA
- Products: advertisements, product promotionals, online media, consumer products, action sports films, live events
- Services: advertising, marketing, brand placement, cinematography, production of commercial television, film, and custom digital content
- Website: http://www.tetongravity.com

Teton Gravity Research (TGR) is an extreme sports media and apparel company based in Jackson Hole, Wyoming. The company was founded in 1996 by brothers Steve and Todd Jones, as well as friends Dirk Collins, Rick Armstrong, and Corey Gavitt. The group launched the company to create products that came from the perspective of athletes, showcased youth culture, and fostered the growth of high-risk action sports.

== Athletes ==
TGR productions have included notable athletes such as Kai Jones, Doug Coombs, Jeremy Jones, Tommy Moe, Rick Armstrong, Micah Black, Tanner Hall, J.P. Auclair, Travis Rice, Tim Durtschi, Sammy Carlson, Xavier De Le Rue, and Terje Haakonsen.

== Films ==
TGR has produced 40 award-winning action sports films rooted in skiing, snowboarding and surfing, and numerous original television broadcast series.

TGR is largely known for its Deeper, Further, Higher film trilogy, which continues TGR's focus on high-injury-risk extreme alpine sports. These three films showcase Jeremy Jones, who is a 10-time Snowboarder magazine "Big Mountain Rider of the Year" and the younger brother of TGR co-founders Steve and Todd Jones. Jeremy Jones revolutionized backcountry snowboarding with Deeper, his 2010 ode to splitboarding and human-powered adventure. His 2012 sequel Further took him to the planet's most remote mountain ranges and earned him a nod as a 2013 National Geographic 'Adventurer of the Year'. His environmental advocacy work with Protect Our Winters won him recognition as one of President Barack Obama's 2013 'Champions of Change'. TGR released Higher in September 2014, which was filmed on location in Alaska, Wyoming, California, Massachusetts, and Nepal.

== Production technology ==
In April 2013, TGR became the official launch partner for the GSS C520, a camera platform which co-founder Todd Jones described as, "the most advanced portable gyro stabilized system in the world." TGR produced a reel using footage the company shot while first using the GSS C520, which was recognized as a "Vimeo Staff Pick."

== Online community ==
TGR markets to millions of people each year through its online platform, tetongravity.com. In addition to featuring TGR's athletes and films, the website offers advertising and editorial content, as well as extreme sports videos, stories, and photos contributed by community members.

== Merchandise ==
TGR created a line of clothing rooted in youth culture and lifestyle of the extreme-sports athlete.

== Commercial productions ==
TGR has produced national television commercials for brands such as Apple, Nissan, Jeep, Under Armour, Energizer and The North Face. TGR's creative direction, cinematography, early adoption of new technology, and experience filming in remote and extreme environments have made the company known for creating action-sports content, especially via aerial cinematography.

== Awards ==
=== The Co-Lab ===
On September 21, 2013, TGR awarded the largest cash prize in skiing history, $100,000, to Dale Talkington as the first-ever winner of The Co-Lab, an open source video contest in which skiers from around the world submitted video edits and fans voted online to determine the finalists. Dale Talkington's fellow finalists voted and Talkington was determined to be the winner.

== Environmental advocacy ==
TGR is known for producing action-sports films with environmental messages. The company is a key partner of 1% For The Planet and a member of Business for Innovative Climate & Energy Policy (BICEP), the Surfrider Foundation, and Protect Our Winters (which additionally was founded by TGR athlete Jeremy Jones.).

== Filmography ==
- "The Continuum" - 1996 - ski film
- "Harvest" - 1997 - ski film
- "Uprising" - 1998 - ski film
- "The Realm" - 1999 - ski film
- "Area 51" - 1999 - ski film
- "Further" - 2000 - ski film
- "Los Alamos" - 2000 - ski film
- "Mind the Addiction" - 2001 - ski film
- "Subject To Change" - 2001 - ski film
- "Gondwana" - 2001 - surf film
- "The Prophecy" -2002 - ski film
- "Salad Days" - 2002 - ski film
- "High Life" - 2003 - ski film
- "Soul Purpose" - 2004 - ski film
- "Tangerine Dream" - 2005 - ski film
- "Anomaly" - 2006 - ski film
- "The Big One" -2006 - ski film
- "Shack Therapy" - 2006 - surf film
- "Lost and Found" - 2007 - ski film
- "Under the Influence" - 2008 - ski film
- "Out There" - 2008 - surf film
- "Re:Session" - 2009 - ski film
- "Generations"- 2009 - ski film
- "Deeper" - 2010 - snowboard film
- "Light the Wick" - 2010 - ski film
- "One for the Road" - 2011 - ski film
- "The Dream Factory" - 2012 - ski film
- "Further" - 2012 - snowboard film
- "Way of Life" - 2013 - ski film
- "The Co-Lab" - 2013 - ski film
- "Almost Ablaze" - 2014 - ski film
- "Higher" - 2014 - snowboard film
- "unReal" - 2015 - bike film
- "Paradise Waits" - 2015 - ski film
- "For Lack of Better" - 2015 - ski film
- "Tight Loose" - 2016 - ski film
- "Proximity" - 2017 - surf film
- "Rogue Elements" - 2017 - ski film
- "Life of Glide" - 2017 - snowboard film
- "Andy Irons: Kissed by God" - 2018 - surf film
- "Far Out" - 2018 - ski film
- "Mountain in the Hallway" - 2018 - rock climb film
- "Ode to Muir" - 2018 - snowboard film
- "Roadless" - 2019 - snowboard film
- "Winterland" - 2019 - ski film
- "Fire on the Mountain" - 2019 - ski film
- "Lindsey Vonn: The Final Season" - 2019
- "Accomplice" - 2020 - bike film
- "Make Believe" - 2020 - ski film

== Television ==
Since its inception, TGR has produced television series for a range of networks and companies including NBC, Outside Television, Showtime, CarbonTV and Fuel TV. The company has also provided stock footage for clients including Red Bull Media House, The Weather Channel, Michelob, Apple, and HBO.

On March 5, 2014, Jeremy Jones and Teton Gravity Research were featured in an episode of 60 Minutes Sports.
