= Chris Davenport =

American skier and mountaineer

Personal information
- Full name: Christopher Davenport
- Nationality: American
- Born: January 4, 1971 (age 55) New Hampshire
- Education: University of Colorado Boulder

Sport
- Country: US
- Sport: big-mountain skiing ski mountaineer

Chris Davenport (born January 4, 1971) is considered one of the world's most accomplished big-mountain skiers and mountaineers. A native of Aspen, Colorado, he has been called "one of North America's top 25 skiers by Skiing Magazine and is a "two-time extreme skiing world champion".

== Background ==
A former alpine downhill racer at the Holderness School in New Hampshire and the University of Colorado Boulder, Davenport became involved in the big-mountain competition scene after graduation and went on to win the 1996 World Extreme Skiing Championships in Alaska. In 2000, he reached the podium in each Freeskiing World Tour event he participated in, and the next year he won his second World Championship at the 2001 Red Bull Snow Thrill of Alaska.

== Ski competition results ==
1996: World Extreme Skiing Champion
1996: 24 Hours of Aspen: 2nd
1996: New Zealand Heli Challenge Champion
1997: Jackson Hole Big Mountain Contest: 2nd
1998: ESPN X-Games Bronze Medal
1998: 24 Hours of Aspen Champion
2000: Canadian Freeskiing Championships – Blackcomb: 2nd
2000: NBC Gravity Games Big Mountain Contest: 2nd
2000: North American Freeskiing Championships – Snowbird: 3rd
2000: Red Bull Snowthrill of Alaska, IFSA World Freeskiing Champion
2000: Rip Curl Heli Challenge, New Zealand: 3rd (1st on Extreme day)
2001: Red Bull UltraCross Champion
2002: Powder Magazine Reader's Pole Award
2002: Red Bull Snowthrill of Alaska World Champion's Choice Award (with photographer Scott Markewitz)
2002: NEA Award Nominee (World Extreme Sports Awards)
2003: Voted one of Aspen's 100 Most Influential People, Sojourner Magazine
2003: Wild Dash for Cash Chinese Downhill Champion, Aspen
2004: Powder Magazine Reader's Poll Award
2005: Powder Magazine Reader's Poll Award
2005: Red Bull Hike and Ride Champion, Switzerland
2005: O'Neill Xtreme by Swatch Freeride Contest, 2nd Place, Verbier, Switzerland
2006: Powder Magazine Reader's Poll Award
2007: Everest Award Winner- Expedition of the Year (14ers)
2007: Red Bull Jungfrau Staffette Champion

== Ski Mountaineering Accomplishments ==
Davenport was the first person to ski all 54 of Colorado's peaks over 14,000 foot elevation in one year.

In 2015, Davenport, along with his two ski partners Ted and Christy Mahon, successfully climbed and skied the 100 highest peaks in Colorado.

Davenport was inducted into the United States Ski and Snowboard Hall of Fame as part of the class of 2014.

In 2017, he was inducted into the Colorado Snowsports Hall of Fame.

== Mount Everest ==
Davenport has been described as one of a "handful of skiers worldwide who climb Mt. Everest and other Himalayan peaks alpine style. They just clicked into their skis on the world's most dangerous slopes." In May, 2011, along with Neal Beidleman, Davenport skied 2000 feet of the Lhotse Face on Mount Everest, described as "one of just a handful of documented ski descents on the Lhotse Face". Professional mountain guides Davenport and Beidelman reached the summit of Mount Everest on May 20, 2011, along with client Ephi Gildor.

== Author ==
Davenport is an author of Ski the 14ers: A Visual Tribute to Colorado's 14,000-Foot Peaks from the Eyes of a Ski Mountaineer and 50 Classic Ski Descents of North America, and is a contributor to several ski publications.

== Media ==
Davenport has been featured in over twenty feature ski films, including those from Warren Miller Entertainment and Matchstick Productions. Chris is also a TV reporter and color commentator for ESPN, ABC Sports, and RSN TV.

Chris has been an announcer for ski racing at the Olympics and various World Cup events.

== See also ==
- Skiing Everest

== Bibliography ==
- Gonzalez, Erika (November 1, 2002). "Davenport: A Passion for the Real Aspen". Rocky Mountain News.
- "Australis: An Antarctic ski odyssey". A Davenport Mountainsport & Granite Films production. 2010. Archived from the original on April 25, 2012. "...has been featured in over twenty feature ski films, including those from Warren Miller Entertainment and Matchstick Productions."
- "The Internet Movie Database. Chris Davenport". IMDb.com, Inc. "Born: 1971 in Massachusetts, USA."
- "Announcing Warren Miller Entertainment's 62nd Film . . . Like There's No Tomorrow". Warren Miller. Archived from the original on November 22, 2011. "Join Chris Davenport....shot on location in Colorado, Utah, California, New Zealand, Chile, Alaska and British Columbia..."
