= Michelle Parker =

American skier (born 1987)

Michelle Parker (born April 10, 1987) is a pro-skier from Truckee, California, US. She started skiing in her home resort Squaw Valley Ski Resort. At the age of 15, she started dedicating herself to freeskiing. She has subsequently competed in the U.S. Freeskiing open, X-games and Red Bull Cold Rush.

Parker is one of the founders of S.A.F.E. A.S. (Skiers Advocating and Fostering Education for Avalanche and Snow Safety). The main goal for S.A.F.E A.S. is to heightening community snow safety and avalanche awareness we have created a women's intro to avalanche safety clinic.

== Career achievements ==
=== Competition results ===
- 2013: 3rd place: Red Bull Cold Rush, Silverton, US
- 2011: 3rd Place: Red Bull Cold Rush, Silverton, US
- 2009: 1st Place: Aspen Open, Aspen, US
- 2007: 2nd Place: US Freeskiing Open - Slopestyle, Copper Mountain, US
- 2006: 3rd Place: US Freeskiing Open - Slopestyle, Vail, US

=== Awards ===
- 2013: Best Female Performance, Powder Video Awards
- 2013: Best Female Performance, International Freeski Film Festival

== Filmography ==
- 2015: Matchstick Productions - Fade to Winter
- 2015: Matchstick Productions - Migrations
- 2014: Matchstick Productions - Days of my Youth
- 2014: Red Bull - The Faces of Dav
- 2013: Warren Miller - Like There's no Tomorrow
- 2013: Matchstick Productions - In Deep
- 2013: Matchstick Productions - Claim
- 2013: Poor Boyz Productions - Yeah Dude
- 2013: Poor Boyz Productions - Ski Porn
- 2012: Matchstick Productions - Superheroes of Stoke
- 2009: Matchstick Productions - In Deep

== Sponsors ==
- Red Bull
- Black Crows
- Mountain Hardware
- Anon
- Squaw Valley
- Arc'teryx
- Backcountry.com
- Arcade
- Kicker
