= Syversen =

Syversen is a Norwegian surname, originally a patronymic from the name Syver.

== Notable people ==
Notable people with this surname include:

- Fred Syversen (born 1966), Norwegian freeskier
- Hans Olav Syversen (born 1966), Norwegian politician
- Odd Syversen (born 1945), Norwegian ice hockey player
- Ole Fredrik Syversen (born 1971), Norwegian athlete
- Rolf Syversen (rower) (born 1948), Norwegian rower
- Rolf Syversen (musician) (1920–1987), Norwegian musician
