= Olympic Valley, California =

Unincorporated community in California, United States

Olympic Valley Squaw Valley
- Unincorporated community
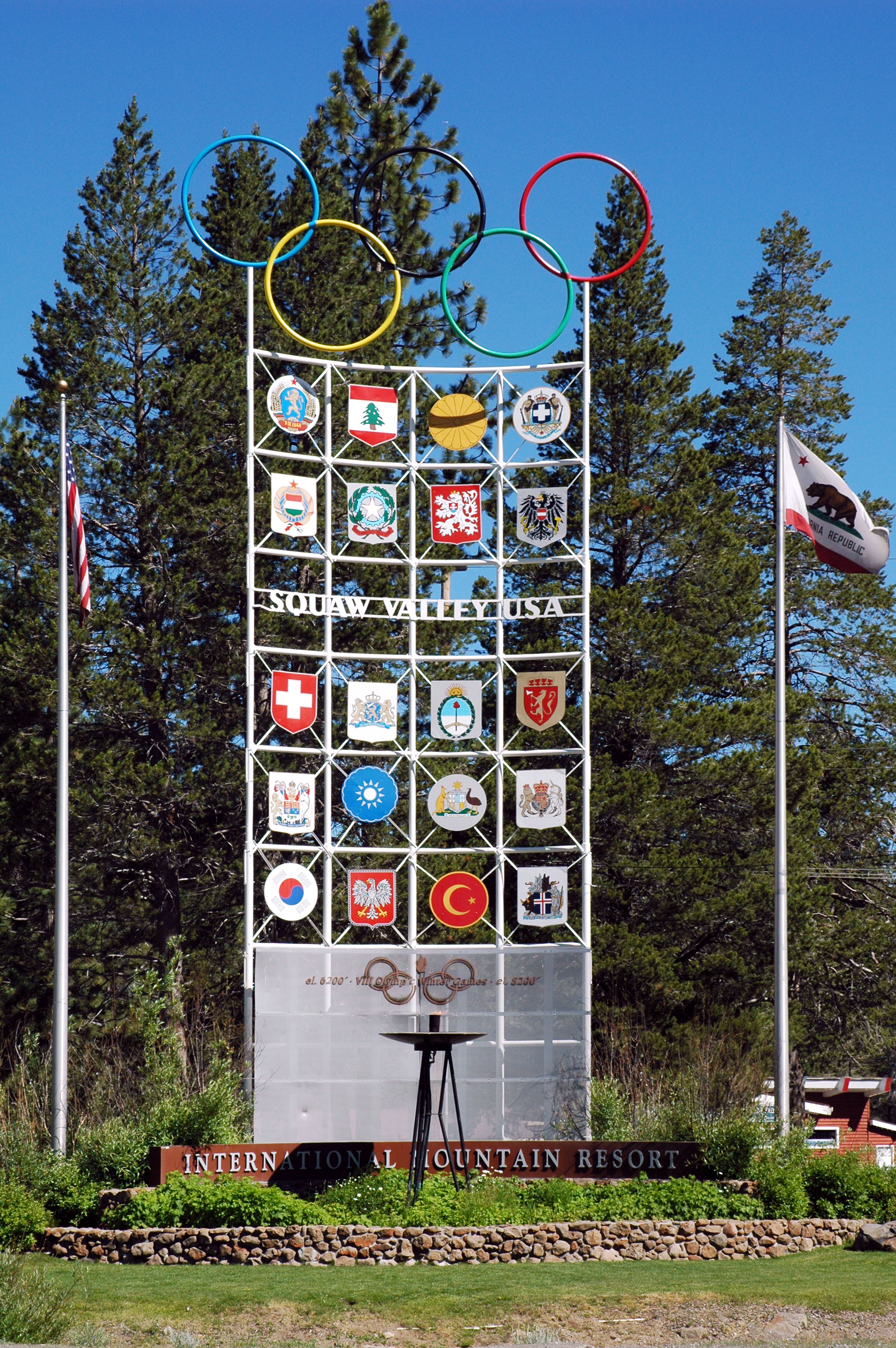
- Monument from the 1960 Winter Olympics at the entrance to Olympic Valley in 2011

- Location in California Olympic Valley (the United States)
- Coordinates: 39.19631°N 120.23356°W
- Country: United States
- State: California
- County: Placer

Population (2016)
  - Total: 823
  - Density: 39/sq mi (15/km^{2})
- Time zone: UTC-08:00 (Pacific)
  - Summer (DST): UTC-07:00 (Pacific)

Olympic Valley (historically and informally known as Squaw Valley) is an unincorporated community located in Placer County, California, United States. It lies northwest of Tahoe City along California State Highway 89 on the banks of the Truckee River near Lake Tahoe. It is home to Palisades Tahoe (formerly Squaw Valley Ski Resort), the site of the 1960 Winter Olympics. Olympic Valley is the smallest resort area to host the Olympic Winter Games.

== Name ==
When westward bound travelers first encountered the valley, they called it "Squaw Valley" because they saw only Washoe women and children, as most of the men were away hunting. The name "Squaw Valley" has become associated with the area's history as a skiing destination. However, the local Washoe tribe advocated for the removal of "squaw", a term previously used for Native women that is today considered an ethnic slur.

Since the 1960 Winter Olympics, the community has also been known as Olympic Valley, based on a post office by this name. On August 28, 1958, at the behest of Representative B. F. Sisk, the United States Board on Geographic Names (BGN) decided that "Squaw Valley" would only refer to an older community in Fresno County (now known as Yokuts Valley). Nevertheless, in informal usage, "Squaw Valley" continued to refer to either community, creating considerable confusion. It was not until 2022 that the BGN officially renamed the surrounding area to Olympic Valley, as part of an effort to remove "squaw" from geographic names across the country.

== History ==
The Washoe people inhabited the area around Lake Tahoe for thousands of years and used present-day Olympic Valley as a summer tribal ground. The first Europeans passed through the valley during the 1849 California Gold Rush. A hay ranch was established in 1862.

The town of Claraville, formerly located at the mouth of the valley, was once among the biggest mining operations in the Lake Tahoe region. In June 1863, John Keiser and Shannon Knox reported outcroppings of gold at the mouth of Squaw Creek (now Washeshu Creek), attracting an influx of prospectors. There were rumors that the mine was salted with ore brought in from Virginia City, Nevada. George Wharton James, author of the book The Lake of the Sky doubts the mines were salted with ore and suggests that the energetic prospector Shannon Knox started the mine in good faith. He writes about the History of the Tahoe Region (pre 1915) in many of the chapters of his book. The valley's mining boom was short lived and by 1863–64 the valley had lost almost all of its inhabitants to the Comstock lode in Virginia City.

By 1942, Wayne Poulsen, a former star skier from the University of Nevada, had acquired 2,000 acres (810 ha) in the valley from the Southern Pacific Railroad. Poulsen met Alex Cushing, a Harvard University-trained lawyer, in 1946 while Cushing was vacationing at Sugar Bowl Ski Resort. During his vacation, Cushing toured the valley at Poulsen's invitation and decided to invest in building a ski resort there. Unlike Poulsen, Cushing had the political connections and access to the capital necessary to create a ski resort. In June 1948, the two founded the Squaw Valley Development Company and Cushing replaced Poulsen as president of the Squaw Valley Development Corporation by October 1949. Squaw Valley Ski Resort opened on Thanksgiving Day 1949. The resort was constructed with $400,000 raised by Cushing, including $150,000 of his own money. The creation of the Squaw Valley Development Corporation and Squaw Valley Ski Resort mark the modern era of the valley.

=== 1960 Winter Olympics ===
In 1954, Cushing began lobbying the International Olympic Committee to host the 1960 Olympic Winter games after he saw an article in the San Francisco Chronicle that detailed a bid by Reno, Nevada to host the games. Innsbruck, Austria, was Squaw Valley's primary competitor in the running for the 1960 Winter Games, and the valley won the right to host the games by a vote of 32–30 on the second ballot. As the Placer County community began to receive international attention, residents and officials from Squaw Valley in Fresno County contested its use of the same name before the United States Board on Geographic Names.

The games resulted in major infrastructure improvements to the area. The Placer County Sheriff's Office and a medical group opened local facilities. In September 1958, the United States Post Office Department began a mail service to the valley via the Tahoe City Post Office. Mail was postmarked "Squaw Village" to avoid confusion with the Fresno County community, where the department was studying reopening a post office. On December 1, 1959, a branch office opened at the Olympic Village to serve the Olympic Organizing Committee and California Olympic Commission. At the behest of Representative B. F. Sisk of Fresno County, it was named Olympic Valley. It was the first post office to be specially built for an Olympic Games. Mail clerks spoke five languages and had access to the event's interpreters' center. The state widened California State Route 89 to Truckee and expedited construction of Interstate 80 to connect Truckee to Sacramento. Across the Nevada state line, the first terminal building of Hubbard Field in Reno was completed in time for the games.

The 1960 Winter Olympics were the first Winter Olympics to be televised live and attracted millions of viewers. However, after the games, the area entered a period of decline that lasted until the 1980s.

=== Recent years ===
In 2010, Squaw Valley Ski Resort was acquired by KSL Capital Partners, terming what they called a "renaissance" for Olympic Valley. With its acquisition, KSL announced $50 million in improvements to Olympic Valley. The total amount was increased to $70 million when Squaw Valley and Alpine Meadows merged in October 2011. Investments include upgrading chair lifts and snow-making and grooming equipment.

In 2016, Squaw Valley Ski Holdings submitted a final application for entitlements for its proposed Village at Squaw Valley Specific Plan, a $1 billion plan that prompted the Attorney General of California to write a letter of concern to Placer County. The plan would include 850 hotel and condominium units and a 96-foot-tall "Mountain Adventure Camp" featuring a year-round indoor waterpark. According to the environmental review for the project, new development is projected to add 3,300 new car trips to local roads on peak days, and the project would have 20 "significant but unavoidable" impacts.

Sierra Watch, a California-based conservation advocacy group, started a grassroots campaign to "Keep Squaw True", holding public events and circulating an on-line petition in opposition to KSL Capital Partners' proposed expansion plan.

In November 2016, the Placer County Board of Supervisors approved KSL's controversial development proposal in spite of opposition from local conservation organizations, including Sierra Watch. Sierra Watch filed suit to overturn those approvals for violating the California Environmental Quality Act (CEQA) in December 2016.

In 2017, resort owners added a roller coaster to their development proposal.

In 2022, the United States Board on Geographic Names officially renamed the surrounding valley to Olympic Valley, matching the community's name, as part of a program to remove "squaw" from the names of geographic features across the country.

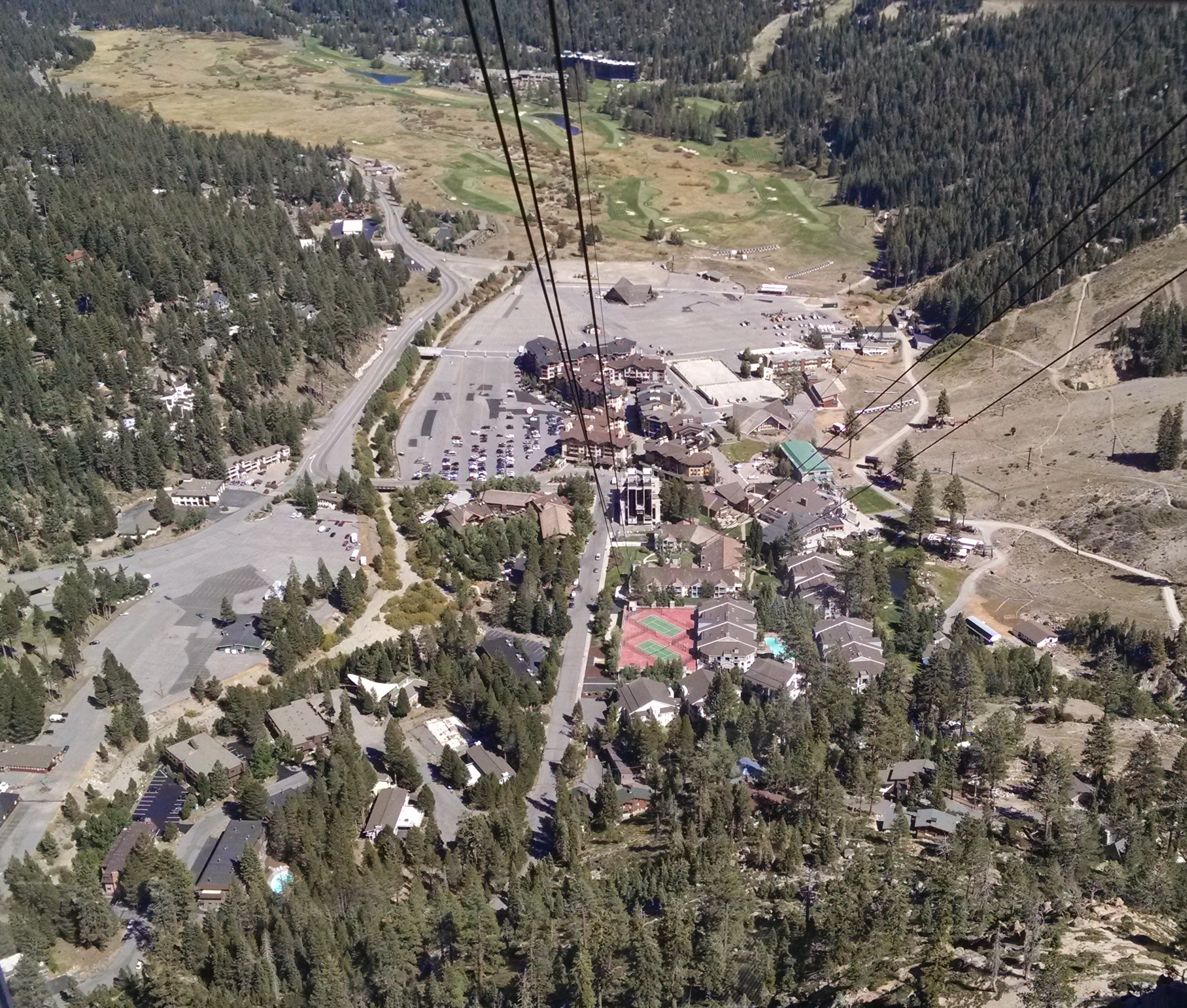
View from above

== Geography ==
Olympic Valley is located in eastern Placer County, California, in a valley of the same name. The 3.7-mile-long (6.0 km), 0.6-mile-wide (0.97 km) valley is formed by Washeshu Creek as it flows into the Truckee River. The community sits along California State Route 89 halfway between Truckee and Tahoe City. The United States Census Bureau places it in the Colfax–Monumental Ridge census county division.

== Climate ==
Olympic Valley experiences a dry-summer subalpine climate (Dsc) under the Köppen climate classification. Summertime is generally mild to warm, with cool nights, and winter time is cold and extremely snowy.

Climate data for Squaw Valley, California, 1991–2020 normals, extremes 1990–present
Month	Jan	Feb	Mar	Apr	May	Jun	Jul	Aug	Sep	Oct	Nov	Dec	Year
Record high °F (°C)	62 (17)	65 (18)	67 (19)	68 (20)	71 (22)	79 (26)	84 (29)	83 (28)	81 (27)	78 (26)	66 (19)	61 (16)	84 (29)
Mean maximum °F (°C)	52 (11)	53 (12)	56 (13)	60 (16)	64 (18)	72 (22)	76 (24)	75 (24)	71 (22)	63 (17)	60 (16)	51 (11)	77 (25)
Mean daily maximum °F (°C)	38.0 (3.3)	37.5 (3.1)	40.4 (4.7)	43.8 (6.6)	50.8 (10.4)	59.2 (15.1)	67.6 (19.8)	67.0 (19.4)	62.0 (16.7)	52.3 (11.3)	42.7 (5.9)	37.0 (2.8)	49.9 (9.9)
Daily mean °F (°C)	26.8 (−2.9)	27.2 (−2.7)	30.6 (−0.8)	34.0 (1.1)	41.4 (5.2)	49.3 (9.6)	56.0 (13.3)	55.4 (13.0)	49.6 (9.8)	40.6 (4.8)	33.1 (0.6)	26.6 (−3.0)	39.2 (4.0)
Mean daily minimum °F (°C)	15.6 (−9.1)	16.9 (−8.4)	20.7 (−6.3)	24.2 (−4.3)	31.9 (−0.1)	39.1 (3.9)	44.3 (6.8)	43.8 (6.6)	37.2 (2.9)	28.8 (−1.8)	23.5 (−4.7)	16.2 (−8.8)	28.5 (−1.9)
Mean minimum °F (°C)	−6 (−21)	−3 (−19)	3 (−16)	11 (−12)	19 (−7)	27 (−3)	32 (0)	31 (−1)	26 (−3)	16 (−9)	6 (−14)	−4 (−20)	−12 (−24)
Record low °F (°C)	−25 (−32)	−20 (−29)	−8 (−22)	6 (−14)	19 (−7)	25 (−4)	30 (−1)	24 (−4)	19 (−7)	5 (−15)	−1 (−18)	−12 (−24)	−25 (−32)
Average precipitation inches (mm)	10.58 (269)	9.31 (236)	8.80 (224)	5.04 (128)	3.51 (89)	1.26 (32)	0.33 (8.4)	0.40 (10)	0.86 (22)	4.07 (103)	6.81 (173)	11.53 (293)	62.5 (1,587.4)
Average snowfall inches (cm)	86 (220)	84 (210)	83 (210)	31 (79)	6 (15)	0.4 (1.0)	0 (0)	0 (0)	0 (0)	6 (15)	30 (76)	84 (210)	410.4 (1,036)
Average extreme snow depth inches (cm)	68.1 (173)	84.6 (215)	105.2 (267)	93.3 (237)	65.6 (167)	25.5 (65)	1.5 (3.8)	0.0 (0.0)	0.8 (2.0)	5.5 (14)	22.3 (57)	45.7 (116)	109.2 (277)
Average precipitation days (≥ 0.01 in)	12.8	12.8	13.6	11.6	9.8	3.8	1.3	1.9	3.2	6.5	10.6	13.8	101.7
Source 1: XMACIS2 (snow depth 2006–2020)
Source 2: WRCC

== Demographics ==
Historical population
Census	Pop.	Note	%±
1990	2,501		—
2000	926		−63.0%
2010	1,366		47.5%
2016 (est.)	823		−39.8%

As of 2021, Olympic Valley has about 924 year-round residents but can swell to a maximum overnight population of about 6,573, including visitors. There are about 663 residential units and 1,180 condominiums.

== Government ==
As an unincorporated community, Squaw Valley lacks a local government. Instead, Placer County agencies and special districts serve the area. The Olympic Valley Public Service District provides water, sewer, solid waste, fire protection, and emergency medical services to 5,350 acres (2,170 ha) within the valley and along California State Route 89.

Along with much of eastern Placer County, Olympic Valley is located in Supervisorial District 5. The Olympic Valley Municipal Advisory Council is an appointed body of local residents that advises the Placer County Board of Supervisors on land use, transportation, and other matters. The Olympic Valley Design Review Committee makes recommendations to the Placer County Planning Services Division on development proposals.

=== Incorporation efforts ===
In August 2013, a group named Incorporate Olympic Valley (IOV) submitted a petition to the Placer County Local Agency Formation Committee (LAFCO) in order to begin the process of attempting to incorporate Squaw/Olympic Valley into a town named Olympic Valley. Proponents of incorporation originally wanted to include Alpine Meadows, California in its efforts, but the citizens of Alpine Meadows rejected the proposal.

In December 2013, IOV submitted a formal application to the LAFCO which outlined the boundaries of the town they are proposing. Squaw Valley Ski Resort submitted a request to the Placer County LAFCO asking that it be excluded from the proposed town in April 2014. The Resort at Squaw Creek and Squaw Valley Lodge, two additional major businesses in the Olympic Valley area, submitted a letter to LAFCO in June 2014 urging the committee to deny the IOV incorporation application and to exclude them from the proposed town. Save Olympic Valley, a group of residents, property owners, and business owners backed by Squaw Valley Ski Resort, also questioned and expressed concerns about the incorporation effort.

In November 2015, the Placer County Local Agency Formation Commission announced that its members would vote against incorporation of Olympic Valley. IOV formally withdrew its incorporation petition for Olympic Valley in early December.

Incorporate Olympic Valley (IOV) was investigated by the California Fair Political Practices Commission for allegedly violating multiple sections of the California Political Reform Act. The allegations related to IOV's failure to file a statement of organization or monthly campaign statements for at least five months to the commission. Additionally, it was alleged that IOV did not include required disclaimers on campaign advertisements.

== Sports ==
Skiing and racing culture has been important to Olympic Valley since before it hosted the 1960 Olympic Winter Games. In addition to hosting the Winter Olympics, Olympic Valley has played host to races for the FIS Alpine Ski World Cup in 1969, 2017, 2023, and 2024. It also hosted the US Alpine Championships in the years 2002, 2013 and 2014 and the US Freestyle Championships in 2009. The area also hosts non-skiing sporting events, including the Western States Endurance Run, which begins at the base of the Palisades Tahoe ski area. The 2013 and 2014 Ironman Lake Tahoe triathlon also began and ended in Olympic Valley.

== Arts and culture ==
Olympic Valley has hosted the Wanderlust Festival, a music and yoga festival, annually since 2009. Other musical performances held in Olympic Valley include concerts by Jerry Garcia Band, Jurassic 5, Matisyahu, Yonder Mountain String Band, The Wailers, Brett Dennen, and Big Head Todd and the Monsters.

Olympic Valley is home to the Community of Writers conference. Alpenglow Sports, a local sporting goods store, hosts the Alpenglow Winter Film Series, in which athletes and explorers from around the world share stories about their experiences and adventures.

== Education ==
Olympic Valley is served by the Tahoe Truckee Unified School District. Lake Tahoe Preparatory School, a private, college-preparatory boarding school, is located in Olympic Valley.

== Notable people ==
An athlete from Olympic Valley has competed in every Winter Olympics since 1964, when Jimmie Heuga competed in the IX Olympic Winter Games. Because of this, Olympic Valley has taken the moniker "Official Supplier of Skiers to the US Ski Team." Many members of the US Ski Team began skiing as a part of Olympic Valley's Mighty Mites racing team for five- to ten-year-olds.

Notable winter athletes from Olympic Valley include:

- Shannon Bahrke – Olympic skier
- Travis Ganong – Olympic skier
- Jimmie Heuga – Olympic Bronze medal-winning skier
- Nate Holland – X Games Gold medal-winning snowboarder
- Bill Hudson – Olympic skier
- C. R. Johnson – professional skier and freeskier
- Greg Jones – Olympic skier
- Jeremy Jones – snowboarder
- Kristin Krone – Olympic skier
- Julia Mancuso – Olympic Gold, Silver, and Bronze medal-winning skier
- Tamara McKinney – World Cup Gold medal-winning skier
- Jonny Moseley – Olympic Gold medal-winning skier
- Shane McConkey – professional extreme skier
- Bob Ormsby – Olympic skier
- Michelle Parker – skier
- Daron Rahlves – Olympic skier
- Scot Schmidt – professional extreme skier
- Marco Sullivan – Olympic skier
- Eva Twardokens – Olympic skier

Other notable athletes:

- Emily Harrington – professional rock climber and mountaineer

== See also ==
- VIII Olympic Winter Games
- California Historical Landmarks in Placer County
- Pioneer Ski Area of America
