= Bill Briggs (skier) =

American skier

William Morse Briggs (born December 21, 1931) is notable as the first to ski the Grand Teton on June 15, 1971, and as a result is said to be the "father of extreme skiing" in North America. He is the director of the Great American Ski School, formerly located at Snow King Mountain in Jackson, Wyoming in the United States.

== First descent of the Grand Teton ==
The route required a 165-foot (50 m) free-hanging rappel, which Briggs performed while wearing skis. To substantiate the unverified descent, he arranged for Virginia Huidekoper and a photographer to flyover the peak in a Cesna 182 the following day to record the remaining tracks. The resulting photograph of the descent generated wider public interest in extreme skiing. This early activity in Jackson, Wyoming, contributed to the development of extreme backcountry and heliskiing into a broader commercial industry, eventually encompassing specialized equipment manufacturing, media production, and competitive events such as the World Extreme Skiing Championships and the World Heli Championships.

== Additional skiing records and awards ==
Bill Briggs also made first descents of other mountains in the Teton Range, including Middle Teton, South Teton, Mount Moran, and Mount Owen. He was the recipient of the 2003 Utah Ski archives Historical Achievement Award for his contributions to skiing. The International Skiing History Association awarded Briggs with a 2006 Lifetime Achievement Award in Ski Song for his six-decade career as a musician.

In 2008, Briggs was inducted into the U.S. National Ski and Snowboard Hall of Fame, with his citation reading in part:

Bill Briggs is regarded as the father of big mountain skiing in the United States. He was able to imagine and believe it possible to ski in places where no one else had skied before. His first ski descent of Wyoming’s Grand Teton on June 15, 1971 is regarded by most as the single crystallizing moment in American big mountain skiing. He also completed the first high ski traverse in the Canadian Rockies and the first modern ski descent of Mount Rainier.

== Personal life ==
William Morse Briggs was born in Augusta, Maine on December 21, 1931. He attended Dartmouth College in 1953 but eventually dropped out. While at Dartmouth, he discovered his love for skiing and mountaineering as a member of Dartmouth's Outing Club, and his love for music, including interest in yodeling and string instruments. Briggs is a founding member of the Stagecoach Band, which has played country and bluegrass music every Sunday since 1969 at the Stagecoach Bar in Wilson, Wyoming. He also founded and presides over the Hootenanny, an open mic music event that happens every Monday in Moose, Wyoming. He plays banjo, auto-harp and six and twelve-string guitars. Briggs sings traditional and contemporary folk songs, specializing in mountain yodels.
