= Truck Night in America =

American competition television series

- Genre: reality television
- Directed by: Rupert Smith
- Starring: Glen Plake "Pistol" Pete Sohren; Abe Wine; Rob "Bender" Park
- Narrated by: Howard Parker
- Country of origin: United States
- Original language: English
- No. of episodes: 24

Production
- Executive producers: Patrick Costello; David Markus
- Cinematography: Michael Millikan
- Editors: Nick Gagnon; H.A. Arnarson
- Running time: 42 minutes
- Production company: 51 Minds Entertainment

Original release
- Network: History Channel
- Release: March 18, 2018 – March 28, 2019

Truck Night in America (known outside of the US as Monster Motor Challenge) is a History Channel program that debuted in 2018.

The show features five contestants per episode competing through a series of races with eliminations after each event. After the first elimination round, a selection process teams an expert coach to each remaining amateur driver. Once the elimination events have narrowed the contestant pool down to two, they race independently against one another on a three-mile course known as "The Green Hell." Whoever completes the course in the shortest amount of time wins $10,000. In the event that neither cross the finish line, the contestant closest to doing so is awarded the prize.

In January 2019, coach "Pistol" Pete Sohren was killed in a UTV accident in Mexico, leaving a vacancy in the show. The show was not renewed for a third season.

== Coaches ==
"Pistol" Pete Sohren: a desert racing champion and truck builder

Glen Plake: an extreme sports pioneer and dirt track racer

Abe Wine: a truck builder and master fabricator

Rob "Bender" Park: rock crawling champion and master fabricator

== Episodes ==
=== Season 1 ===
No. overall	No. in season	Title	Original release date
1	1	"Welcome to the Green Hell"	March 8, 2018
Trucks spanning five decades compete, including a 1947 Dodge Power Wagon and a 1978 Jeep CJ7. Medics intervene when the Green Hell claims a victim.
2	2	"Over the Cliff"	March 15, 2018
Repairs are required to save a truck, and a 75-foot vertical drop puts the drivers' skills to the test. A driver pushes their truck to the very limit.
3	3	"Grudge Match"	March 22, 2018
Five trucks with 40-inch-plus tires ("Big Dogs") are brought onto the course, resulting in plenty of damage. In Green Hall, a rivalry intensifies. A finalist gets lost in the woods.
4	4	"Old vs New"	March 29, 2018
1970s and '80s trucks compete against one another. Drivers try to push ice cream
5	5	"Beware of Sharp Edges"	April 5, 2018
A 2,000 horsepower Dodge pickup truck competes against a 1971 Land Rover. A twist on tug of war leads to a big surprise for the losers. Medics are called in after a particularly difficult challenge.
6	6	"Buy the Farm"	April 12, 2018
The Big Dogs return and feature two pickups: a 1951 Chevy and 1971 GMC. Challenges feature the Silo Pulldown, Four Horsemen, and Green Hell.
7	7	"Winch War"	April 19, 2018
1990s cars are features. One driver is motivated by an emotional story, and two finalists face off in the Green Hell.
8	8	"Fire Starter"	April 26, 2018
A variety of trucks are highlighted on the Whiteout challenge and the Slingshot. The Green Hell takes out a truck.
9	9	"Bandana Brothers"	May 3, 2018
The Whiteout and Silo Pulldown challenges break a number of trucks, and the Green Hell has a surprise finish.
10	10	"In the Hole"	May 10, 2018
Five drivers test the limits of their personal trucks, and one vehicle is broken. A driver is blinded by smoke in the Fire Escape challenge. The Green Hell features a test of size versus skill.
11	11	"The Best of Truck Night"	May 17, 2018
A compilation episode of builds, crashes, drivers, and coaches' moments. Glen, Bender, Pistol, and Abe discuss season one best moments, as well as their favorite trucks.
12	12	"Battle of the Big Dogs"	November 10, 2018
A special Ford-centric episode, in which five rigs compete for $10,000. The Slag Heap challenge pushes three trucks past their limits. The Car Pull challenge requires an emergency response. The Green Hell burns the finalists. Only one Ford claims the title of the Truck Night Champion.
13	13	"Turn and Burn"	November 11, 2018
A second Ford special edition episode, with cars spanning four decades, and drivers drive the Bumps & Jumps, Balance Beams, and Green Hell challenges.

=== Season 2 ===
No. overall	No. in season	Title	Original release date
14	1	"Up the Creek"	January 31, 2019
A 1986 Suzuki Samurai and 2008 Lexus battle for the title of Truck Night Champion. A new challenge, Creek Climb, debuts.
15	2	"Couples Therapy"	February 7, 2019
The Big Dogs return as Truck Night has its first married couple as competitors.
16	3	"Duck Night in America"	February 14, 2019
Trucks go airborne and get soaked in the Whiteout challenge. A new challenge, the Travel Trailer, results in destruction. Green Hell remains a dangerous ordeal.
17	4	"Battle of the Busch Brothers"	February 21, 2019
Two guest stars, NASCAR Champions Kyle Busch and Kurt Busch, compete to win $10,000 for charity. They first go head-to-head with amateur drivers in the Car Pull and Travel Trailer, become they can move on to the Green Hell.
18	5	"Chill. Out."	February 28, 2019
The coaches switch up their strategies. Glenn needs to help his driver calm down in order to win.
19	6	"American Showdown"	March 6, 2019
It's Chevy versus Ford, and drivers take on the Slag Heap. Strategy determines the winners on the Cliff Plunge.
20	7	"Military Might"	March 7, 2019
Truck Night honors military veterans when Army, Navy and Airforce vets compete to show off their driving skills.
21	8	"Breaking Point"	March 14, 2019
An intense Creek Climb leads to an epic battle in Green Hell.
22	9	"Mudder Truckers"	March 21, 2019
The Whiteout gets dirty. The Four Horsemen pushes a rig to the breaking point. Green Hall requires the safety crew.
23	10	"David VS. Goliaths"	March 28, 2019
A 1984 Jeep CJ7 has specialized controls and a custom race seat. The toughest challenges include Sisyphus and Creek Climb.
24	11	"The Best of Truck Night Season 2"	March 28, 2019
The second season's compilation of builds, crashes, and drivers. The coaches reflect on the season's best moments.
