= Seth Morrison (skier) =

American alpine skier (born 1973)

Personal information
- Nationality: American
- Born: November 30, 1973 (age 52) Murray, Kentucky, U.S.
- Height: 5 ft 10 in(1.78 m)
- Weight: 155 lb (70 kg)

Sport
- Sport: Big Mountain
Medal record
2009 Powder Video Awards, Reader Poll Winner
- Updated on 2011-01-21

Seth Morrison is a professional skier. He has won many competitions and has appeared in a number of ski movies. He is best known for jumping off cliffs from extreme heights.

== Early life ==
Morrison was raised in Vail, Colorado, by his mom, a surgical nurse.

== Career ==
During his years of skiing, Morrison competed on mountains throughout the world, including doing back-flips off 100-foot cliffs. He has been interviewed on television several times. Morrison was sponsored by K2 skis in 1992 and was fired by K2 Skis in 2016, during which time the company produced several models of skis bearing his namesake. Full Tilt Ski boots released him while he had a pro model bearing his name after many seasons of having such promodels. Oakley released him while he had a pro model goggle and outwear bearing his name after many seasons of having said products. Hestra gloves released him while having a pro model glove after many seasons of having such gloves.

== Awards and competitions ==
- 2009 Powder Video Awards, Best Natural Air-Winner.
- 2009 Powder Video Awards, Reader Poll- Winner.
- 2009 Powder Video Awards, Full Throttle- Winner.
- 2008 Powder Video Awards, Reader Poll- Winner.
- 2008 Fri Flyt Awards, International Athlete
- 2007 Powder Video Awards, Best Natural Air- Winner.
- 2007 Powder Video Awards, Reader Poll- Winner.
- 2006 Powder Video Awards, Reader Poll- Third Place.
- 2005 Powder Video Awards, Reader Poll- Second Place.
- 2004 Powder Video Awards, Reader Poll- Winner.
- 2004 Powder Video Awards, Best Cliff Huck.
- 2003 Powder Video Awards, Full Throttle- Winner.
- 2003 Powder Video Awards, Reader Poll- Winner.
- 2002 Powder Video Awards, Reader Poll- Winner.
- 2001 Powder Video Awards, Best Male Performance- Winner.
- 2001 Poacher's Freeski Film Festival, Best Rider -Winner (in Ski Movie).

== Competition results ==
- 2000-2001 - Competitor in U.S. Extreme Freeskiing Championships. ESPN and ESPN 2
- 1999-2000 - Competitor in Johnny Moseley Invitational. NBC
- 1998-1999 - 8th place in Skier Cross in the X Games at Crested Butte. ESPN, ESPN 2, and ABC
- 1998-1999 - 12th place in Johnny Moseley Invitational. NBC
- 1998 - 9th place in the Canadian Freeskiing Championships in Whistler/Blackcomb
- 1993 - 2nd place(Tied) in the U.S. National Extremes (age 19)

== Filmography ==
- 2013 - Tracing Skylines, produced by Poor Boyz Productions (PBP)
- 2012 - The Dream Factory, produced by Teton Gravity Research (TGR)
- 2011 - The Ordinary Skier, produced by Oakley
- 2011 - One For The Road, produced by Teton Gravity Research (TGR)
- 2010 - Light the Wick, produced by Teton Gravity Research (TGR)
- 2009 - Re:session, produced by Teton Gravity Research (TGR)
- 2008 - Under the Influence, produced by Teton Gravity Research (TGR)
- 2007 - Lost and Found, produced by Teton Gravity Research (TGR)
- 2007 - Steep, produced by Mark Obenhaus
- 2007 - Believe, produced by Constantine Papanicolaou
- 2007 - Deep Winter, produced by Gigantic Pictures (stunts for a motion picture)
- 2006-2007 Anomaly, produced by Teton Gravity Research (TGR)
- 2006-2007 Ski Porn!, produced by Poor Boyz Productions (PBP)
- 2005-2006 Stars, Skis, and Hucks, produced by Chainsaw Productions
- 2005-2006 War, produced by Poor Boyz (PBP)
- 2005-2006 Show and Prove, produced by Studio 411
- 2005-2006 Higher Ground, produced by Warren Miller Entertainment (WME)
- 2004-2005 Yearbook, produced by Matchstick Productions (MSP)
- 2003-2004 Focused, produced by Matchstick Productions (MSP)
- 2003 - Keep Your Eyes Open, produced by Artisan Entertainment and Leisure Time Productions
- 2002-2003 Ski Movie III: The Front Line, produced by Matchstick Productions (MSP)
- 2001 - Ski Movie II: High Society, produced by Matchstick Productions (MSP)
- 2002 - Storm, produced by Warren Miller Entertainment (WME)
- 2000-2001 Cold Fusion, produced by Warren Miller Entertainment (WME)
- 2000 - Ski Movie, produced by Matchstick Productions (MSP)
- 1999 - Global Storming, produced by Matchstick Productions (MSP)
- 1998 - Sick Sense (MSP)
- 1997 - Pura Vida (MSP)
- 1996 - Fetish (MSP)
- 1995 - The Tribe (MSP)
- 1994 - The Hedonist (MSP)
- 1993 - Soul Sessions and Epic Impressions (Reel Adventure Films)(MSP)
- 1993 - Black Diamond Rush by Warren Miller
