= Syver =

Syver is a Norwegian male given name. As of June 2020, there are 749 men in Norway with the name Syver. The surname Syversen is a patronymic from Syver.

== Notable people ==
Notable people with this name include:

- Syver Berge (born 1939), Norwegian politician
- Syver Wærsted (born 1996), Norwegian cyclist
