= Glen Plake =

American alpine skier

- Born: September 9, 1964 (age 62); Livermore, California, US
- Occupation: Snow skier
- Height: 5 ft 9 in (175 cm)

Glen Plake (born September 9, 1964) is a US National Ski Hall of Fame skier. He grew up in Lake Tahoe, skiing Heavenly Valley. He is known for his appearances in ski films such as Greg Stump's The Blizzard of Aahhhs. Plake has been named a pioneer of extreme skiing in America by ESPN. Glen has been the host of the RSN program Reel Thrills.

Glen Plake married his wife Kimberly in 1991.

== Notable achievements and appearances ==
- In October 2006, Plake joined Slovenian ski company Elan where he contributes in a design and development role.
- Plake is a three-time World Freestyle Ski champion.
- In 2003, Plake was awarded a Ski Club of Great Britain Centenary Medal in recognition of his outstanding contribution and influence upon snowsports.
- In September 2009, Plake was named spokesperson of Learn a Snowsport Month (LASSM), a "public awareness initiative designed to encourage participation in skiing, snowboarding, cross country skiing and snowshoeing".
- In 2010, Plake was inducted into the U.S. Ski and Snowboard Hall of Fame.
- On September 23, 2012, Plake survived an avalanche that killed 11 fellow climbers in Nepal. He planned to ski down Manaslu without the aid of oxygen.
- Plake co-hosted History's television series Truck Night in America (2018-2019)
- In March 2022, Plake made a brief appearance in an Ikon Pass television commercial.

== Filmography ==
Plake has been featured in a number of ski films, including:

- Cheap Ski Movie (2010)
- The Edge of Never (2009)
- Steep (2007)
- Warren Miller's Higher Ground (2005)
- Warren Miller's Impact (2004)
- Warren Miller's Journey (2003)
- Mercon Industry's Guatemalan Persuader (2003)
- Warren Miller's Cold Fusion (2001)
- Fistful of Moguls (1998) with Jonny Moseley
- Snowhat? (1993) directed by Bruce Benedict
- License to Thrill (1989) directed by Greg Stump
- The Blizzard of Aahhhs (1988) directed by Greg Stump
- Maltese Flamingo (1986) directed by Greg Stump
