= Limited Snowboards =

Canadian snowboard brand

Limited Snowboards was a Canadian snowboard brand founded in Toronto in 1993 by Perry Gladstone and Ricardo Camargo. Limited Snowboards Inc. and its successors distributed snowboards bindings, boots, clothing and accessories under the brands Limited and LTD.

== Backstory ==
In 1989 and 1990 Perry produced his first snowboards under the Fishlips brand, a Canadian skateboard company he owned and operated. The line was discontinued and then restarted in 1991 as a collaboration with H-Street Skateboards' co-founder Tony Magnusson. In the winter of 1992, Perry recruited Ricardo to help him with the project until a former H-street investor challenged the brand ownership and Perry, Ricardo and Tony chose to abandon the project and create new brands of their own.

== First year ==
The first year of Limited's operations were run from Perry's kitchen desk, where he negotiated a manufacturing agreement with the upstart snowboard factory Surf Politix of Sainte Anne de Beaupré, Quebec. Two models were produced based on designs by Ricardo, graphic designer Todd De Koker and Limited's first team rider, Emanuel Krebs. Production was financed by a $30,000 Letter of Credit provided in advance by Japanese distributor Car Mate Manufacturing Ltd.,$15,000 in personal loans to the company by Perry and Ricardo and a matching $15,000 government-backed young entrepreneur loan from the Bank of Montreal. Approximately 300 boards were made the first season and, following delivery, Perry bought out Ricardo for his initial loan amount plus nominal goodwill and became the sole director of the company.

== Big in Japan ==
Although Canadian stores were slow on the uptake, Car Mate was very successful with the Limited brand and sales in Japan increased. In year two just under 1000 boards were produced. To advertise the Limited brand in Canada, Perry founded Vehicle Magazine, a quarterly action sports publication, which featured Limited products and advertisements alongside articles about local skateboarders and snowboarders. By year three the brand became popular in both Canada and the US and sales exceeded the one million dollar mark. To accommodate increasing demand for lower price points, production of the Limited brand was moved to the Pale Ski & Sport factory in Austria and a higher-end series of LTD branded boards were contracted to Industries Esthete Inc., in Chicoutimi, Quebec.

== Largest Canadian brand ==
By 1996 Limited was the largest Canadian snowboard brand worldwide with distributors in 14 countries. Micah Kornberg joined the company in the summer of 1996 as partner and COO and, in 1997, facilitated a series of investments in the company by labor-sponsored venture corporation, Sport Fund. With Sport Fund's support, Limited sought out potential acquisitions but was unable to close a deal before heavy industry consolidation forced the company to entertain offers from other suitors. In 1998, Limited Snowboards Inc. wound down its Canadian operations and sold the assets to the Volant Ski Company, LLC of Denver Colorado for an undisclosed amount. To facilitate the sale and integrate operations, Perry moved to Colorado as Volant's Director of Snowboarding. Micah also left Toronto to run competitor Sims Snowboards in Seattle, Washington.

== American engineering ==
The Volant Ski Company was famous for its stainless steel cap technology, which, while heavy, produced very responsive handling. To replicate this effect in a snowboard the Volant engineering team created the Powerband, a flat figure-eight band of stainless steel laminated above and below the wooden core. A series of limited boards ‘Powered by Volant’ were produced by Volant for the 1998/99 season while manufacturing of the LTD premium line remained with Industries Esthete in Canada.

Due to the labour-intensive construction and high cost of manufacturing in the United States, Volant had never turned a profit. One year after acquiring Limited, the Volant board of directors, led by angel investor Mike Markkula, decided to get out of snowboarding and invest in opposite season products. In 2000 Perry left Volant to pursue other interests after facilitating the sale of the Limited brand and all its assets to the Authentic Brands Group. Shortly after, the Authentic Brand Group also acquired Sims Snowboards, prompting Micah to leave the industry as well.
