= J.A. Redmerski =

American novelist

J.A. (Jessica) Redmerski (born November 25, 1975) is an American New York Times, Wall Street Journal and USA Today Bestseller List novelist. She is best known for her crime and romantic suspense novels.

Redmerski has written under multiple pen-names, including Sonja J. Breckon, Jessica Tacu, and Justine Carver.

Her book The Edge of Never was initially self-published in 2012, but was re-released in 2013 through Forever Romance/Grand Central Publishing.

As of 2025, Redmerski has converted to Christianity, and has removed the majority of her works from retailers. Her personal statement on her official website reads "For over thirty years, I misused the gift God gave me. Now, I’ve chosen to forsake worldly publishing success in order to honor and glorify God through my writing".

== Bibliography ==
Standalone novels
Name	Year Published	Genre	Notes
Dirty Eden	2012	Urban fantasy	originally published under penname Torvi Tacuski
Song of the Fireflies	2014	New adult romance	
The Moment Of Letting Go	2015	New adult romance	
Everything Under The Sun	2017	Literary fiction	as Jessica Redmerski
Allister Boone	2019	Fiction	originally published under penname Torvi Tacuski
The Waltz of Devil's Creek	2020	Historical fiction	originally published under penname Justine Carver
Silver Dawn Afire	2020	Young adult, Fantasy	as Sonja J. Breckon

The Darkwoods trilogy
Name	Year Published	Genre	Notes
The Mayfair Moon	2012	Young adult fantasy / Urban fantasy	
Kindred	2012	Young adult fantasy / Urban fantasy	
The Ballad of Aramei	2012	Young adult fantasy / Urban fantasy	

The Edge of Never series
Name	Year Published	Genre	Notes
The Edge of Never	2013	Romance / New adult romance	
The Edge of Always	2013	Romance / New adult romance	

In the Company of Killers series
Name	Year Published	Genre	Notes
Killing Sarai	2013	Romantic Suspense	
Reviving Izabel	2013	Romantic Suspense	
The Swan & the Jackal	2014	Romantic Suspense	
Seeds of Iniquity	2014	Romantic Suspense	
The Black Wolf	2015	Romantic Suspense	
Behind the Hands that Kill	2016	Romantic Suspense	
Spiders in the Grove	2018	Romantic Suspense	
The Darkest Half	2022	Romantic Suspense	
