= Doug Coombs =

American alpine skier (1957–2006)

- Born: September 24, 1957; Bedford, Massachusetts, United States
- Died: April 3, 2006 (aged 48); Couloir de Polichinelle in La Grave, France
- Occupations: Alpine Skier and Mountaineer
- Known for: Extreme skiing, film appearances (including Steep (2007) and Warren Miller films)
- Spouse: Emily Coombs (née Gladstone)
- Awards: World Extreme Skiing Champion (1991 and 1993)

Doug Coombs (September 24, 1957 – April 3, 2006) was an American alpine skier and mountaineer who helped to pioneer the sport of extreme skiing, both in North America and worldwide.

== Early life and education ==
Coombs was born in Boston and grew up in Bedford, Massachusetts, skiing in New Hampshire and Vermont. He attended Bedford High School (Massachusetts) before attending Montana State University in Bozeman where he honed his skiing skills at nearby Bridger Bowl before becoming a fixture of the extreme skiing scene in Jackson Hole, Wyoming, helping to found Valdez Heli-Ski Guides (and the heliskiing industry) in Alaska in 1994, and twice winning the World Extreme Skiing Championship, in 1991 and 1993.

== Personal life ==
Coombs married Emily Gladstone in 1992 and, in 1993, they founded Doug Coombs Steep Skiing Camps Worldwide in Jackson Hole, Wyoming. In 1997, the Coombs moved the business to Europe, and the company continues to operate today in La Grave and Chamonix, in the French Alps. Doug and his wife Emily have a son, David.

== Death ==
While skiing with friends on April 3, 2006, Doug Coombs died from a severe fall at the Couloir de Polichinelle in La Grave, France. He was trying to rescue his friend Chad VanderHam, who had fallen himself. Both skiers fell approximately 500 feet. Doug Coombs was found dead after the fall, and VanderHam later died from his injuries. Coombs was 48.

A memorial for Coombs was held at Jackson Hole Mountain Resort on June 25, 2006. A run on the upper part of the mountain memorializes him.

== Legacy ==
Doug Coomb's interest in skiing has continued through the Doug Coomb's Foundation, later renamed Coomb's Outdoors. Established in 2013, the organization provides children from low-income families with access to outdoor recreation opportunities in the Jackson, Wyoming area by offering equipment, guidance, and support for activities such as skiing and other outdoor sports. Its stated aim is to increase participation in outdoor activities among underserved youth in the community.

His life is described in Rob Cocuzzo's book 'Tracking the Wild Coomba'.

Coombs' Law is described as "there are no bad ski conditions, only bad skiers."

== Filmography ==
While not an exhaustive list, Doug Coombs has been featured in a number of ski films, including:

- Groove: Requiem In the Key of Ski (1991, Greg Stump), competing in the Extreme Skiing Invitational at Blackcomb, in which he complains that the course, in the Saudan Couloir, is not extreme
- Aspen Extreme (1993), credited as stunt skier
- Matchstick Productions "The Hedonist" (1994) Final scene.
- Teton Gravity Research's The Continuum (1996)
- Warren Miller's Cold Fusion (2001)
- Warren Miller's Storm (2002)
- Warren Miller's Journey (2003)
- Waiting Game (2005)
- Fantastic Four (2005), stunts
- Warren Miller's Off the Grid (2006) contains a tribute to Doug Coombs
- Steep (2007)
- The Edge of Never (2009)
- Swift. Silent. Deep. (2010), archive footage.
