= Andreas Fransson =

Swedish extreme skier

Personal information
- Nationality: (Sweden)
- Born: 15 April 1983
- Died: 29 September 2014 (aged 31) Monte San Lorenzo, Chile

Sport
- Sport: Skiing

Andreas Fransson (15 April 1983 – 29 September 2014) was a Swedish extreme skier perhaps best known for having made descents of the hitherto un-skied specific faces of mountains. Among his inaugural descents was that of the south face of Denali in Alaska during the spring of 2011.

Fransson died alongside JP Auclair in an avalanche on 29 September 2014 on Monte San Lorenzo in Aysen, Chile while filming for the webisode series Apogee Skiing.
