= Scot Schmidt =

American extreme skier (born 1961)

Scot Schmidt (born July 21, 1961, in Helena, Montana) is a professional extreme skier.

Schmidt began ski racing in his hometown of Helena, Montana. He moved to Squaw Valley in 1979 to pursue a dream of making the U.S. Ski Team., and started skiing professionally in 1983. That year, Warren Miller Entertainment invited him to showcase his explosive and suspended style in what would be his first of over 40 films. In his 35th year as an athlete with The North Face, Schmidt became a designer and technical consultant for the Steep Tech line of ski wear.

In 2003 Schmidt began skiing at The Yellowstone Club, a resort in his home state of Montana, and in 2007 he became the Club’s Ski Ambassador.

In 2014, Schmidt was recognized by his peers and inducted into the US Ski Hall of Fame.

As of 2021, Schmidt currently resides in Big Sky, Montana.

== Filmography ==
Career Film Highlights:

Major Films:

- 2019, “Ski Bum – The Warren Miller Story”
- 1994, “True Lies”
- 1992, “Aspen Extreme”

Ski Films:

Greg Stump Productions:

- 2012 “Legends of Aahhh’s”
- 1996, "Siberia"
- 1994, "P-tex, Lies, & Duct Tape"
- 1992, "Skiers Guide to the Galaxy"
- 1991, "Steep Techniques"
- 1991, "Groove Requiem"
- 1990, "Dr. Strangelove"
- 1989, "License to Thrill"
- 1988, "Rhythm Divine"
- 1988, "The Blizzard of Aahhh's"

Warren Miller Productions:

- 2020, “Future Retro”
- 2014, “Ticket to Ride”
- 1996, "Locals Only"
- 1995, "Five Winter Stories"
- 1994, "In Search of Powder"
- 1993, "Steeper and Deeper"
- 1992, "The Scot Schmidt Story"
- 1989, "White Magic"
- 1988, "Escape to Ski"
- 1987, "White Winter Heat"
- 1986, "Beyond the Edge"
- 1985, "Steep and Deep"
- 1984, "Ski Country"
- 1983, "Ski Time"

Scot Gaffney Productions:

- 1997, "The Promised Land"
- 1995, "Walls of Freedom"

Matchstick Productions:

- 2017, “Drop Everything”
- 2013, “McConkey”
- 1996, "Fetish"
- 1995, "The Hedonist"

The North Face:

- 1999, "Higher On The Mountain"

Eric Perlman Productions:

- 1992, "Extreme Skiing IV"
- 1991, "Extreme Force"
- 1990, "Extreme Skiing III"
- 1989, "Extreme Skiing II"
- 1988, "Extreme Skiing I”

Mike Douglas, Salomon Freeski TV Series:

- 2014 Season 7/Episode 12, “Legend Scot Schmidt”

Outlook: Icons Revealed: Season 3 / Episode 4:

- 2016 – Scot Schmidt

Matt Herriger

- 2012 - Winter’s Wind
