= Monte San Lorenzo =

Mountain

San Lorenzo
- Monte Cochrane
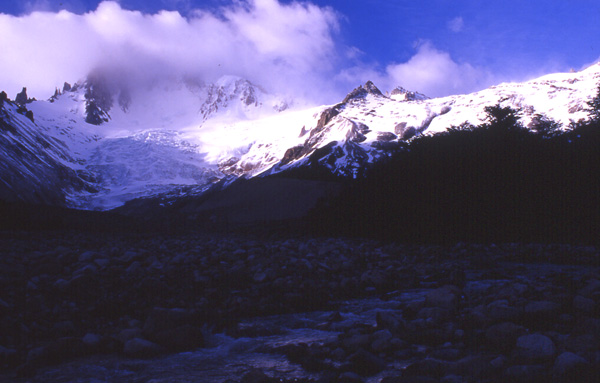
- San Lorenzo showing the route of ascent from the Chilean side.

Highest point
- Elevation: 3,706 m (12,159 ft)
- Prominence: 3,319 m (10,889 ft); Ranked 60th
- Listing: Ultra
- Coordinates: 47°35′30″S 72°18′24″W

Geography
- Location within South America
- Location: Patagonia; Santa Cruz, Argentina/ Aisén, Chile border
- Parent range: Andes

Climbing
- First ascent: 1943 by Alberto Maria de Agostini

Monte San Lorenzo, also known as Monte Cochrane, is a mountain on the border between Argentina and Chile in Patagonia, reaching a height of 3,706 metres (12,159 ft). The Chilean name of Cochrane comes from the nearby town of Cochrane where climbers often approach the mountain. The peak was first climbed in 1943 by Alberto Maria de Agostini.

The mountain is covered by three large glaciers (two in Argentina and one in Chile). The Argentine glaciers show clear evidence of retreat.

== Incident ==
The peak gained further notoriety in 2014 when professional ski-mountaineers JP Auclair and Andreas Fransson perished on its slopes in a large avalanche.

== Gallery ==
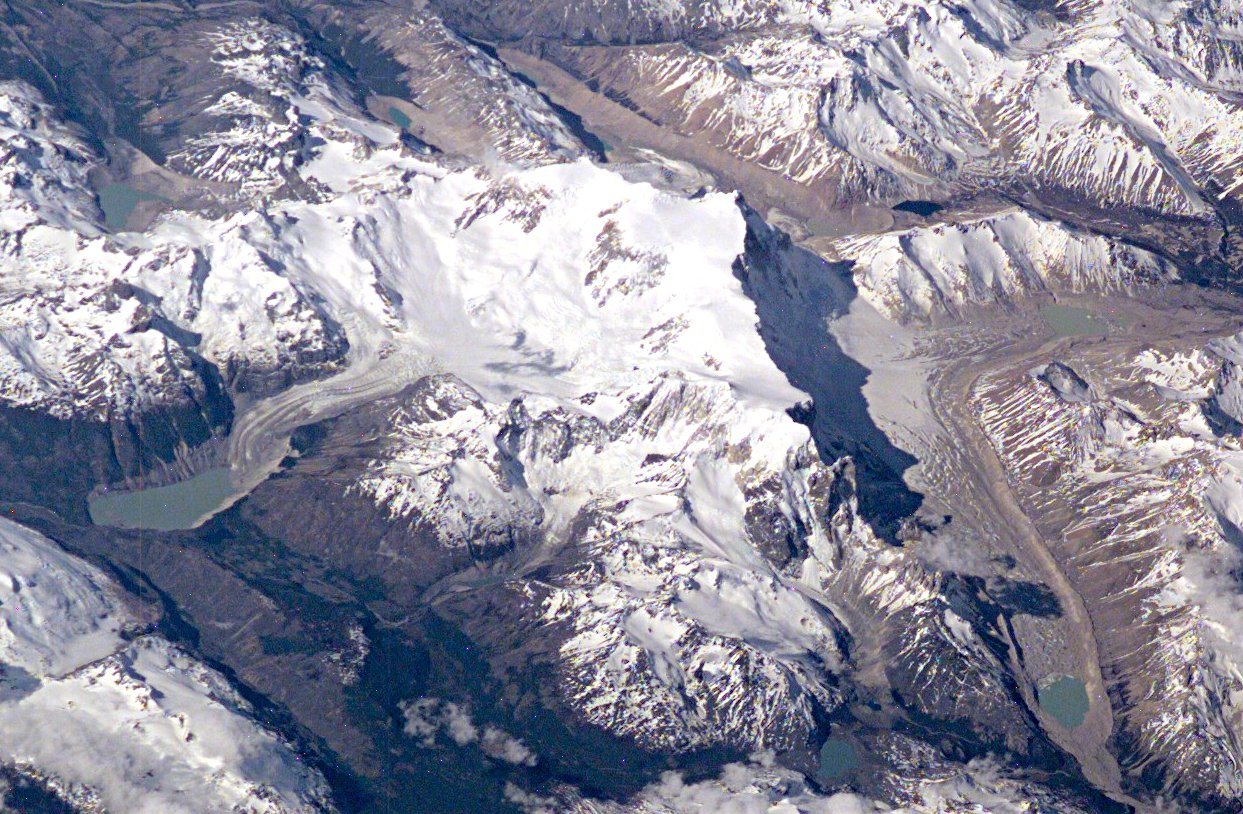
NASA image of San Lorenzo as seen from the south

== See also ==
- List of peaks by prominence
- List of ultras of South America
