= Fred Syversen =

Norwegian freeskier (born 1966)

Fred Roar Syversen (born 1966) is a Norwegian freeskier.

In 2008 he unintentionally set a world record by performing a 107 meters (352 ft) high jump in the Alps.
