= Volant skis =

Brand of ski equipment

Volant
- Type: Subsidiary of Amer Sports
- Industry: Snowsports
- Founded: 1989
- Headquarters: Altenmarkt, Salzburg, Austria
- Products: Ski equipment
- Parent: Amer Sports
- Website: www.volantski.com

Volant is a brand of ski equipment, currently owned by Amer Sports. It was founded as an independent company in the US, by brothers Hank and Bucky Kashiwa in 1989.

In 2001 Volant production was moved from Wheat Ridge, Colorado, to Atomic's Altenmarkt factory in Austria on an OEM basis.

== See also ==
- Volant Spatula, a reverse camber and reverse side cut ski
