= JP Auclair =

Canadian freestyle skier

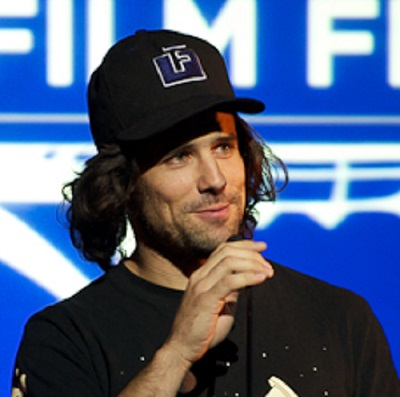

Personal information
- Born: August 22, 1977 Sainte-Foy, Quebec City, Canada
- Died: September 29, 2014 (aged 37) Aysen, Chile

Jean-Philippe Auclair (August 22, 1977 – September 29, 2014) was a Canadian freeskier. He was born in Sainte-Foy, Quebec. JP helped Salomon launch the 1080 ski in 1998 and in 2002, along with fellow freeskier Tanner Hall founded Armada skis, a freestyle-only skiing company and remained a member of their "Pro Team" from Nov. 11, 2002 until his death. His sponsors included Armada skis, Orage Clothing, Giro Helmets, Level Gloves, JoyStick Poles, D-Structure, Mount Seymour, Stoneham, and SnowParkNZ. Auclair was known for various styles of facial hair, from a long goatee in the mid 90s to a Magnum, P.I. mustache over the turn of the millennium. Auclair also took roles in many ski movies, including the 2012 release of Sherpas Cinema's All.I.Can.

Auclair died alongside Andreas Fransson in an avalanche on September 29, 2014, on Monte San Lorenzo in Aysen, Chile while filming for the webisode series Apogee Skiing.

The Adult Swim series Off the Air features Auclair's "Street Segment" from All.I.Can in season four's fourth episode titled "Transportation".

In 2017, The North Face, Sherpas Cinema collaborated to produce the short film "Imagination", featuring professional freeskier Tom Wallisch, in honor of Auclair.
