= Shane McConkey =

Professional skier and BASE jumper

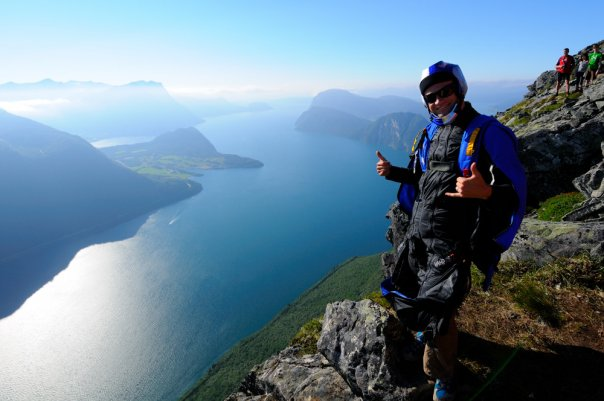
- McConkey at 2008 BASE Race; Romsdalen, Norway

Personal information
- Nicknames: "Saucer Boy"; "Cliff Huckstable"
- Nationality: Canada
- Born: December 30, 1969 Vancouver, British Columbia, Canada
- Died: March 26, 2009 (aged 39) Dolomite Mountains, Italy

Sport
- Sport: Big Mountain, Ski-BASE, Wingsuit flying

Shane McConkey (December 30, 1969 – March 26, 2009) was a professional skier and BASE jumper. He was born in Vancouver, British Columbia and eventually based himself in Olympic Valley, California. Due to an itinerant childhood, he never identified with a single place, but he was said to have come from Boulder, Colorado. It was from here that he started his professional skiing career. He did so after dropping out of the University of Colorado Boulder to pursue his dreams.

== Biography ==
McConkey won numerous awards and competitions. He started as a competitive ski racer but moved on to be featured in a long line of extreme skiing movies. McConkey was known for combining BASE jumping with skiing (i.e., ski-BASE jumping), as seen in such feats as skiing into a BASE jump off the Eiger. McConkey went to Burke Mountain Academy. He was also known for his contributions to ski design, notably being the father of reverse sidecut and reverse camber skis (aka: skis with rocker); first mounting bindings onto water skis for use in Alaska, then with the Volant Spatula and, more recently, the K2 Pontoon ski design. McConkey's high-speed chairlift and ski area at Park City Mountain Resort are named after his father, Jim McConkey, who was an early proponent of extreme skiing in the U.S.

On April 2, 2011, Shane McConkey was inducted into the U.S. Ski and Snowboard Hall of fame along with other Tahoe skiers, Daron Rahlves and Glen Plake.

== Death ==
On March 26, 2009, Shane McConkey died during a ski-BASE jump on the Sass Pordoi, a mountain in the Sella group of the Italian Dolomites. One of his skis failed to release, sending him into a spin. After he corrected the problem, it was too late to deploy his parachute.

== Career accomplishments ==
2005: Nominated for Laureus World Alternative Sportsperson of the Year, ranked #1 in Powder Magazine's Reader Poll and won Powder Magazine 's Full Throttle Award.

2004: Ranked #2 again in Powder Magazine’s Reader Poll, won Powder Magazine’s Full Throttle award, won Powder Magazine’s Best Helmet Cam award, went ski BASE jumping all over Europe, double front flip off the Eiger and got married in Thailand.

2003: Ranked #2 in Powder Magazine’s Reader Poll, completed his first of over 700 BASE jumps.

2002: Ranked #1 in Powder Magazine’s Reader Poll and invented a revolutionary powder ski: The Volant Spatula with reverse camber and reverse sidecut.

2001: ESPN Action Sport Awards Skier of the Year, Red Bull Ultra Cross’s Big Air Comp - 1st and ranked #1 in Skiing Magazine’s Top 25 skiers in North America.

== Competition results ==
2000:

- Nea Award Winner - Freeskiing Male
- Bridge Day Championships - 5th.
- 3rd Exit Style Winner of Judges Choice Award
- Gravity Games Big Mtn. Champion, Gravity Games Skiercross - 6th
- Gravity Games Big Air - 7th
- X-Games Skiercross - 5th
- Japan Core Games Skiercross Champion- 3rd.
- Johnny Moseley Invitational - 3rd.

1999:

- ESPN X-Games Skier Cross - 2nd.
- IFSA World Tour of Freeskiing - 5th.
- US Freeskiing Nationals - 5th
- World Tour event at Andermatt - 3rd.

1998:

- IFSA World Tour of Freeskiing Champion- 2nd.
- European Freeskiing Champion- 2nd.
- U.S. Freeskiing Nationals - 2nd.
- Canadian Freeskiing Championships-4th.

1996:

- IFSA Overall World Tour Champion - Unofficial tour- 4th.
- European Freeskiing Champion
- U.S. Freeskiing Championships-4th.
- World Extreme Skiing Championships-6th.

1995:

- U.S. National Freeskiing Champion
- South American Freeskiing Champion
- Pro Mogul Tour Overall - 16th.
- 1st seed and Japan Super Mogul - 7th.

1994:

- South American Freeskiing Champion
- World Extreme Skiing Championships-2nd
- Pro Mogul Tour Overall-8th
- 1st seed and Pro Mogul Tour Event at Copper Mtn. - 1st.

== Filmography ==
- McConkey (2013)
- Ultimate Rush (2012)
- G.N.A.R. (2010)
- Superheroes of Stokes (2012)
- In Deep: The Skiing Experience (2009)
- Claim (2008)
- Seven Sunny Days (2007)
- Steep (2007)
- Push (2006)
- The Hit List (2005)
- Warren Miller's Higher Ground (2005)
- Yearbook (2004)
- Focused (2003)
- Immersion (2002)
- Ski Movie III: The Front Line (2002)
- Ski Movie 2: High Society (2001)
- Ski Movie (2000)
- There's Something About McConkey (2000)
- Global Storming (1999)
- Sick Sense (1998)
- Pura Vida (1997)
- Fetish (1996)
- Walls of Freedom (1995)
- The Tribe (1995)
- TGR's The Realm (1994)
- Nick Nixon's Alpine Rapture (1993)
- Nick Nixon's Ski Theater (1992)

== The Shane McConkey Award ==
Started in partnership with the Shane McConkey Foundation, this award was created as part of the annual Wasatch Mountain Film Festival in Salt Lake City, Utah to honor the best adventure short films of the year.

=== Award recipients ===
- 2015: Stu Thomson - The Ridge
- 2016: Jason Piszczor - Without An Image
- 2017: Josh Lowell, Nick Rosen, & Peter Mortimer- Dodo's Delight
- 2018: Tyler Wilkinson-Ray - The Frozen Road
- 2019: Nate Dappen - The Passage
- 2020: Tommy Joyce - The Trilogy
- 2021: Niobe Thompson - The Long Today
- 2022: Tim Jones - Rite of Passage: The Story of the Wurl
