= World Extreme Skiing Championship =

The World Extreme Skiing Championships (WESC) was an extreme skiing competition held from 1991 to 2000 in Valdez, Alaska. It was brought back for one year in 2011 but was discontinued for lack of athlete interest. Co-founder Karen Davey Stewart died in September 2015.
