= Matchstick Productions =

American film production company

- Company type: Multi-media company
- Industry: Action sports
- Founder: Steve Winter, Murray Wais
- Headquarters: Crested Butte, CO, USA
- Key people: Scott Gaffney, Eben Wight, Ben Sanford, Mike Curran, Beau Larson
- Products: action sports films, consumer products, live events, online media
- Services: film production, commercial production, television production, custom digital content production
- Website: http://www.mspfilms.com

Matchstick Productions, also known as MSP Films, is a film production company based in Crested Butte, Colorado that specializes in content creation and expert cinematography. Steve Winter and Murray Wais founded the company in 1992. According to MSP’s website, “Matchstick aims to create entertaining films that not only are stunning visually but on the cutting edge of action sports.”

MSP has released a feature-length ski movie every year since 1992 with several gaining critical acclaim: their breakthrough film “Ski Movie”, featuring many of the world’s best skiers at the time, was released in 2000 and won “Movie of the Year” from both Powder Magazine and Freeze Magazine. MSP is the most award-winning ski film company in history, with eight “Movie of the Year” honors and “Best Documentary” prize at the Powder Video Awards, three Emmy nominations for outstanding camerawork, and “Viewers’ Choice” runner-up at the 2013 Tribeca Film Festival.

== Filmography ==
- Soul Sessions - 1993
- The Hedonist - 1994
- The Tribe - 1995
- The Fetish - 1996
- Pura Vida - 1997
- Sick Sense - 1998
- Global Storming - 1999
- Ski Movie - 2000
- Ski Movie 2 : High Society - 2001
- Ski Movie III: The Front Line - 2002
- Immersion - 2002
- Seth Morrison Chronicles - 2003
- Focused - 2003
- Yearbook - 2004
- The Hit List- 2005
- Push/Pull - 2006
- Seven Sunny Days: Short Stories From A Long Winter - 2007
- Claim - 2008
- In Deep - 2009
- The Way I See It - 2010
- Attack of La Nina - 2011
- Superheroes of Stoke - 2012
- McConkey - 2013
- Days of My Youth - 2014
- Fade to Winter - 2015
- Ruin and Rose - 2016
- Drop Everything - 2017
- All In - 2018
- Hoji - 2018
- Return to Send'er - 2019
- HUCK YEAH! - 2020
- A Biker's Ballad - 2021

== McConkey ==
Shane McConkey began working with Matchstick in 1995 while filming their movie “The Tribe”. Shane became close with the MSP crew, and starred in almost all of the MSP films from 1998 through 2008.

On March 26, 2009, while filming with MSP in the Dolomite Mountains of Italy, Shane was attempting a ski-BASE jump when one of his skis did not release causing a catastrophic failure and ultimately his death. In 2013, MSP and Red Bull Media House released McConkey a documentary film about Shane's life and untimely death. The world premiere was held in Shane's hometown of Squaw Valley, California before a crowd of 4,500 viewers.

== Cineflex Elite ==
In 2013 MSP purchased a Cineflex Elite gyro-stabilized camera system built by General Dynamics. Primarily used for aerial film work from a helicopter, MSP has developed unique mounts to attach the Cineflex system to a pickup truck (CineTruck) and side-by-side ATV (CineRanger). This camera system has since been utilized to film aerial shots for the motion picture “KickAss 2”, the 2014 Baja 500 off-road race, and commercial projects for Anheuser-Busch and American Express in addition to MSP’s 2014 ski film “Days of My Youth.”.
