= Extreme skiing =

Form of skiing on especially steep slopes

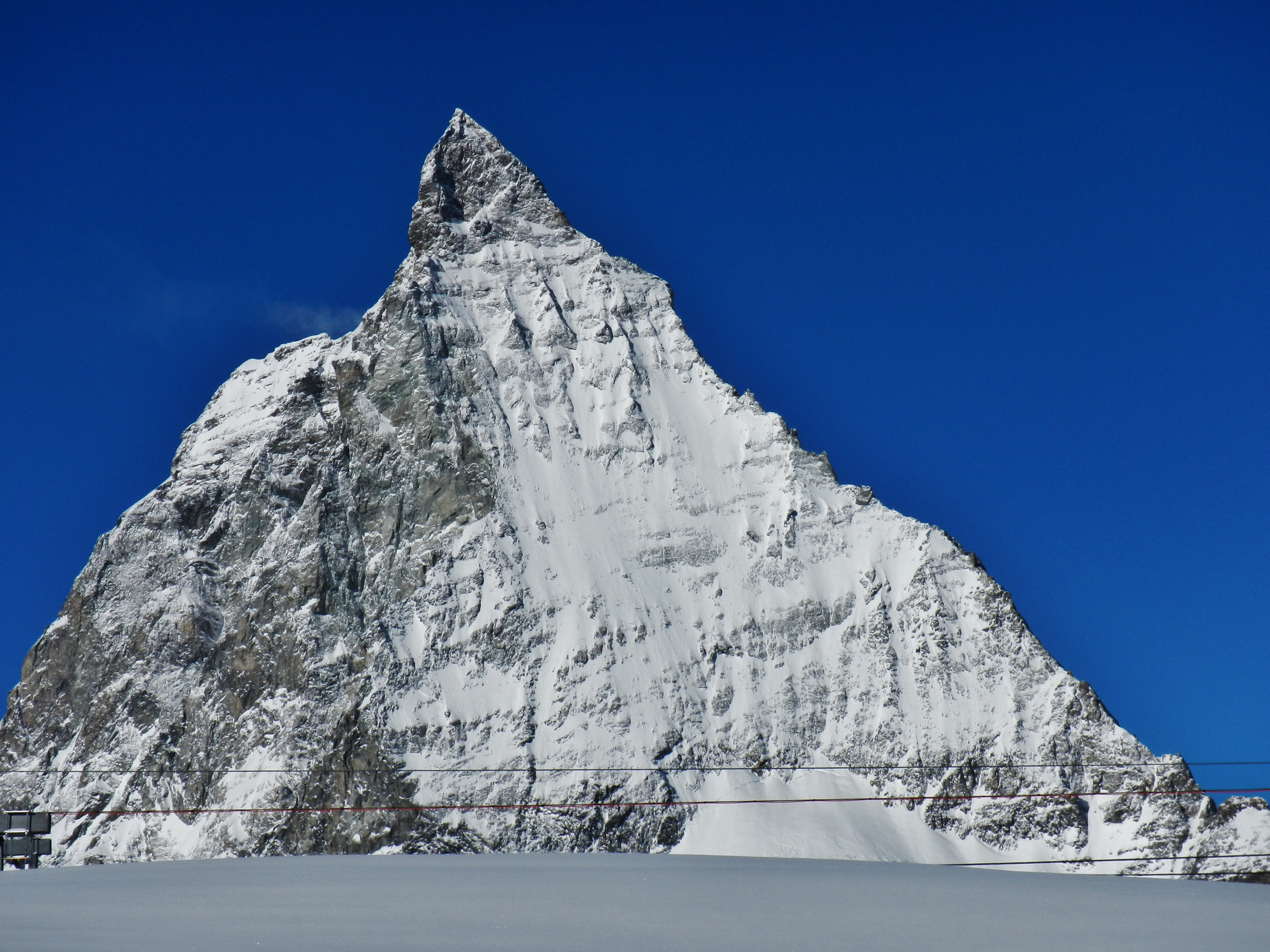
The east face of the Matterhorn. Toni Valeruz made the first ski descent of the face on 60+ degree slopes on 14 May 1975, from the Shoulder of the Hörnli Ridge.

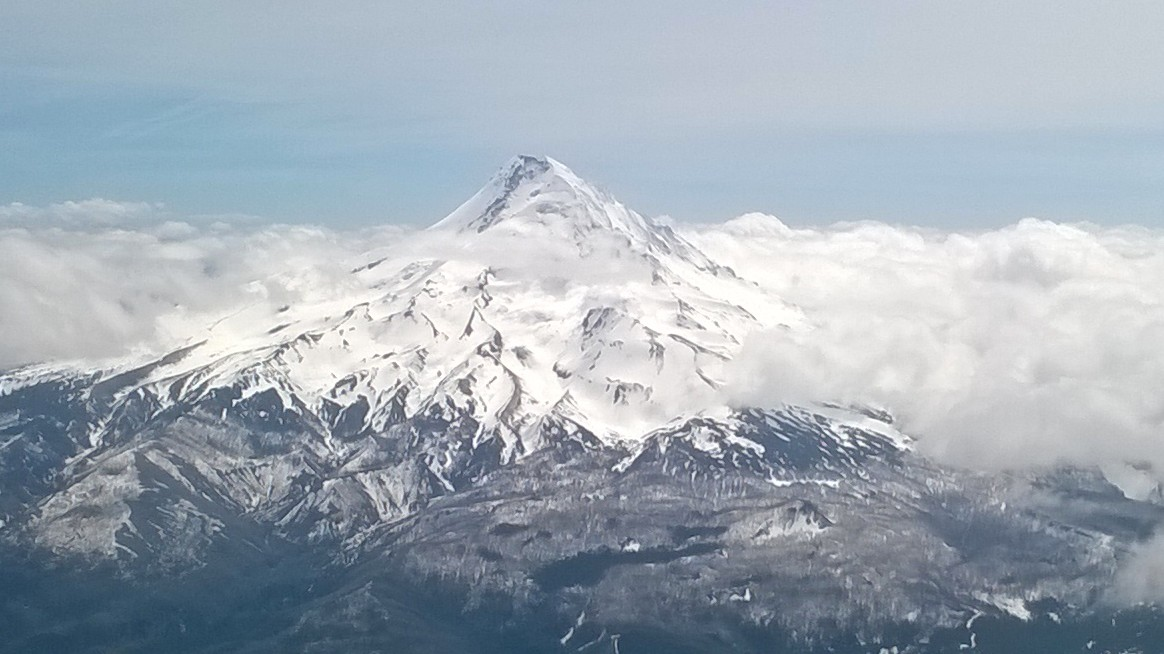
Mount Hood, the location of Saudan's 'first descent'.

Extreme skiing is a form of skiing performed on long, steep (typically from 45 to 60+ degrees, or grades of 100 to 170 percent) slopes in mountainous terrain. The French coined the term 'Le Ski Extreme' in the 1970s. The first practitioners include Swiss skier Sylvain Saudan, who invented the "windshield wiper" turn in the mid-1960s, and in 1967 made the first descents of slopes in the Swiss, French and Italian Alps that were previously considered impossible. Saudan's 'first descent' in America was at Mt. Hood 3 March 1971. Early American practitioners include Bill Briggs, who descended Grand Teton on 15 June 1971. The Frenchmen Patrick Vallençant, Jean-Marc Boivin and Anselme Baud and the Italians Stefano De Benedetti and Toni Valeruz were among those who further developed the art and brought notoriety to the sport in the 1970s and 1980s.

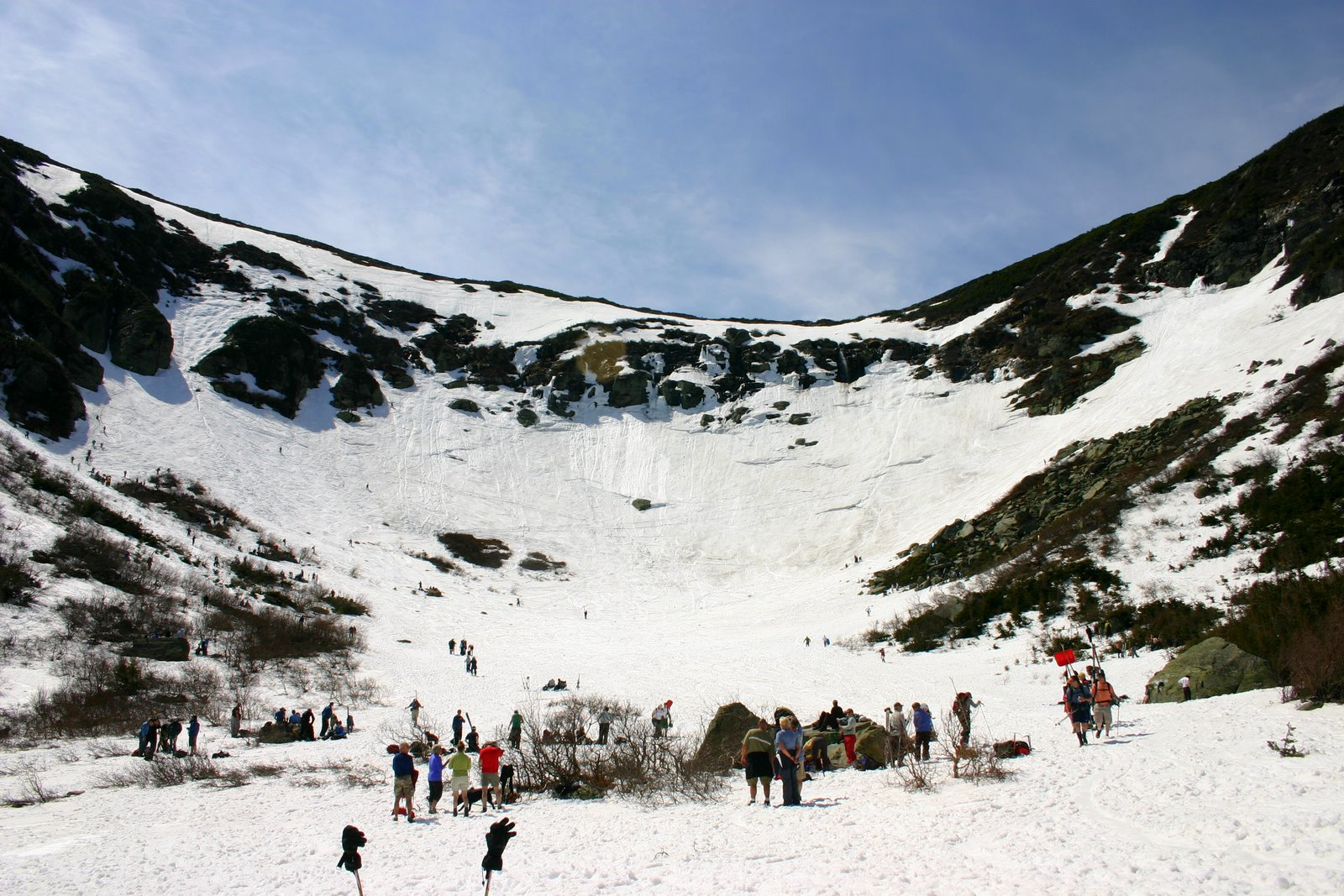
Tuckerman's Ravine, found on Mount Washington in New Hampshire, is a popular location for extreme skiing in North America.

The key North American skiers who popularized the sport include: Doug Coombs, Shane McConkey, Seth Morrison, David W. Kraft, Glen Plake and Scot Schmidt, known as The Extreme-6 and all considered among the top extreme skiers in the world during their prime.

Because of the extremely long, steep slopes, and dangerous terrain, single mistakes at the wrong moment by some extreme skiers have led to them being seriously injured or killed.

Extreme skiing in the U.S. took off in the mid-1980s after the movie Maltese Flamingo came out in 1986, and John Cummings’ book, Hallowed Be the Extreme, documented the lifestyle of extreme skiers.
