= Warren Miller (director) =

American film director

- Born: October 15, 1924; Los Angeles, California, US
- Died: January 24, 2018 (aged 93); Orcas Island, Washington, US
- Occupations: Skier; film producer; director
- Years active: 1950–2004
- Known for: Skiing films, Warren Miller Entertainment

Warren A. Miller (October 15, 1924 – January 24, 2018) was an American ski and snowboarding filmmaker. He was the founder of Warren Miller Entertainment and produced, directed and narrated films until 1988. His published works include over 750 sports films, several books and hundreds of non-fiction articles.

== Early years ==
Warren Anthony Miller was born in Hollywood, Los Angeles, to Helena Humphrey Miller and Albert Lincoln Miller. He had two older sisters, Mary Helen Miller and Betty Jane "BJ" Miller. As a young man he took up the hobbies of skiing, surfing, and photography. At the age of 18, with the U.S. ten months into World War II, he enlisted in the U.S. Navy and served in the South Pacific. On Christmas vacation in 1944, he first filmed skiing with a borrowed camera in Yosemite. Upon his discharge from the Navy in 1946, Miller bought his first 8mm movie camera, a Bell & Howell for $77 (equivalent to $1,271 in 2025). He and a friend, Ward Baker, moved to Sun Valley, Idaho, where they lived in a teardrop trailer in the parking lot of the Sun Valley ski resort, and worked as ski instructors. In their free time, they filmed each other skiing to critique and improve their ski techniques. During the summers they shifted to the California coast where they filmed each other surfing.

== Career ==
After Miller showed his skiing and surfing films to friends, with accompanying commentary, he began to receive invitations to show and narrate them at parties. In 1949, he founded Warren Miller Entertainment (WME) and began producing one feature-length ski film per year. He borrowed money to rent halls and theaters, and charged admission to his shows. He booked show halls near ski resorts so that he could film the next year's footage during the day, and show the current film in the evening. Before long he was showing his films in 130 cities a year.

Miller continued to head Warren Miller Entertainment until the late 1980s when he sold the company to his son, Kurt Miller. Kurt later sold the company to Time, Inc., which sold it in 2007 to Bonnier Corporation, and in 2013 Warren Miller was acquired by Active Interest Media. While transitioning out of his executive role, Miller still maintained his creative role as director and narrator for the films into the 1990s. The makers of later films, including Warren Miller's Higher Ground (2005) and Warren Miller's Off the Grid (2006), used Miller's narration from previous films rather than recording new narration. In 1998, Miller became Director of Skiing at The Yellowstone Club, a private resort in Big Sky Montana.

In late 2010, Miller presented 'An Evening with Warren Miller' to two sold-out audiences at Seattle's Benaroya Hall. In September 2016, Miller self-published his autobiography, Freedom Found: My Life Story.

== Legacy ==
Miller was inducted into the U.S. Ski Hall of Fame (1978), the Colorado Ski Hall of Fame (1995), and was awarded Lifetime Achievement Awards from the International Skiing History Association (2004) and the California Ski Industry Association (2008).

His former company has continued to produce a new film every year carrying on the brand legacy after Warren's passing in 2018 at the age of 93. In January 2023, Outside announced a two-year film project leading into the 75th anniversary of the films. Despite reports and internet hearsay including rumors from longtime Warren Miller collaborator, Chris Patterson, that in 2023 there would not be new Warren Miller film. Warren Miller films corrected rumors and released the 74th film "All Time" in October 2023 and included both historical footage and newly filmed segments shot in Palisades Tahoe, California and Park City, Utah.

== Personal life ==
Miller's first wife, Jean, died of cancer in 1953, when their son was one year old. Miller married Dorothy Marion Roberts in 1957. They had two children. They were married for twenty years and lived in Hermosa Beach, California, where Warren Miller Entertainment was located. Miller then married two other people before marrying Laurie Penketh Kaufmann in 1988. With Laurie, Miller lived on Orcas Island, Washington, from 1992 until his death on January 24, 2018.

== Filmography ==
Movies released since 2004, while bearing Warren Miller's name, were not directed by Warren Miller, nor was he involved in their production in any way.

Year	Title
1950	Deep And Light
1951	California Skis
1952	Wandering Skis
1953	Ski Fantasy
1954	Symphony On Skis
1955	Invitation To Skiing
1956	Have Skis, Will Travel
1957	Anyone For Skiing?
1958	Are Your Skis On Straight?
1959	Let's Go Skiing
1960	Swinging Skis
1961	Many Moods Of Skiing
1962	Around The World On Skis
1963	The Sound Of Skiing
1964	The Skiers
1965	The Big Ski Show
1966	Ski On The Wild Side
1967	The Ski Scene
1968	No Boundaries
1969	This Is Skiing
1970	Sound Of Winter
1971	Any Snow, Any Mountain
1972	Winter People
1973	Skiing's Great
1974	The Color Of Skiing
1975	There Comes A Time
1976	Skiing On My Mind
1977	In Search Of Skiing
1978	Ski A La Carte
1979	Winter Fever
1980	Ski People
1981	Ski In The Sun
1982	Snowonder
1983	Ski Time
1983	Hot Yachts, Cold Water
1984	Ski Country
1985	Steep And Deep
1986	Beyond The Edge
1987	White Winter Heat
1988	Escape To Ski
1989	White Magic
1990	Extreme Winter
1991	Born To Ski
1992	Steeper And Deeper
1993	Black Diamond Rush
1994	Vertical Reality
1995	Endless Winter
1996	Snowriders
1997	Snowriders 2
1998	Freeriders
1999	Fifty
2000	Ride
2001	Cold Fusion
2002	Storm
2003	Journey
2004	Impact

== Bibliography ==
- On Film in Print (1994) Vail, CO: Ritem and Printem ISBN 978-0963614414
- Lurching from One Near Disaster to the Next (1998) Deer Harbor, WA: Pole Pass Pub. ISBN 978-0963614421
- Wine, Women, Warren, & Skis, (2001) Warren Miller Productions; 14th edition; ISBN 978-0963614407
- Warren's World, (2002) Mountain Sports Press, ISBN 978-0967674780
- "The Good New Days" Ski (Jan 2004) Vol 68 #5:152
- "A Taste of Freedom" The Ski Journal (2010) vol 4.2 ISSN 1935-3219
- Bigford, Andy and Miller, Warren (2016) Freedom Found: My Life Story Warren Miller Company ISBN 9780963614469
