= Lake Tahoe Preparatory School =

Coordinates: 39°12′19″N 120°12′17″W

Location
- 255 Olympic Vly Rd; Olympic Valley, California, California; United States

Information
- Type: Independent, coeducational, boarding school and college preparatory school
- Established: 1978
- Founder: Donald Rees
- Chairman: Bill Grant
- Campus: 3 dormitory buildings on 2.8 acres
- Colors: Navy and gold
- Mascot: Black bear
- Website: Lake Tahoe Preparatory School

Lake Tahoe Preparatory School (formerly known as Squaw Valley Academy) is an independent, coeducational, college-preparatory boarding school located in Olympic Valley, California. Established in 1978 by Donald Rees, the school aims to provide a supportive academic environment with a focus on individualized learning and meaningful student-faculty relationships. Situated on 2.8 acres near the Palisades Tahoe and Alpine Meadows ski resorts, the school integrates academics with outdoor activities.

== About ==
Founded in 1978 as “Squaw Valley Academy”, Lake Tahoe Preparatory School was renamed in 2020 to reflect its connection to the Lake Tahoe region, and removed the use of a racist term for Native American women. Located in Olympic Valley, California, this college-preparatory boarding school serves approximately 60 students with a low student-to-teacher ratio. The school has small class sizes and students have access to skiing and snowboarding at Palisades Tahoe and Alpine Meadows. With a focus on preparing students for college, the school aims to encourage confidence, leadership, and students’ engagement in learning.

== Academics ==
The school's primary focus is on college preparation for high school students (although this statement is controversial).

The school provides Advanced Placement (AP) courses, ESL for international students, an Academic Learning Center for struggling students, college counseling and SAT prep. It is also a Certified SAT testing location.

Students eat breakfast before attending morning classes Monday through Friday, eat lunch, and depart campus for supervised afternoon activities. They return to campus for dinner, and after a brief rest, they gather for mandatory, two-hour study hall, Sunday through Thursday nights. Students use study hall to finish their coursework from the day, prepare for the coming class the following day, write and research reports, and gain further instruction on course topics from teachers.

== Athletics ==
The school mascot is the brown bear. Students may participate in intramural soccer. Students who wish to compete on a recreational level may participate in programs affiliated with Palisades Tahoe

Due to the location of the school, students who meet or exceed set academic standards may ski or snowboard daily at Tahoe Palisades ski resort. The school encourages students to "ride" (ski or snowboard) at the resort of their choice, and makes arrangements to transport and supervise students.

== Campus ==
The 2.8-acre campus in Olympic Valley, California, has five buildings: three dormitory buildings with ground-level classrooms and offices, an administrative building with a dining hall and additional classrooms, and a maintenance building. Located two miles from ski resort Palisades Tahoe and under five miles from Alpine Meadows, the school gives students access to outdoor activities, including skiing and snowboarding, which are used for the school's extracurricular activities.

== Community Engagement ==
Lake Tahoe Preparatory School is engaged with the local Lake Tahoe community, offering students opportunities to build social skills and confidence through extracurricular activities and community involvement.
