= Rim Nordic Ski Area =

Ski area

- Interactive map of Rim Nordic Ski Area
- Location: San Bernardino Mountains
- Nearest city: Running Springs, California
- Coordinates: 34°13′32.16″N 117°2′27.24″W
- Base elevation: 6,775 feet (2,065 m)
- Skiable area: 10 miles (16 km)
- Trails: 7 for cross-country skiing and 2 for snowshoes only 45% Beginner; 22% Intermediate 33% Expert
- Lift system: None
- Night skiing: No
- Website: http://rimnordic.com

Rim Nordic is a cross-country ski area in the San Bernardino National Forest. It is located on Hwy. 18 or Rim of the World Drive about 5 miles after the town of Running Springs heading to Big Bear Lake, California. The entrance to the park is just across from the Snow Valley Mountain Resort. Trails exclusively for snowshoeing are also offered at the park. Equipment rentals and skiing lessons as well as snacks are provided at the retail shop.

During summer months, the area is open for mountain biking and regularly hosts bicycle racing events sanctioned by the USA Cycling.

Rim Nordic is a member of the Cross Country Ski Area Association of North America and operates under Special Permit provided by the United States Forest Service.
