= January 31 – February 3, 2021 nor'easter =

Winter storm

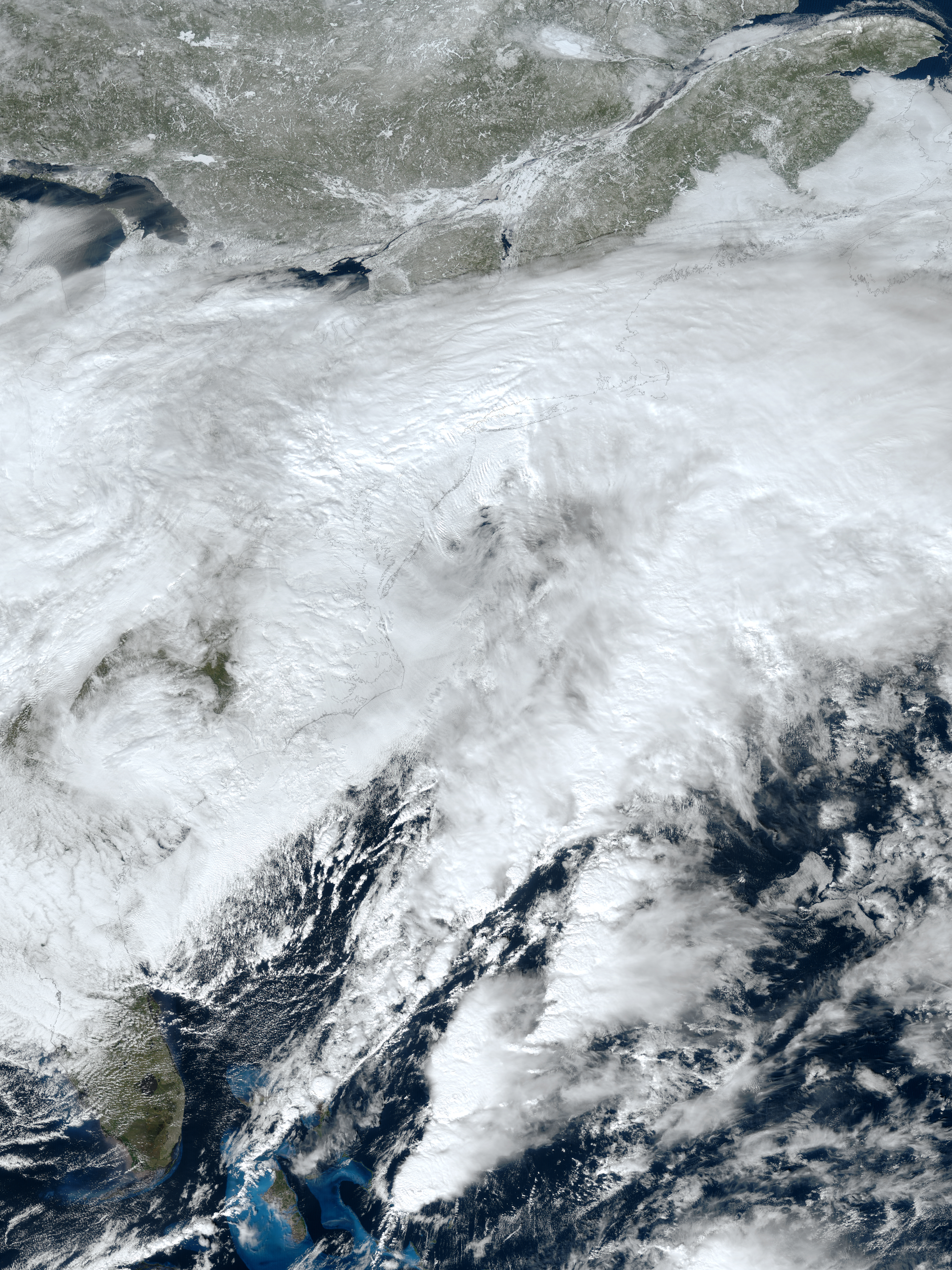
- GOES-16 satellite image of the nor'easter impacting the Northeastern United States at 18:00 UTC (1:00 p.m. EST) on February 1

Meteorological history
- Formed: January 25, 2021
- Exited land: February 3, 2021
- Dissipated: February 5, 2021

Category 3 "Major" winter storm
- Regional snowfall index: 6.19 (NOAA)
- Highest winds: 65 mph (100 km/h) (1-minute sustained winds)
- Highest gusts: 125 mph (201 km/h) at Alpine Meadows, California (western U.S.); 100 mph (160 km/h) at Mount Washington, New Hampshire (eastern U.S.)
- Lowest pressure: 984 mbar (hPa); 29.06 inHg
- Max. rainfall: 16 in (41 cm) at Chalk City, California
- Max. snowfall: Snow – 107 in (270 cm) at Mammoth Mountain Ski Area, California (western U.S.); 36.9 in (94 cm) in Mount Pocono, Pennsylvania (eastern U.S.); Ice – 0.33 in (0.84 cm) in Birdsville, Maryland

Tornado outbreak
- Tornadoes: 4
- Max. rating: EFU tornado

Overall effects
- Fatalities: 6 direct, 1 indirect
- Damage: > $1.85 billion (2021 USD)
- Areas affected: Western United States, Central United States, Mid-Atlantic states, Northeastern United States, Southeastern United States, Eastern Canada
- Power outages: > 575,000
- Part of the 2020–21 North American winter

From January 31 to February 3, 2021, a powerful, severe, and erratic nor'easter, referred to as the 2021 Groundhog Day nor'easter and unofficially named Winter Storm Orlena by the Weather Channel, impacted much of the Northeastern United States and Eastern Canada from February 1–3 with heavy snowfall, blizzard conditions, strong gusty winds, storm surge, and coastal flooding. The storm first developed as an extratropical cyclone off the West Coast of the United States on January 25, with the storm sending a powerful atmospheric river into West Coast states such as California, where very heavy rainfall, snowfall, and strong wind gusts were recorded, causing several hundred thousand power outages and numerous mudslides. The system moved ashore several days later, moving into the Midwest and dropping several inches of snow across the region. On February 1, the system developed into a nor'easter off the coast of the Northeastern U.S., bringing prolific amounts of snowfall to the region. Large metropolitan areas such as Boston and New York City saw as much as 18–24 inches (46–61 cm) of snow accumulations from January 31 to February 2, making it the worst snowstorm to affect the megalopolis since the January 2016 blizzard.

Several states deployed snow equipment and many winter weather alerts were issued in advance of the storm, and several major cities issued snow emergencies. The state of New Jersey and the cities of New York City and Boston declared states of emergencies ahead of the storm and cancelled in-person schools for many, and dozens of flights were cancelled as well. The storm directly caused at least six deaths and indirectly caused the death of one, and is estimated to have caused over $1.85 billion (2021 USD) in damages. The nor'easter was ranked as a Category 3 winter storm on the Regional Snowfall Index (RSI) scale.

== Meteorological history ==
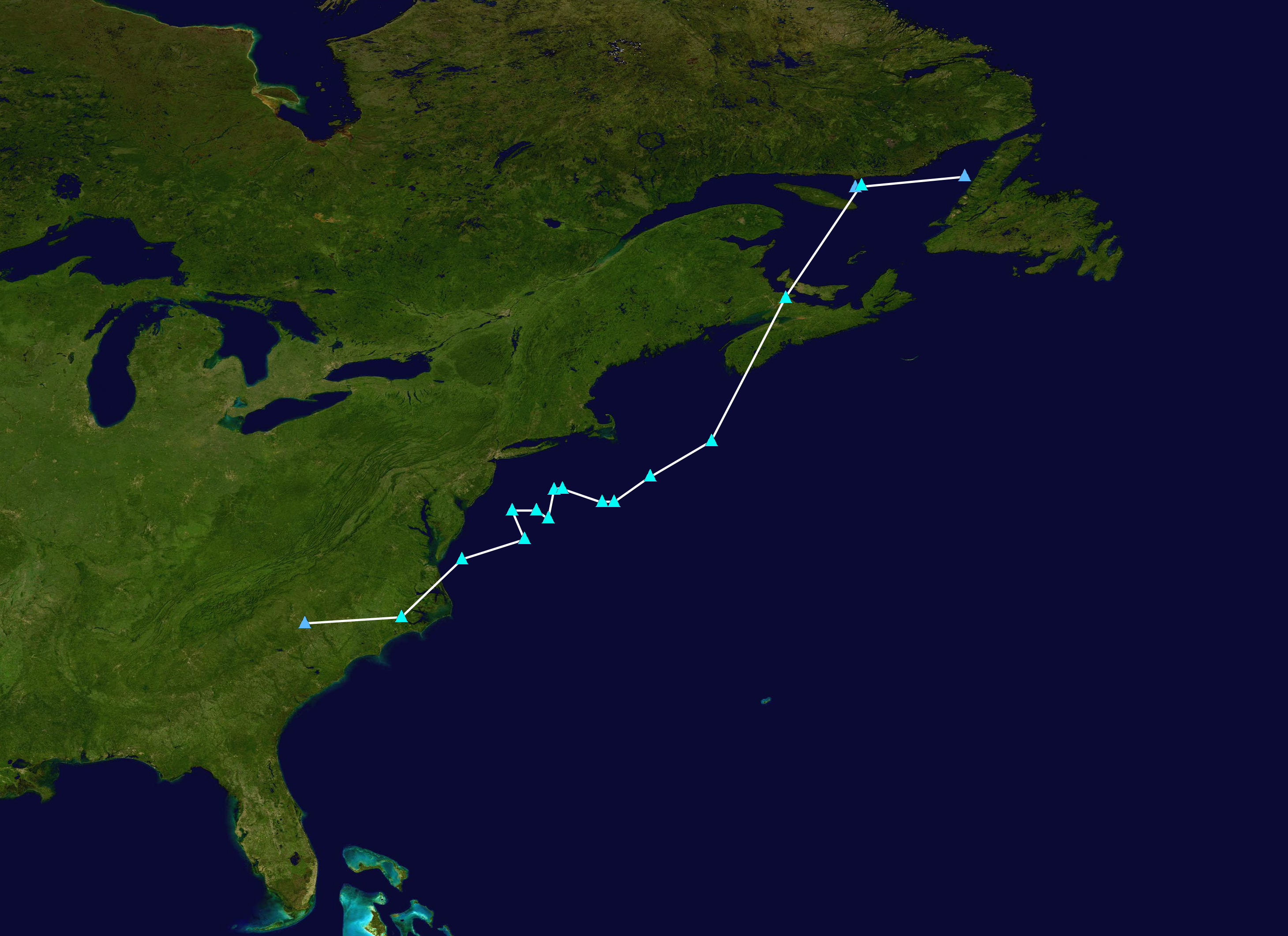
Map plotting the storm's track and intensity, according to the Saffir–Simpson scale Map key Saffir–Simpson scale Tropical depression (≤38 mph, ≤62 km/h) Tropical storm (39–73 mph, 63–118 km/h) Category 1 (74–95 mph, 119–153 km/h) Category 2 (96–110 mph, 154–177 km/h) Category 3 (111–129 mph, 178–208 km/h) Category 4 (130–156 mph, 209–251 km/h) Category 5 (≥157 mph, ≥252 km/h) Unknown Storm type Tropical cyclone Subtropical cyclone Extratropical cyclone, remnant low, tropical disturbance, or monsoon depression

In late January 2021, an extratropical cyclone developed in the Northeastern Pacific Ocean, to the south of Alaska. The system subsequently occluded and strengthened, reaching a peak intensity of 984 millibars (29.1 inHg) at 18:00 UTC on January 26, before gradually weakening, while slowly moving southeastward. The system drew moisture northeastward from the North Central Pacific towards the West Coast of the United States in a phenomenon known as the Pineapple Express, an atmospheric river known to affect the West Coast of the United States for periods of time during the winter. The main focus of this plume of moisture was directed towards the state of California on January 26, bringing heavy amounts of rain and snow. By 15:00 UTC, the Weather Prediction Center (WPC) began issuing storm summary bulletins for the storm, as it was impacting California. On January 27, the storm began moving towards the West Coast, with the storm's trough and cold front reaching the coasts of Oregon and Northern California, channeling a large atmospheric river into California in the process, triggering a Category 2 Atmospheric River event for California (based on a scaling system devised by the Scripps Institution of Oceanography that ranks atmospheric river events from 1 to 5). The low-pressure system responsible slowly moved eastward near the coastline, prolonging impacts until it moved inland early on January 29, in a weakened state. During this time, the storm's cold front and the atmospheric river gradually moved southward, reaching Southern California by 00:00 UTC on January 29, increasing the intensity of the precipitation in the southern part of the state. The storm continued moving eastward towards the Rocky Mountains while weakening, and later on January 29, the WPC terminated storm summary bulletins for the storm over the West Coast, as impacts had generally diminished.

Radar loop of the winter storm moving through the Midwestern United States on January 30–31

The remaining energy from the storm, associated with a dip in the jet stream known as a shortwave trough, moved eastward through the mountainous terrain, helping to generate a new surface low in the early morning hours of January 30, over the state of Kansas, which eventually became the dominant low. On January 30, The Weather Channel gave the storm the name Orlena, given its expected impacts. The storm slowly deepened as it moved eastward, with precipitation, initially primarily rain, blossoming over a large area as a result. Snowfall eventually broke out within the northern part of the disturbance on January 30, as it encountered colder air over the Midwest, dropping a swath of 8–12 inches (20–30 cm) across the region. On January 31, with the forecast of the development of a new coastal low expected later that night, the WPC began issuing storm summary bulletins again at 15:00 UTC for the second phase of the winter storm. As wintry precipitation began dissipating over the Midwest and Ohio Valley while expanding into the Mid-Atlantic states, a new area of low pressure began developing over the Carolinas as energy transferred to the coast.

This new low-pressure center soon became the dominant low in the storm. Throughout the next day on February 1, the system intensified and evolved into a nor'easter off the East Coast of the United States, as it moved northeastward, with baroclinic forcing increasing, producing intense snowbands occurring as a result – snowfall rates approached 1–2 inches (2.5–5.1 cm) an hour within the mesoscale features near the New York City metro area. Later that day, the storm stalled off the coast of New Jersey while the central pressure dropped to 990 millibars (29 inHg) by 12:00 UTC on February 2. Competing centers of circulation elongated the system while it resumed its northeastward motion. By 12:00 UTC on February 3, the storm reached a secondary peak, at a minimum pressure of 985 millibars (29.1 inHg), as it neared Nova Scotia. Afterward, the nor'easter gradually began to weaken, as it slowly moved away from the Northeastern United States; consequently, the WPC terminated storm summary bulletins at 10:00 AM EST that day (15:00 UTC), as most of the snow had tapered off in the Mid-Atlantic. The storm became increasingly disorganized, with multiple areas of low pressure revolving around a broad center, with the storm briefly developing a tertiary low near the Gulf of Maine. Weakening continued as the nor'easter moved over Eastern Canada, with the tertiary low dissipating by 00:00 UTC on February 4. On February 4, the older low-pressure center became the dominant low in the storm once again, and the storm split in half, with the newer storm racing eastward across the North Atlantic. Over the next day, the storm moved over Newfoundland and turned eastward, while continuing to weaken, before dissipating late on February 5.

== Preparations ==
All warnings and advisories issued in the Midwestern and Northeastern United States due to the storm
Winter Storm Warning
Winter Storm Watch
Winter Weather Advisory
Coastal Flood Advisory
High Wind Warning

=== Western United States ===
The National Weather Service issued a Winter Storm Warning for all areas above 6,500 feet (2,000 meters) in Nevada. Nevada Governor Steve Sisolak ordered all state offices in Northern Nevada to open 2 hours later than usual. Across California, numerous flood watches and winter weather alerts, and high wind alerts were issued, in anticipation of the coming impacts from the storm. The California Highway Patrol closed a 75-mile stretch of Interstate 80 due to multiple spinouts. A total of eight states in the Western United States had watches and warnings of various types issued ahead of the storm.

=== Midwest and Ohio Valley ===
The Illinois Emergency Management Agency in Illinois urged residents to make preparations for the winter storm on January 29, and to check on neighbors to make sure they received the necessary preparations as well. The city of Chicago, Illinois and surrounding areas were placed under a Winter Storm Warning on January 29 with expectations of up to 8–12 inches (20–30 cm) of snow. The city also deployed about 300 salt spreaders and snow plows as the winter storm continued throughout the evening of January 30. 100 flights out of the city were cancelled. Statewide, the Illinois Department of Transportation had more than 1,800 equipment trucks available at will for the storm.

In Indiana, a full call out for plow trucks was issued by the Indiana Department of Transportation on January 29 for the northern half of the state. The department also called for drivers to drive slower than normal, due to the wintry weather.

Crews within Ohio pretreated roads on January 30, as much of the central parts of the state were placed under Winter Storm Warnings, with up to 8 inches (20 cm) of snow expected.

=== Northeast ===
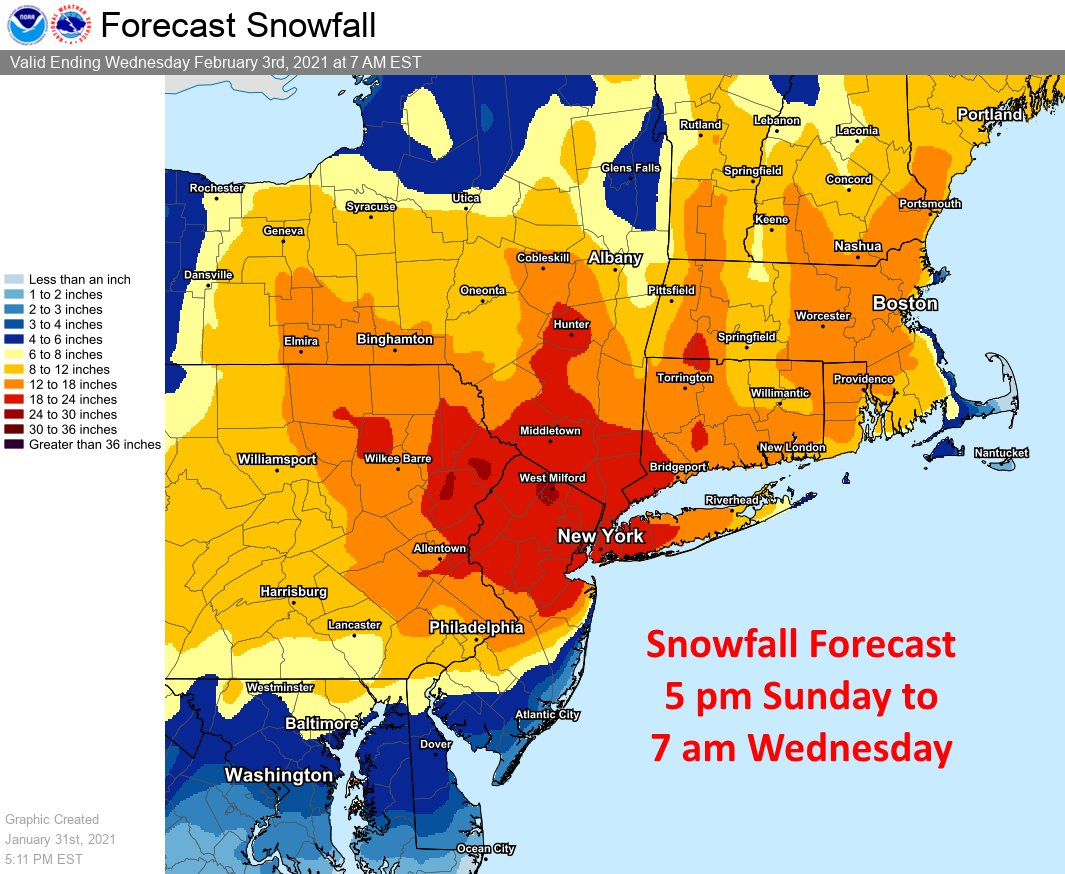
Snowfall forecast for the Northeastern United States issued late on January 31

Amtrak operated a modified schedule in the Northeast on February 1, with the Northeast Regional, Keystone Service, and Empire Service running on a limited schedule and the Acela and Pennsylvanian cancelled. At 3 p.m. on February 1, service was suspended between New York City and Boston and between New York City and Albany. On February 2, Amtrak will operate modified service on the Acela, Northeast Regional, Keystone Service, and Empire Service routes.

In Pennsylvania, Governor Tom Wolf issued a disaster emergency due to the storm. The Pennsylvania Department of Transportation enacted restrictions on the speed limit on several interstates and highways on January 31 within the Susquehanna Valley, including I-81, I-83, I-283, and I-78. Speed limits were also reduced on highways in the Philadelphia area including I-76, I-95, I-295, I-476, I-676, US 1, US 30, US 202, US 422, PA 63, PA 100, and PA 309. Commercial vehicle and speed restrictions were implemented on several highways in northeastern Pennsylvania including all or part of I-78, I-80, I-84, I-380, I-476, US 22, and PA 33. A snow emergency went into effect for the city of Philadelphia on January 31. City offices were closed and trash and recycling collection were suspended on February 1. In the cities of Levittown and Bristol Township, city officials declared a snow emergency starting at 6 p.m. on January 31 and effective for 36 hours. Several cities within the state began readying salt spreaders and snow plowers the day before as well. In Reading, BARTA bus service was suspended on February 1 and February 2, due to the storm.

Governor Phil Murphy of New Jersey declared a state of emergency for the state on January 31, as New Jersey was expected to bear the brunt of the nor'easter, with up to 1–2 feet (12–24 in; 30–61 cm) of snow being expected across a large majority of the state. Civil offices would also be closed for the following day. Murphy also stated that all New Jersey Transit forms of transportation would be suspended systemwide during the day, with the exception of the Atlantic City Line. AirTrain Newark service was also suspended, with free shuttle bus service provided until Newark Liberty International Airport was shut down by 3 p.m. The New York City Subway suspended all outdoor subway service for the first time since the January 2016 United States blizzard, truncating numerous lines. All six COVID-19 vaccine mega-sites were also closed for February 1, with appointments to be rescheduled. The New Jersey Department of Transportation enacted travel restrictions due to the storm, focusing on many major interstate highways, including I-95, I-80 and I-78. The state also activated roughly 3,000 plows and salt spreaders to clear snow off of major highways. Utility companies also pledged their readiness to handle and restore power outages caused by the storm.

In New York, Governor Andrew Cuomo ordered state agencies to mobilize emergency response resources on January 31. He also urged residents to keep an eye on updates regarding the storm and to not travel. Travel restrictions were implemented on the New York State Thruway effective early on February 1. Mayor Bill de Blasio declared a state of emergency for New York City and ordered all schools to switch to online learning the following day. COVID-19 vaccine sites were closed as well. The nor'easter also forced outdoor dining to be cancelled. More than 2,000 plows were said to be ready to deploy, with 300,000 pounds of de-icing materials available to use.

MTA Regional Bus Operations in New York City grounded their articulated buses from January 31 to February 2. Nassau Inter-County Express buses were suspended at 1pm on February 1.

==== New England ====
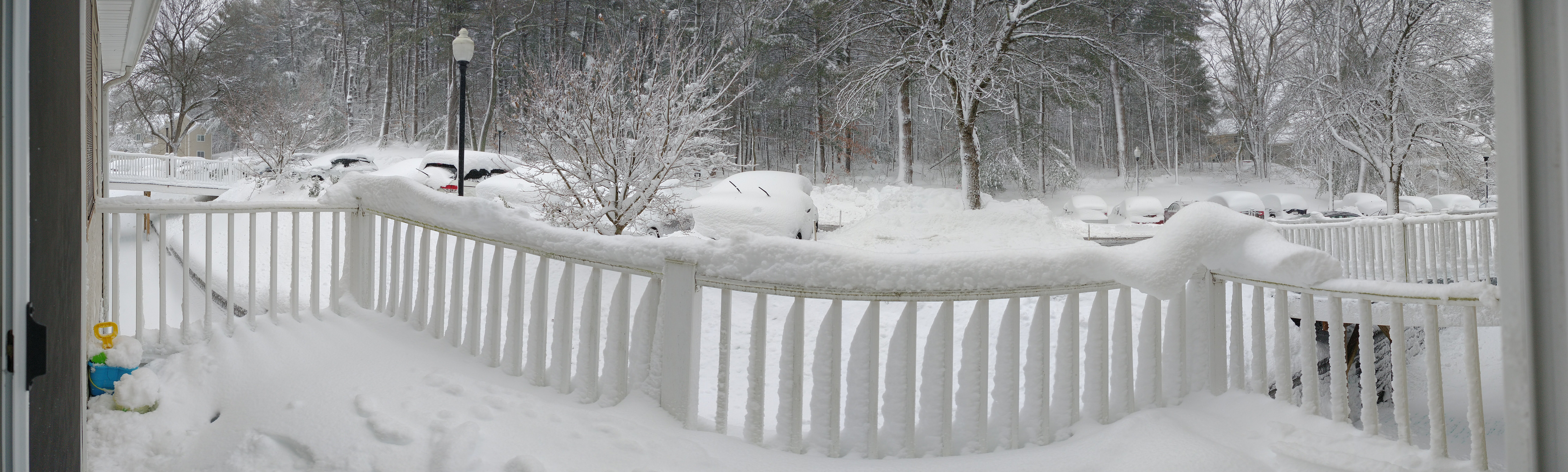
A panoramic view of 21.5 inches (55 cm) of snow from the nor'easter burying the ground in Lexington, MA on February 2

Boston Mayor Marty Walsh declared a snow emergency the day before the storm on January 31, as Winter Storm Warnings were issued in the area. Snowfall totals were expected to be 6–12 inches (15–30 cm) in the Boston area, with locally higher totals. Boston Public Schools were to be remote on February 1 and 2, and numerous school districts in the area either were to have an early dismissal or fully remote learning on February 1. Worcester, Massachusetts also announced a parking ban on February 1, because of the nor'easter. The state of Massachusetts also deployed nearly 4,000 snow removal vehicles and other services to pre-treat the roads in Massachusetts before and during the storm.

== Impact ==
=== West Coast ===
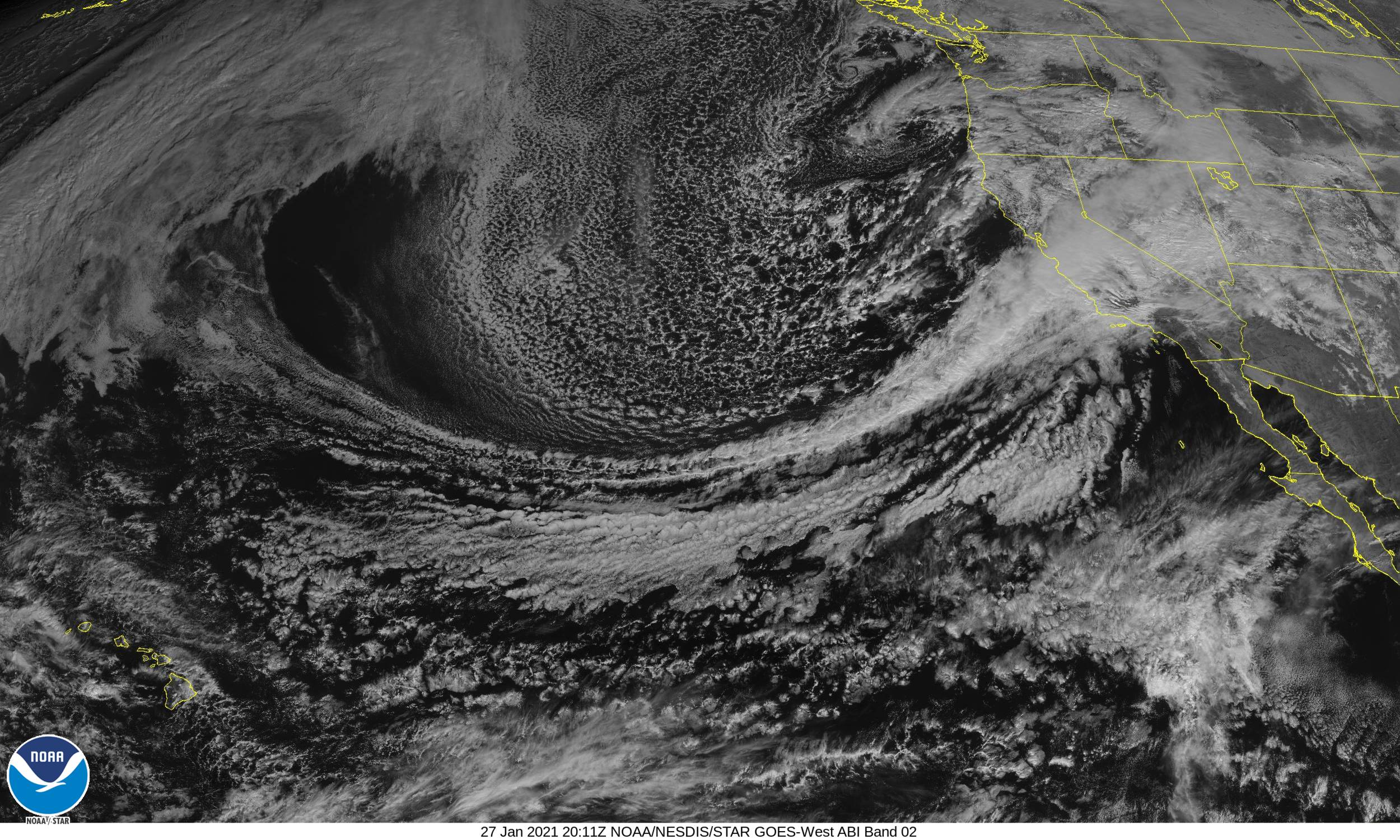
GOES-16 geostationary imagery of the winter storm impacting the West Coast on January 27

The storm had significant impacts in California from January 27 to 30, only a day after a previous winter storm had brought heavy rain and powerful winds to the same region. One person was injured in one of the mudslides in Northern California, and many structures suffered damage. The storm is blamed for the deaths of at least two people in California, with one victim having died in a flooded storm drain system near a Mexican border crossing, and the other victim being a skier who was found upside down in deep snow at Mammoth Mountain. A significant length of California State Route 1 along the Big Sur collapsed into the ocean after massive amounts of rain fell, causing a debris flow onto the highway, which in turn triggered the collapse. In Southern California, the storm triggered widespread flooding and debris flows, forcing the evacuations of thousands of people and also causing widespread property damage. Residential areas near the burn scars of wildfires from the previous year were especially at risk for flooding and mudflows. Salinas received 4 in (100 mm) of rainfall for the entire event causing mudflows that caused 7,000 people to evacuate. Across the State of California, the storm knocked out power to an estimated 575,000 people at one point, according to power outage tracking maps and PG&E. In the mountainous parts of the state, the winter storm dropped tremendous amounts of heavy snow, with Mammoth Mountain Ski Area receiving 94 in (240 cm) within 72 hours, and a total of 107 in (270 cm) of snowfall for the entire event. Blizzard conditions were also recorded on parts of the Sierra Nevada. Very high wind gusts were also observed, with gusts over 100 mph (160 km/h) observed at Alpine Meadows, peaking at 126 mph (203 km/h). Heavy snowfall at Yosemite National Park forced the entire park to close for days. The flooding in California was estimated to have caused over $1.75 billion (2021 USD) in damages.

=== Midwest and Ohio Valley ===
Ahead of the storm's arrival, winter-related watches and warnings were issued for portions of the Midwest into the northern Ohio Valley. The storm produced 10.8 and 11.3 inches of snow (27.43 and 28.7 cm) at O'Hare and Midway airports, respectively. The largest snowfall total associated with this phase of the storm was 13.5 inches (34 cm) in Racine, Wisconsin. In Chicago, the system became the largest snowstorm in 5 years.

=== Mid-Atlantic and Northeast ===
Heavy snow and near white-out conditions during the brunt of the storm in Newark, New Jersey

In Virginia, state police responded to at least 270 crashes and almost as many vehicles stuck on January 31, and four firefighters were injured after a spin-out in Richmond. In Maryland, police responded to at least 70 crashes and dozens of calls.

Washington, D.C. received its first one-inch snowfall total since February 20, 2019, with 1.4 inches (3.6 cm) (as of the afternoon of January 31) measured at the Reagan National Airport. The storm brought 7.7 inches (20 cm) of snow to Philadelphia, causing delays and cancellations of flights at Philadelphia International Airport. In Allentown, Pennsylvania, an elderly woman with Alzheimer's disease was found dead on February 1, after wandering outside of her house and freezing due to hypothermia. In Tioga County, Pennsylvania, a 42-year-old woman died in a crash, while a 69-year-old man died from crashing due to slick conditions in Bucks County, Pennsylvania. In Adamstown, Maryland, a 64-year-old man died after a recycling services truck he was riding on overturned due to an icy roadway. The Maryland State Police responded to 330 crashes, 146 disabled or unattended vehicles and 891 calls for service between 8 a.m. EST Sunday and 5 a.m. EST Monday. Maryland received 20.5 inches (52 cm) at most from this nor'easter. The National Weather Service reported a total of 27.3 inches (69 cm) of snow at Lehigh Valley International Airport.

A man in Bergen County, New Jersey was killed after his vehicle caught fire. Police reported that he continuously revved his SUV's engine in an attempt to get it out of a snowbank, when the engine caught fire. On February 1, New Jersey state police reported that they had responded to over 660 vehicle crashes and over 1,000 motorist aids within the past day. New Jersey Route 35 through Belmar was closed due to flooding. The highest recorded snowfall in New Jersey was 35.5 inches (90 cm) in Mount Arlington, nearly breaking a record total from one event in the entire state.

Areas near New York City reported double-digit snowfall totals by the morning of February 1, with snowfall rates consistently over 1 inch (2.5 cm) per hour. Blizzard conditions were reported unofficially in Islip, New York, on Long Island, and later confirmed by the National Weather Service. Central Park saw its biggest snowfall since the January 2016 United States blizzard. Coastal flooding and storm surge was observed along the Jersey Shore and Long Island as well. Most flights were cancelled due to the snowstorm at all airports in and near New York City. A New York Islanders game against the Buffalo Sabres was postponed. In the Northeastern United States, the nor'easter was estimated to have caused over $100 million (2021 USD) in damages.

==== New England ====
While areas near downtown Boston reported only 1–3 inches (2.5–7.6 cm) of snow before changing to rain, the northwestern suburbs of Boston reported much higher totals. Snowfall accumulations over 18 inches (46 cm) were reported in many of these areas, with a confirmed total of 20.1 inches (51 cm) in Lowell, Massachusetts, and a preliminary total of 21.8 inches (55 cm) in Acton, Massachusetts. Worcester, Massachusetts recorded their second-highest snowfall total for February 1 on that day, with a total of 13.8 inches (35 cm) of snowfall before midnight. Further north, a road in Acadia National Park was shut down due to snow.

=== Snowfall totals ===
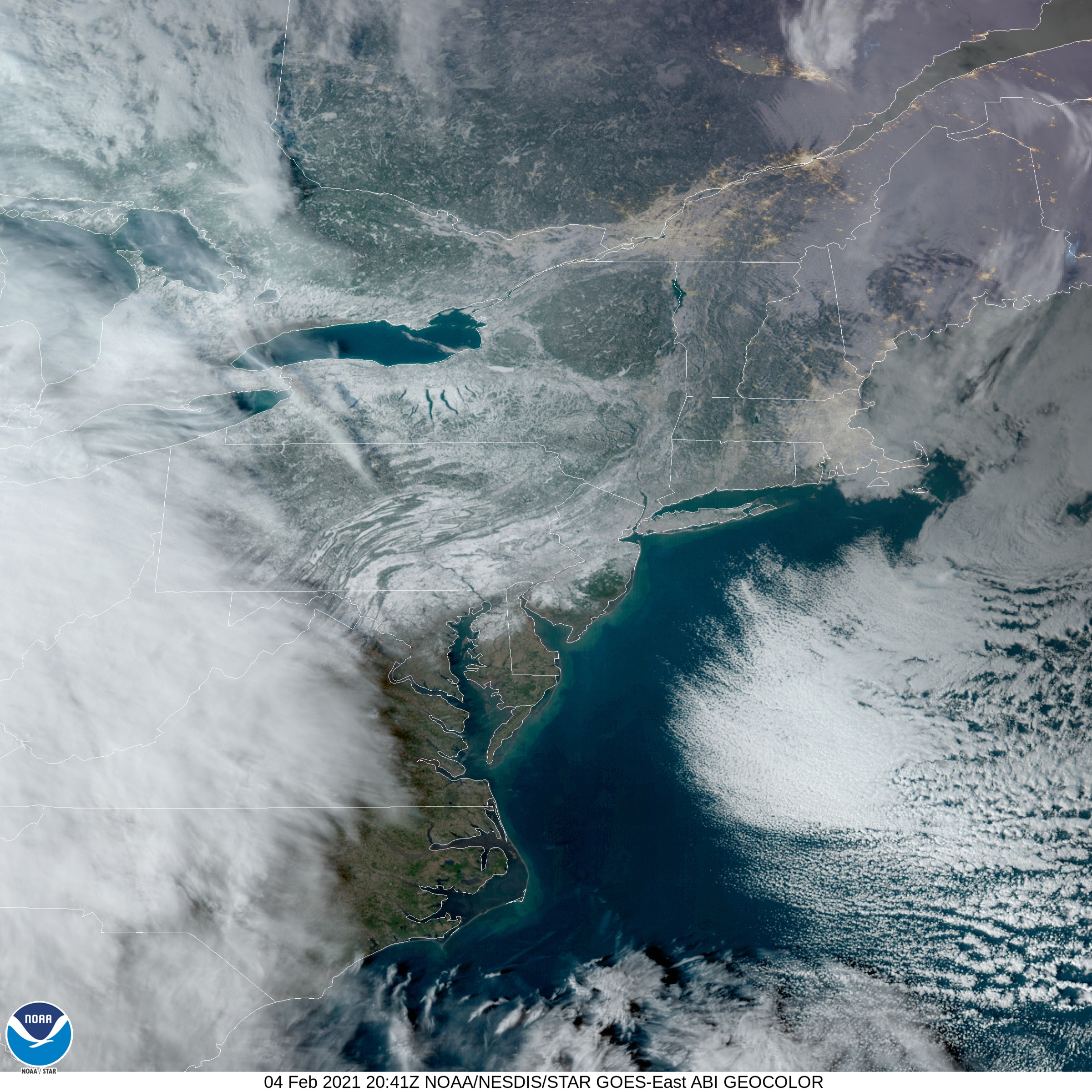
Satellite image of Northeastern U.S. snow cover following the nor'easter

Highest observed snow totals from each affected state
State	Town	Amount
Pennsylvania	Mount Pocono	36.9 inches (94 cm)
New Jersey	Mount Arlington	35.5 inches (90 cm)
New York	Fishkill	25.6 inches (65 cm)
Massachusetts	Lowell	24 inches (61 cm)
West Virginia	Terra Alta	22.1 inches (56 cm)
Maryland	Sabillasville	20.5 inches (52 cm)
Connecticut	Danbury	19 inches (48 cm)
New Hampshire	Atkinson	16 inches (41 cm)
Maine	Salem Township	15.5 inches (39 cm)
Vermont	Landgrove	15.2 inches (39 cm)
Rhode Island	North Foster	12.5 inches (32 cm)
Virginia	Berryville	10.6 inches (27 cm)
Ohio	Carmichaels	9.1 inches (23 cm)
North Carolina	Marshall	8.5 inches (22 cm)
Delaware	Woodside	6.5 inches (17 cm)
District of Columbia	Washington	4.5 inches (11 cm)

== Aftermath ==
Roughly a week later, another winter storm followed, which caused impacts before and during the day of Super Bowl LV.

== See also ==
- 2011 Groundhog Day blizzard
- February 2013 North American blizzard
- March 2013 nor'easter
- December 2014 North American storm complex
- January 2016 United States blizzard
- December 15–17, 2020 nor'easter
- October 2021 Northeast Pacific bomb cyclone – Another powerful cyclone that triggered a destructive atmospheric river event on the U.S. West Coast
