= Alterra Mountain Company =

Major ski resort owner and operator

- Type: Private
- Industry: Hospitality
- Founded: 2018; 8 years ago
- Headquarters: Denver, Colorado, U.S.
- Key people: Kelly Vohs (CEO)
- Owners: Henry Crown and Company; KSL Capital Partners
- Website: alterramtnco.com

Alterra Mountain Company is an American hospitality company founded in 2018 and headquartered in Denver, Colorado. It is privately owned by KSL Capital Partners and Henry Crown and Company, the owners of Aspen/Snowmass. It is a conglomerate of several ski resorts that offers a combined season pass.

Kelly Vohs serves as CEO of the company.

== History ==
In April 2017, KSL and Aspen jointly purchased Intrawest. This acquisition was followed by Mammoth Resorts a few days later and Deer Valley in August. All of these assets were combined with KSL's Squaw Valley and Alpine Meadows (the two ski resorts were combined and later renamed Palisades Tahoe) to form Alterra Mountain Company in January 2018.

In late January 2018, Alterra announced the Ikon Pass, a season pass that provides unlimited or restricted access to all of their ski resorts in collaboration with Alta Ski Area, Snowbasin, Arapahoe Basin, Aspen/Snowmass, Boyne Resorts, Jackson Hole Mountain Resort, Powdr Corporation, Revelstoke Mountain Resort, SkiBig3, and Snowbird. This is a competitor to Vail Resorts' Epic Pass.

In 2021, Alterra Mountain Company announced its plans to invest $207 million in capital improvements for the upcoming year, including transformational base area and on-mountain developments at Steamboat, Deer Valley Resort, Squaw Valley Alpine Meadows and Mammoth Mountain.

Jared Smith was chief executive officer from 2022 until March 2026. Kelly Vohs took over as chief executive officer on October 19, 2026.

== List of resorts ==
- Big Bear Mt. and Snow Summit merged several years before Alterra was formed. The official title is: Big Bear Mountain Resorts.

Name	Location	Date opened	Date acquired	Notes
Arapahoe Basin	(United States) Summit County, Colorado	1945	February 8th, 2024	Alterra's newest mountain, bought in 2024.
Big Bear Mountain	(United States) Big Bear Lake, California	1943	April 12, 2017	Merged with neighboring Snow Summit
Blue Mountain	(Canada) Collingwood, Ontario	1941	April 10, 2017	Third busiest ski resort in Canada
Crystal Mountain Resort	(United States) Enumclaw, Washington	1962	October 1, 2018	
Deer Valley	(United States) Park City, Utah	1981	August 21, 2017	One of three resorts in the U.S. to not allow snowboarding
June Mountain	(United States) June Lake, California	1962	April 12, 2017	
Mammoth Mountain	(United States) Mammoth Lakes, California	1955	April 12, 2017	Eighth largest lift system in North America
Snowshoe	(United States) Snowshoe, West Virginia	December 13, 1974	April 10, 2017	
Snow Valley Mountain Resort	(United States) Running Springs, California	1924	January, 2023	Merged with nearby Snow Summit and Big Bear Mountain
Solitude Mountain Resort	(United States) Solitude, Utah	1957	June 20, 2018	
Palisades Tahoe / Alpine Meadows	(United States) Olympic Valley, California; Alpine Meadows, California	1949	—N/a	Plans have been discussed to merge with neighboring resorts of Palisades Tahoe and Alpine Meadows incorporating a gondola that would cross White Wolf Mountain's proposed development.
Schweitzer Mountain	(United States) Sandpoint, Idaho	1963	August 22, 2023	
Steamboat	(United States) Steamboat Springs, Colorado	January 12, 1963	April 10, 2017	
Stratton	(United States) Stratton Mountain, Vermont	December 1961	April 10, 2017	First ski resort to allow snowboarding in 1983
Snow Summit	(United States) Big Bear Lake, California	1952	April 12, 2017	Merged with neighboring Big Bear Mountain
Sugarbush Resort	(United States) Warren, Vermont	December 25, 1958	November 13, 2019	Acquisition finalized January 14, 2020.
Tremblant	(Canada) Mont-Tremblant, Quebec	1938	April 10, 2017	Second busiest ski resort in Canada
Winter Park Resort	(United States) Winter Park, Colorado	1939	April 10, 2017	
