= Gary Dranow =

American skier and singer

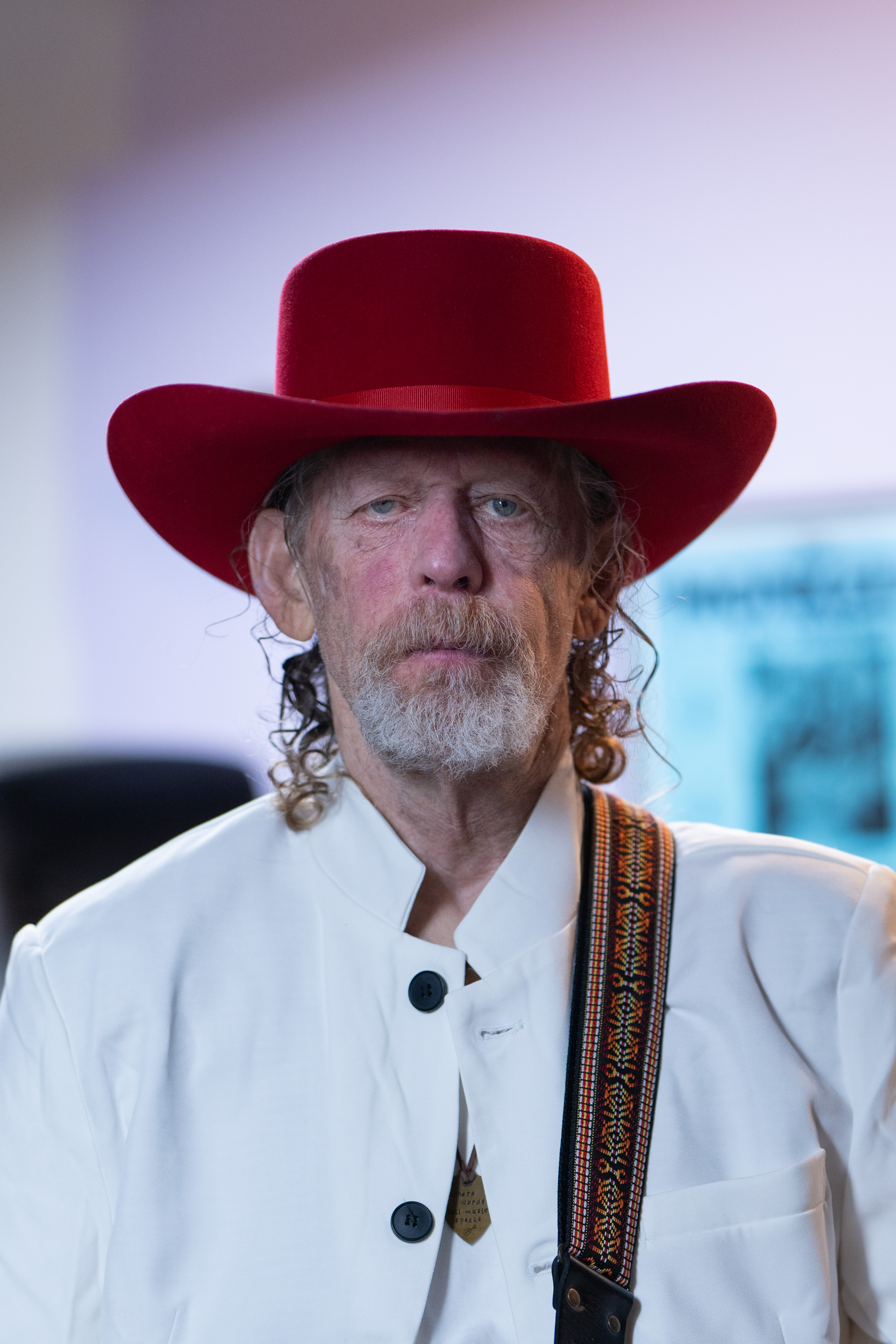

Personal information
- Born: 10 March 1954 (age 72)

Sport
- Sport: Alpine skiing, Music, Motocross, Auto racing,

Gary Dranow (born March 20, 1954) is an American former professional skier turned singer who competed in National Standard Race from 1987 to 2011. He was ranked number one in his age group nationally and in the top twenty men overall in NASTAR from the 2006 to 2010 seasons. He became a USSA-certified professional ski coach in 2007.

== Personal life ==
Dranow was born on March 10, 1954, in Santa Monica. After being married three times, he married statistician Elizabeth in 2003, making her his final spouse for 20 years shortly after relocating to Park City, Utah in 1998. After relocating to Park City, Utah, in 1998 to focus on Master Ski Racing and manage a ski-racing academy.

== Career ==
=== Motocross career ===
In 1971, Dranow won two grand slams held in Indian Dunes Park. In 1972, he won against a tough field of Open Seniors, during ACE motocross program at Indian Dunes Park. In 1972, he entered the 500 Junior competition having secured two victories in preliminary rounds.

=== Martial Art ===
Dranow was named 'The Golden Haired Executioner' for his role in the MMA sport's revival between 1972 and 1973.

=== Ski career ===
In 1971, Dranow won two MX grand slams held in Indiana Dunes Park. In 1972, he won against a tough field of MX Open Seniors, during ACE motocross program at Indiana Dunes Park.

Dranow became the highest-scoring associate certified ski instructor in 1973 and began coaching. He was hired as a ski instructor at Snow Summit for the 1973–74 ski season. He got his first USSA Alpine Coach's certification in 1981.

After leaving coaching at Snow Summit, he went on to race USSA Masters in the Far West division, with his best finish being 3rd place overall in the McCoy Cup 1986 slalom.

He qualified for the 1987 NASTAR National and participated in LA Council Elite 1 GS races from 1987 to 1990.

In 1990, he left ski racing until returning to NASTAR and Masters in the 2001–2002 ski season.

He won the NASTAR Platinum 55–59-year-old class. Dranow earned the No. 1 Skiing ranking for his age group at NASTAR in 2001.

In 2001, Dranow established Modern Ski Racing, a ski coaching in facility in Utah. He ranked third in the first Race of Champions at the 2005 National Championships at Park City Mountain. He ranked third in 2006, and second in 2007.

In 2007, he became the NASTAR age group national champion and won bronze medal in the one-run showdown of champions from all age groups.

=== Bicycle racing ===
In 1968, Dranow won the Tour of Maui Stage Race. He also won the 2007 Utah State Time Trial Championships winning in category 55–59.

Dranow suffered a neck fracture in a mountain bike incident, which resulted in four of his vertebrae being infused with titanium plate.

=== Car Racing ===
He participated in 2007 and 2008 Tire Rack SCCA Solo Nationals.

=== Music career ===
Dranow's albums "Destiny Road Rough Cuts" was initially released his first album in 2003, but the original Analog Ampex tapes, which had aged over 25 years, were obtained from his bass player, Jerry Manfredi, in Los Angeles. Dranow sent these tapes to Deep Signal Studios in Lakewood, California, where they underwent a two-week baking process to restore their viability.

Dranow and the Manic Emotions is a four-piece band. In September 2023, Dranow launched his hard rock anthem "The Cry Of War", highlighting Ukraine and Russia's war and Ukraine's fight for freedom and democracy. The song is also translated in Ukrainian.

He released an album titled "Destiny Road," in May of 2023 which was recorded in the '90s but remained unreleased until now.

Dranow released his single album "Never Give Up" in November 2024 in which he collaborated, with Chris Zoupa from Teramaze and Ukrainian singer-producer Klym Apalkov.

On December 20, 2024, the Dranow Band released Masked Facade, an album blend of rock and melodic storytelling.

In February, 2025, Gary Dranow & The Manic Emotions released the album Forever and a Day on Bandcamp.

On July 18, 2025, Flat Out was released as a single by Gary Dranow through Old Man Records.

On August 1, 2025, Gary Dranow released the single Outback Woods on Old Man Records.

In 2025, Dranow was featured in RGM Introducing, where he discussed his musical background, artistic influences, and recent projects.
