= Bear Mountain (ski area) =

Ski resort in southern California, United States

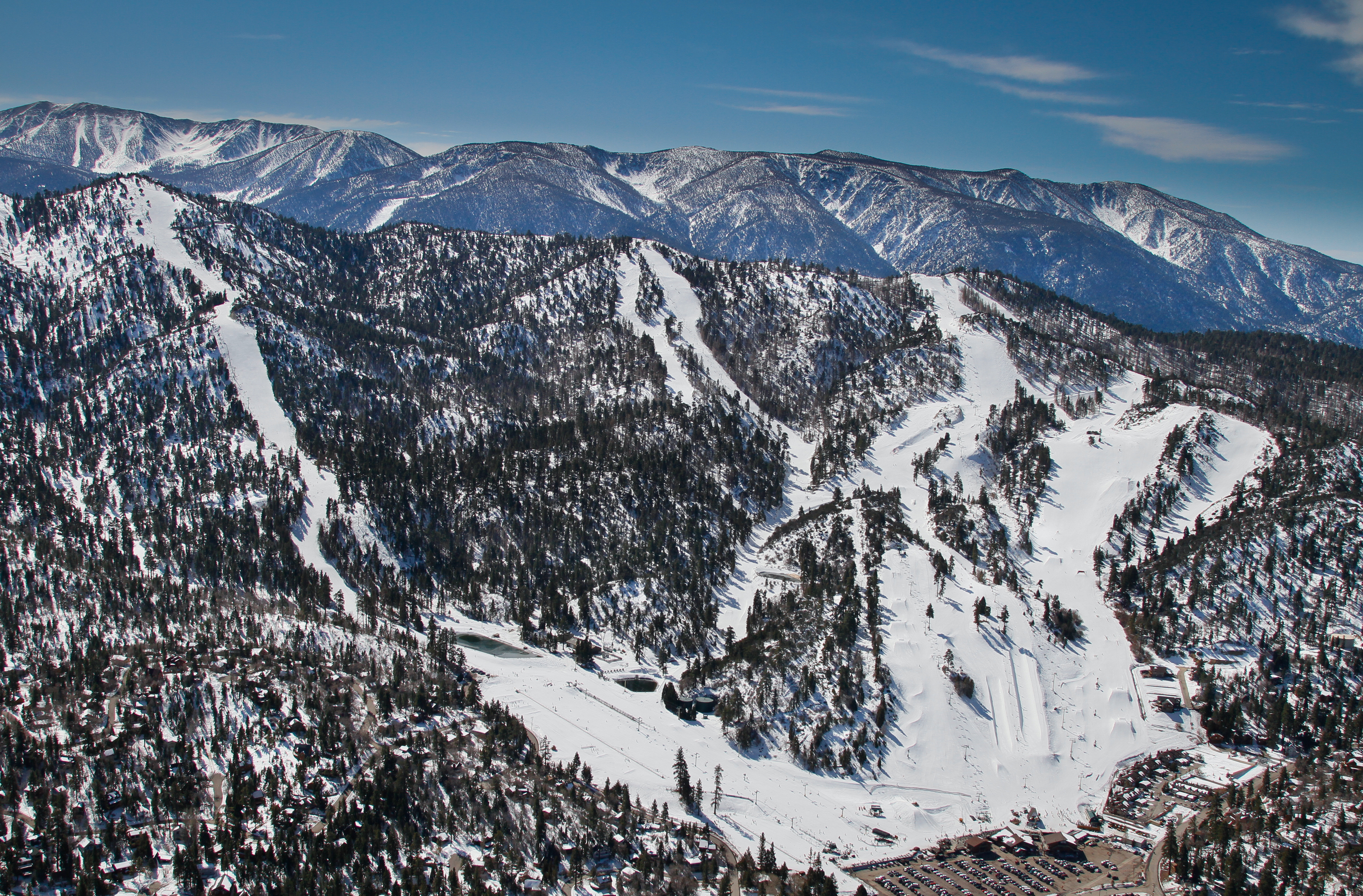
- Bear Mountain Ski Resort, Big Bear Lake, California

- Location in California Bear Mountain (the United States)
- Location: Bear Mountain; San Bernardino National Forest
- Nearest major city: Big Bear Lake, California
- Coordinates: 34.2267°N 116.8602°W
- Status: Operating
- Owner: Alterra Mountain Company
- Vertical: 1,665 ft (507 m)
- Top elevation: 8,805 ft (2,684 m)
- Base elevation: 7,140 ft (2,180 m)
- Skiable area: 198 acres (80 ha)
- Trails: 26 total 15% beginner 15% low intermediate 40% intermediate 30% advanced
- Longest run: Geronimo 1.5 mi (2.4 km)
- Lift system: 7
- Lift capacity: 16,590 skiers/hr
- Terrain parks: 13
- Snowfall: 100 in (250 cm)
- Snowmaking: Yes, 100%
- Night skiing: No
- Website: http://www.bigbearmountainresort.com/

Bear Mountain, formerly known as the Moonridge Ski Area (1943–1969), Goldmine Mountain (1970–1987), and Big Bear Mountain (1988–2001), is a ski area originally established in 1941 in the San Bernardino National Forest in Southern California, United States. It is located in the city of Big Bear Lake, approximately 2.4 miles east of Snow Summit and 14.8 miles east from Snow Valley. Together, the three ski areas are known as Big Bear Mountain Resort, which is part of Alterra Mountain Company.

== Resort ==
Bear Mountain (base: 7,140 feet, peak: 8,805 feet) has three main peaks – Bear Peak, Silver Mountain, and Goldmine Mountain – that receive an average of 100 inches (250 cm) of natural snowfall during the winter. Like many North American ski resorts, the mountain relies on artificial snowmaking during the early part of the ski and snowboard season until the natural snowfall arrives. Known for its youthful atmosphere and progressive terrain, Bear Mountain established the first freestyle terrain park in North America (Outlaw, 1992) and is home to the largest learning areas, highest lift-served peak (Geronimo, 8,805 feet), and only halfpipes in Southern California.

In 1988, the ski area was acquired by S-K-I Limited and renamed Big Bear Mountain. The mountain was sold again in 1995 to Fibreboard Corp. and 1996 to Booth Creek, Inc. In 2002, Snow Summit acquired Big Bear Mountain and changed its name to Bear Mountain. In 2014, both ski areas were bought by Mammoth Resorts (owned by Starwood Capital Group) for $38 million to pair with Mammoth Mountain and June Mountain. The following year, management and operations of Bear Mountain and Snow Summit were consolidated under the Big Bear Mountain Resort brand with each mountain retaining its own identity. In 2017, Starwood announced the sale of Mammoth Resorts to a partnership led by Aspen Skiing Company and KSL Capital Partners that became Alterra Mountain Company.

== Bear Mountain trails ==
Beginner	Intermediate	Difficult	Expert
Learning Curve	Accelerator	Exhibition	Geronimo
Easy Street	Ripcord	Rip's Run	The Wedge (moguls)
Amusement Park	Upper Park Run	Outlaw
The Gulch	Silver Connection	Showtime
Lower Park Run	Boneyard	Gambler
Hidden Valley	Expressway	Grizzly
Backdoors	Central Park
Inspriation	Pipeline
	Outlaw's Alley
	Street Scene
	Park Run Face
	Pipeline
