= Alpine Meadows (ski resort) =

Ski resort in Lake Tahoe, California

- Location in the United States
- Location: Ward Peak; Tahoe National Forest, Placer County, California
- Nearest major city: Tahoe City, Truckee
- Coordinates: 39.164°N 120.239°W
- Vertical: 1,802 ft (549 m)
- Top elevation: 8,637 ft (2,633 m)
- Base elevation: 6,835 ft (2,083 m)
- Skiable area: 2,400 acres (9.7 km^{2})
- Trails: 100 total: 25% beginner; 40% intermediate; 35% advanced
- Longest run: 3.4 miles (5.5 km)
- Lift system: 12 lifts
- Terrain parks: 1
- Snowfall: 495 in (1,260 cm)
- Snowmaking: 11 of 13 lifts
- Website: www.palisadestahoe.com

Alpine Meadows is a ski resort in the western United States, located in Alpine Meadows, California. Near the northwest shore of Lake Tahoe, it offers 2,400 acres (9.7 km^{2}) of skiable terrain, 13 different lifts, and a vertical drop of 1,802 feet (549 m).

In 2018, Alpine Meadows was merged into the Alterra Mountain Company. Today, the two resorts operate as one with a single-season pass as Palisades Tahoe with a gondola connecting the two base areas.

== History ==
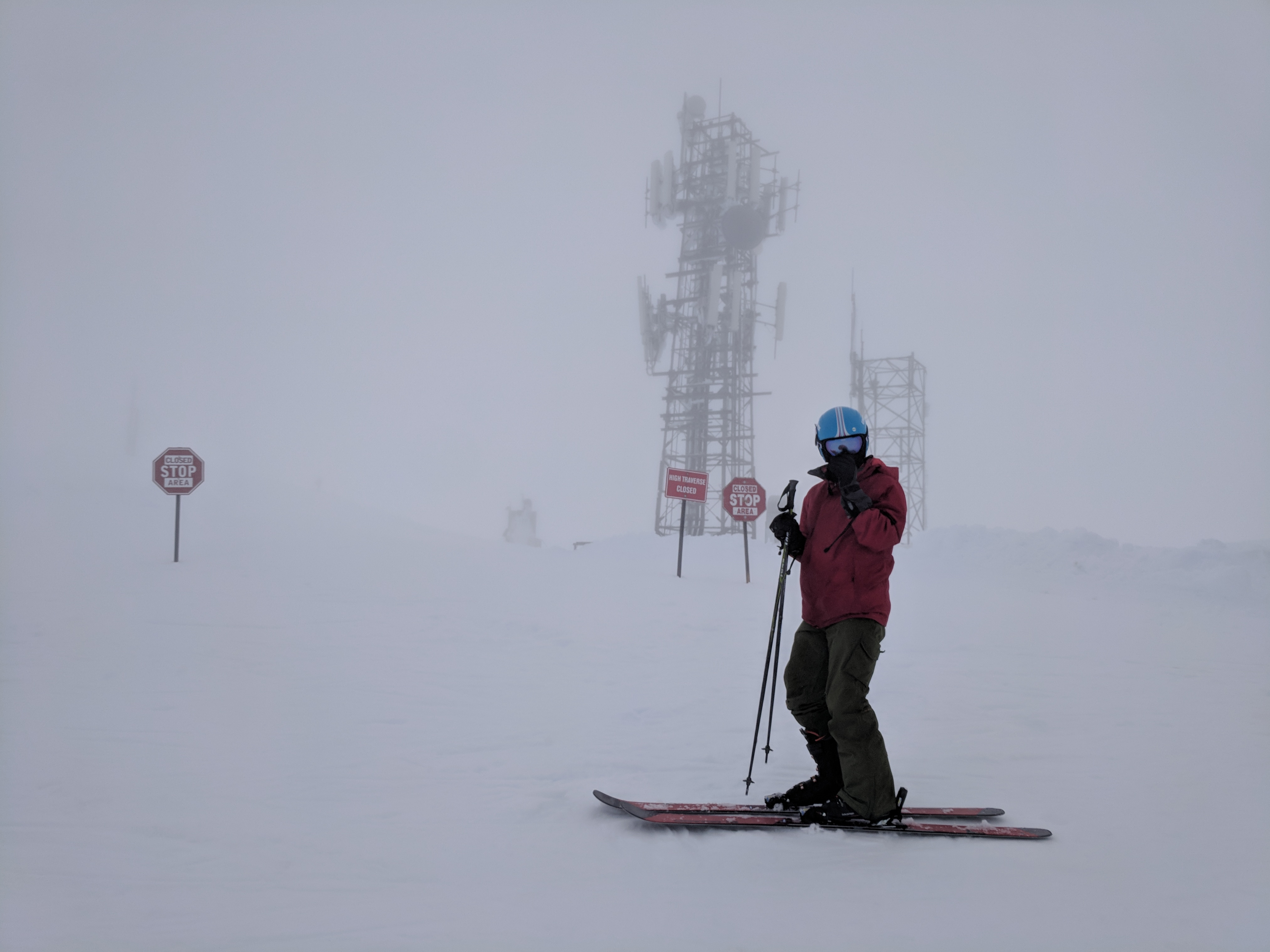
Peak of Summit Chair

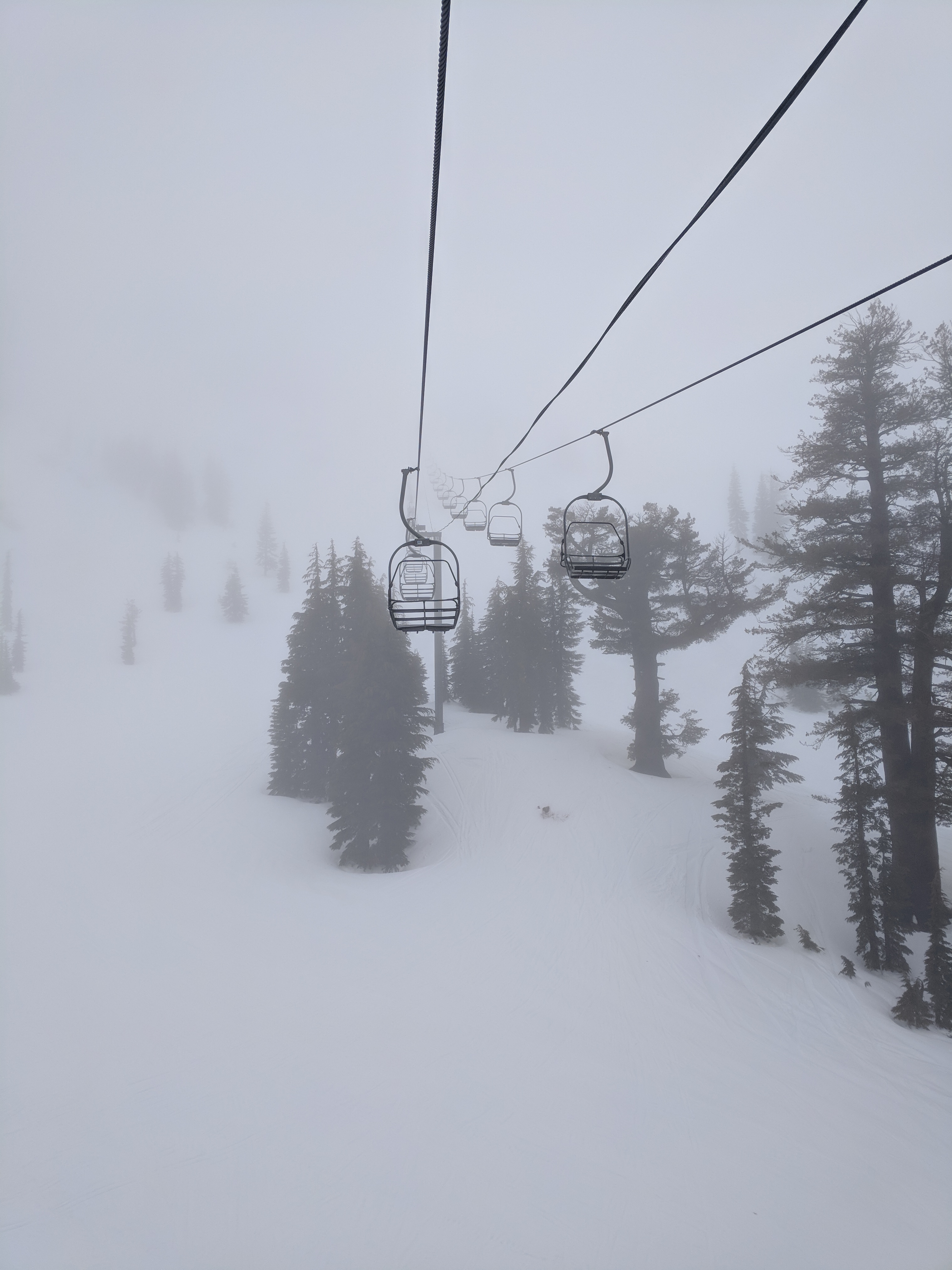
Alpine Bowl Chairlift

Alpine Meadows opened 65 years ago in 1961. John Reily developed it initially as the Ward Peak Ski Resort, and had a vision to develop the terrain into a ski resort as an alternative to Squaw Valley. With the help of Peter Klaussen and a number of families who pooled resources to develop the area, Alpine Meadows was founded in 1958 and opened in 1961. The idea for the resort was to focus more on the pleasure of skiing than business profit. It was thought that the idea for the resort came about after the resort's founders visited Squaw Valley during the 1960 Olympics and noticed the potential of the adjacent terrain. Alpine Meadows opened for the 1961–62 season with three lifts.

JMA Ventures, owner of the Homewood Mountain Resort on the west shore of Lake Tahoe, purchased Alpine Meadows from Powdr Corporation in July 2007. In 2011, Alpine Meadows merged with the well-known neighboring ski resort and 1960 Olympic site, Squaw Valley. Ownership transferred largely to the umbrella company Squaw Valley Ski Holdings, LLC.

== 1982 Avalanche ==
A major avalanche occurred at the Alpine Meadows Resort in the early spring of 1982 after days of intense storms. The avalanche impacted the base area of the resort in the late afternoon of March 31 resulting in the deaths of seven individuals. One person, Alpine Meadows employee Anna Conrad, was successfully extracted from the debris by search and rescue teams after being trapped for five days inside a collapsed resort building. Conrad was found in part due to the use of search and rescue dogs, making her the first avalanche survivor to be rescued using search dogs in the United States. The resort and avalanche are featured in a documentary titled Buried: The 1982 Alpine Meadows Avalanche.

== Movie location ==
Alpine Meadows was featured as the location of the fictional "Alpine College" in the movie Wild Wild Winter. Portions of the movie, including all exterior sequences, were filmed at the resort.

== Jamaican ski team ==
Alpine Meadows is a partnership inspired by Errol Kerr, a resident of Truckee who has U.S. and Jamaican citizenship. Kerr represented Jamaica in the 2010 Winter Olympics.

== Squaw Valley merger and gondola controversies ==
In September 2011, Alpine Meadows and Squaw Valley Ski Resort merged under common management led by Squaw Valley's parent company, KSL Capital Partners. Alpine Meadows’ parent, JMA Ventures, owns a smaller part. The new umbrella entity over both resorts will be known as Squaw Valley Ski Holdings, LLC. Squaw Valley Ski Holdings seeks to connect the two resorts with a “Base-to-Base” gondola. It has been discussed in the media that the new company will seek to eventually combine the two resorts into one mega-resort through an agreement with a local property owner, Troy Caldwell, who owns the land connecting Alpine Meadows and Squaw Valley - White Wolf Mountain. If connected via White Wolf, the combined ski area would be the second-largest resort in North America, behind Whistler Blackcomb. Alpine Meadows and Squaw Valley offer visitors 6,000 skiable acres, eight peaks, 44 lifts, and over 270 trails. Resort owners need permission from local land managers, including both Placer County and the Tahoe National Forest which are currently studying the proposed project's environmental impacts. A number of conservation organizations, including Sierra Watch and the Sierra Club, consider the proposed gondola a threat to Granite Chief Wilderness.
