= White Wolf Mountain =

Ski area in California, USA

White Wolf Mountain is a 460-acre (190 ha) private ski area located in the Lake Tahoe area of California. The property is named after a large white dog rescued from a cliff on the property.

== Location ==
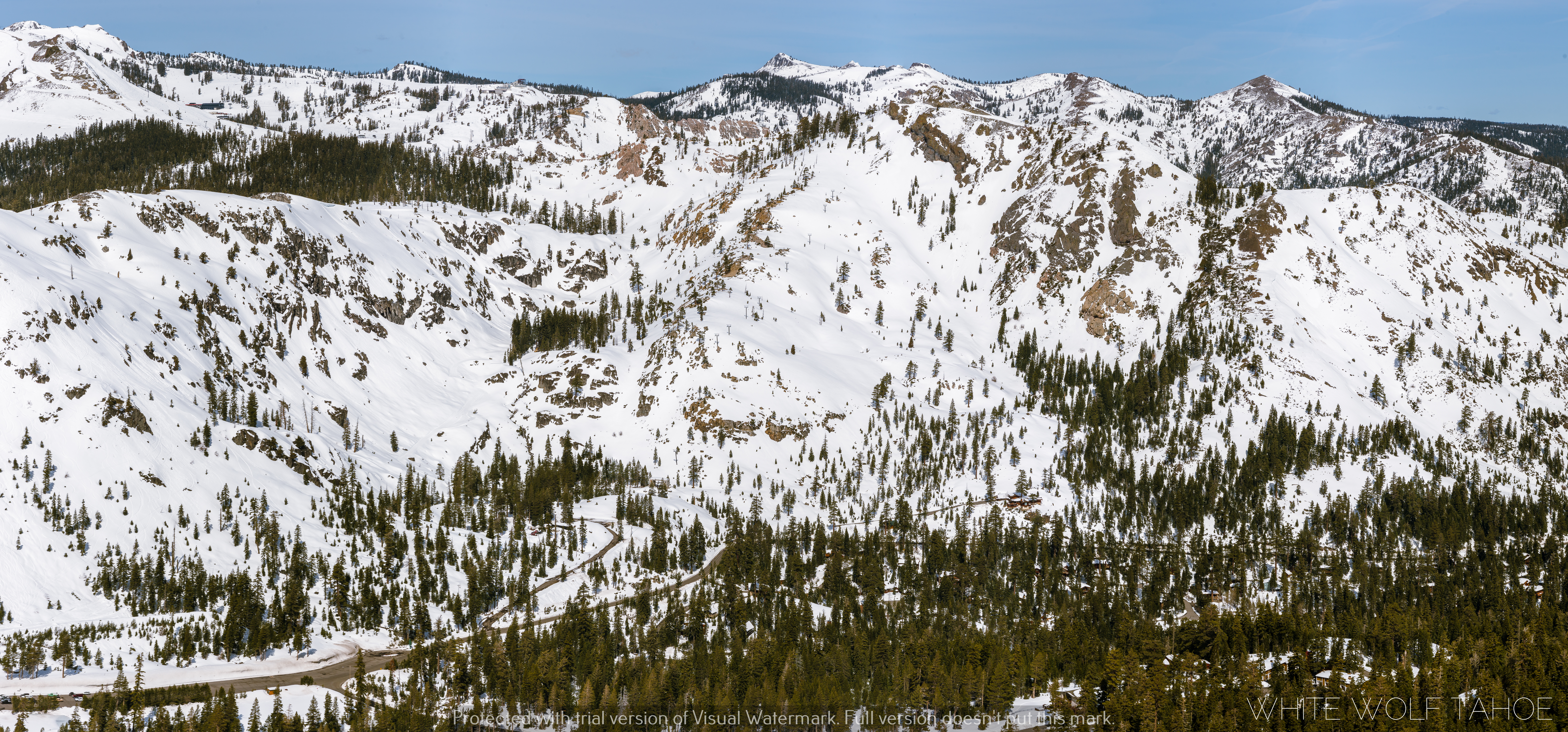
White Wolf Tahoe - full mountain (2017).

White Wolf Mountain is located between Olympic Valley, Placer County, California and Alpine Meadows, California.

The property runs from the parking lot at Alpine Meadows to Palisades Tahoe and includes KT-22, which Palisades Tahoe leases from White Wolf Mountain.

== Current Use ==
Currently the land is used as a private ski area with 1123 vertical feet, and ski areas are accessed via Snowcat. A chairlift is also currently being installed, and its installation is the subject of litigation with Palisades Tahoe Ski Resort.

== History ==
In 1970, Troy Caldwell started working selling lift tickets at Alpine Meadows. He was an avid freestyle skier and later joined the US Freestyle team. He met his wife Susan who also worked at Alpine Meadows. Caldwell had studied architecture in college and also built houses in the summer months, building one to live in and another as a rental unit.

Caldwell and his wife dreamed of opening a mountain ski lodge, and the land that he was interested in he found out was owned by Southern Pacific Railroad. Caldwell visited Brandon Mark of Southern Pacific, who told him that SP was in the process of spinning of its land portfolio to Catellus Development Corporation, and was keen to sell the land for cash if possible. During the land negotiation, SP called Squaw Valley to ask if they were still interested to buy the land, and the Squaw Valley employee said to SP (by mistake) that they were not interested in buying it (despite Alexander Cushing's many attempts to buy it over the years). He initially planned to ask Southern Pacific to sell him 5 acres (2.0 ha), but the railroad refused and offered the entire 460-acre (190 ha) parcel. Troy Caldwell purchased the 460-acre (190 ha) section of property in 1989 from Southern Pacific Railroad for US$450,000 (equivalent to $1,141,490 in 2024).

According to Troy Caldwell:

"The section of land that I own borders Alpine Meadows and butts right up to their parking lot...and rolls over onto KT-22. It is my mountain. I own about 70 acres (28 ha) of Squaw. I bought it from Southern Pacific Land Co. in 1989."

The land purchase angered Alexander Cushing, the then-owner of Palisades:

“It was extraordinary that Southern Pacific sold the land directly out from under us, it doesn’t make any sense.”

After buying the land the Caldwells built a road in to the land and lived on it. Cushing of Squaw Valley was unhappy that Caldwell had bought the land and eventually sued Caldwell in 1996 for breach of contract (as Caldwell was now leaseholder of land leased to Squaw Valley). Caldwell and Cushing later agreed to trade 70 acres (28 ha) of land for ski lift equipment, and Caldwell later filed suit against Cushing for breach of contract, as Caldwell argued that Cushing had failed to deliver the ski lift towers as promised.

Caldwell after beginning construction of his first chairlift was sued by the Bear Creek Homeowners Association. Caldwell eventually settled the suit and stopped construction of his ski lifts in 2007, and agreed that the land would only be utilized as a private ski area with up to 25 guests on the mountain at any given time.

As of 2014, Andy Wirth of KSL Capital Partners and Troy Caldwell have been working on using the land to interconnect Palisades Tahoe and Alpine Meadows.

Caldwell stated in 2019 he has spent $1.4 million "on paperwork" and lives a modest life driving a 1987 Toyota pickup. In 2019 Caldwell received a response from Placer County regarding his plans to build 38 single-family homes, 14 guest units, housing for employees, a lodge, and only two ski lifts.

As of 2019, Alterra Mountain Company (the owner of Squaw and Alpine) continued to desire to cross the property with a base-to-base gondola to connect Squaw and Alpine.

In 2022, Palisades and Alpine Meadows opened the base-to-base gondola, with about half of the towers on White Wolf Mountain land.

== Early development plans ==
It is the stated goal of Troy Caldwell to use the land to interconnect Palisades Tahoe and Alpine Meadows ski areas. There is also significant community interest in connecting the two resorts.

In September 2011, Alpine Meadows and Squaw Valley Ski Resort merged ownership. The two resorts will retain their distinct identities but unite under common management dominated by Squaw's Valley's parent company, KSL Capital Partners. Alpine Meadow's parent, JMA Ventures, will own a smaller part. The new umbrella entity over both resorts will be known as Squaw Valley Ski Holdings LLC. It has been discussed in the media that the new company Squaw Valley Ski Holdings LLC, will seek to eventually combine the two resorts into one large resort through an agreement with a ski resort located on the mountain connecting Alpine Meadows and Squaw Valley, called White Wolf Mountain. This proposed combination was supported by White Wolf Mountain owner Troy Caldwell. If connected via White Wolf, the combined ski area would be the second largest resort in North America, only slightly smaller than Whistler Blackcomb.

Caldwell's 2011 proposed vision for White Wolf Mountain includes:

- A small high-end ski resort
- Gondola & 3 ski lifts
- Mid mountain hotel
- Small village complete with ice skating rink

In 2015, Squaw Valley Ski Holdings LLC announced a proposal to build a gondola through the property to connect the resorts.

== Litigation ==
Troy Caldwell is currently in litigation with Palisades Tahoe over his installation of chairlift towers that would interconnect the two resorts. There have been many rounds of litigation, with the California Supreme Court ruling in 2000 that Caldwell was allowed to open his proposed chairlift, subject to limitations.

Some indication exists that Palisades Tahoe's new ownership, KSL Partners, is seeking to work with Caldwell, and put aside their differences. In December 2011, KSL paid for Caldwell to study ski resort development in the American West. He visited Jackson, Vail, Aspen, Snowmass, Buttermilk, Aspen Highlands, Beaver Creek, Steamboat, Grand Targhee, & Big Sky. KSL footed the bill for that on-site research and Caldwell said of the trip, “(KSL) treated us like kings and queens.”

== White Wolf Subdivision ==
In 2019, White Wolf Subdivision was proposed to Placer County planning department, and proposed 38 single family homes, 2 ski lifts and other amenities. The current concept is a private ski area with its own lifts, lodges, etc.
