= Snow Summit =

Ski area in California, United States

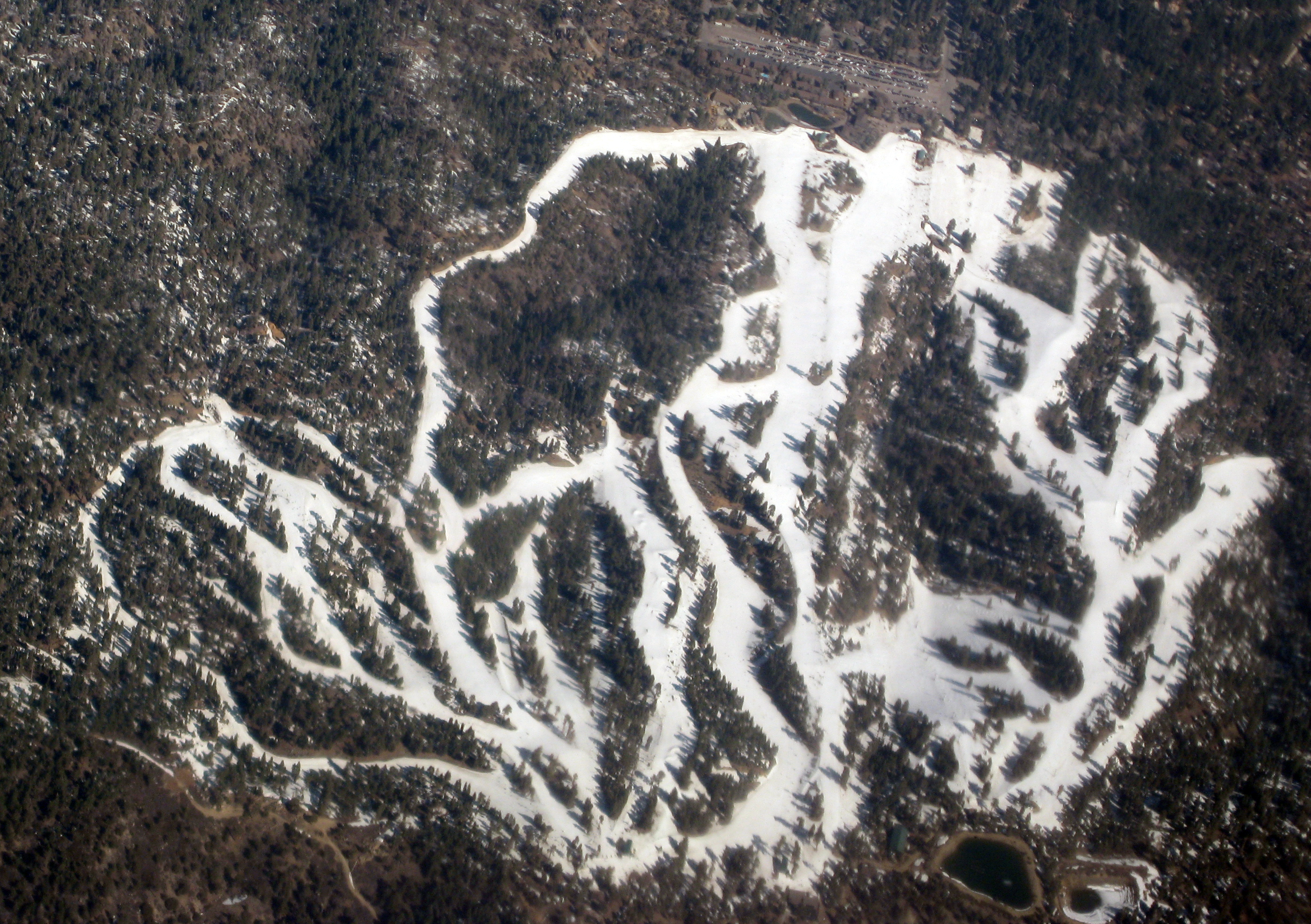
- A Satellite View of Snow Summit Ski Resort, March 2008

- Location in California Snow Summit (the United States)
- Location: Snow Summit
- Nearest city: Big Bear Lake, California
- Coordinates: 34.2286°N 116.8911°W
- Status: Operating
- Owner: Alterra Mountain Company
- Vertical: 1,209 ft (369 m)
- Top elevation: 8,174 ft (2,491 m)
- Base elevation: 6,965 ft (2,123 m)
- Skiable area: 240 acres (97 ha)
- Trails: 31 total 10% beginner 25% low intermediate 40% intermediate 25% advanced
- Longest run: 1.25 mi (2.01 km) (Westridge)
- Lift system: 14 lifts
- Lift capacity: 18,550 passengers/hr
- Snowfall: 100 in (250 cm)
- Snowmaking: Yes, 100% of developed terrain, 240 Acres
- Night skiing: Yes
- Website: www.snowsummit.com

Snow Summit is a ski resort that was established in 1952 and is in the San Bernardino Mountains in Southern California. It is located by Big Bear Lake along with its sister resort Bear Mountain; these two resorts which operate under the same management are collectively known as Big Bear Mountain Resorts (BBMR), alongside the new addition of Running Springs’ Snow Valley.

Snow Summit is one of the larger ski areas in Southern California, and is considered to be one of the most popular ski and snowboard destinations for patrons from around the Los Angeles area. Snow Summit is a mid-sized resort, with a 1,209 ft (369 m) topographic vertical drop, and 240 acres (97 ha) of skiable terrain, partially covered by snowmaking.

In 2014, Mammoth Mountain Ski Area (owned by Starwood Capital Group at that time under the entity Mammoth Resorts) purchased Bear Mountain and Snow Summit for $38 million. In 2017, Mammoth Resorts, which also included June Mountain, announced its sale by Starwood to a partnership of Aspen Skiing Company and KSL Capital Partners, known as Alterra Mountain Company.

== Big Bear Mountain Resort ==
For decades, Snow Summit and Goldmine Mountain operated independently of one another, less than two miles apart. In 1988, S.K.I., a major ski area operator, bought Goldmine, changed its name to Bear Mountain, and invested millions of dollars in improvements that enhanced its competitive position against Snow Summit. In 2002, Snow Summit purchased Bear Mountain, and the two became one company.

In January 2023, Big Bear Mountain Resort purchased Snow Valley.

Snow Summit, Snow Valley, and Bear Mountain are marketed as areas constituent to Big Bear Mountain Resorts. A lift ticket from either area is honored at the others, and a free bus service between Snow Summit and Bear Mountain shuttles patrons back and forth between the two for that purpose.

Since 2023, there have been rumors of a connection between Snow Summit and Bear Mountain. A plan has been submitted to the U.S. Forest Service, but approval won’t be announced until Spring 2025 according to insider reports.

== Snowmaking ==
Snow Summit's multimillion-dollar snowmaking system draws water from Big Bear Lake to cover all of the resort's marked terrain with skiable artificial snow — if ambient temperature and humidity are amenable — throughout its winter operating season .

== Snow Summit trails ==
Beginner	Intermediate	Difficult	Expert
Skyline Creek	Miracle Mile	Ego Trip Park	The Wall
Sundown	Pipe Dream	Dicky's	Olympic
Summit Run	Westridge Freestyle Park	Tommi's	Side Chute
Cruiser	East Why	Off Chute
Last Chance	Zzyzx Park	Log Chute
	Miracle Mile
	Timber Ridge
	Log Chute
	Mainstream
	7-Down
	Perfect Pitches
	Side Show
	Sugar Pine
	Jo's
