= Palisades Tahoe =

Ski resort in Lake Tahoe, California

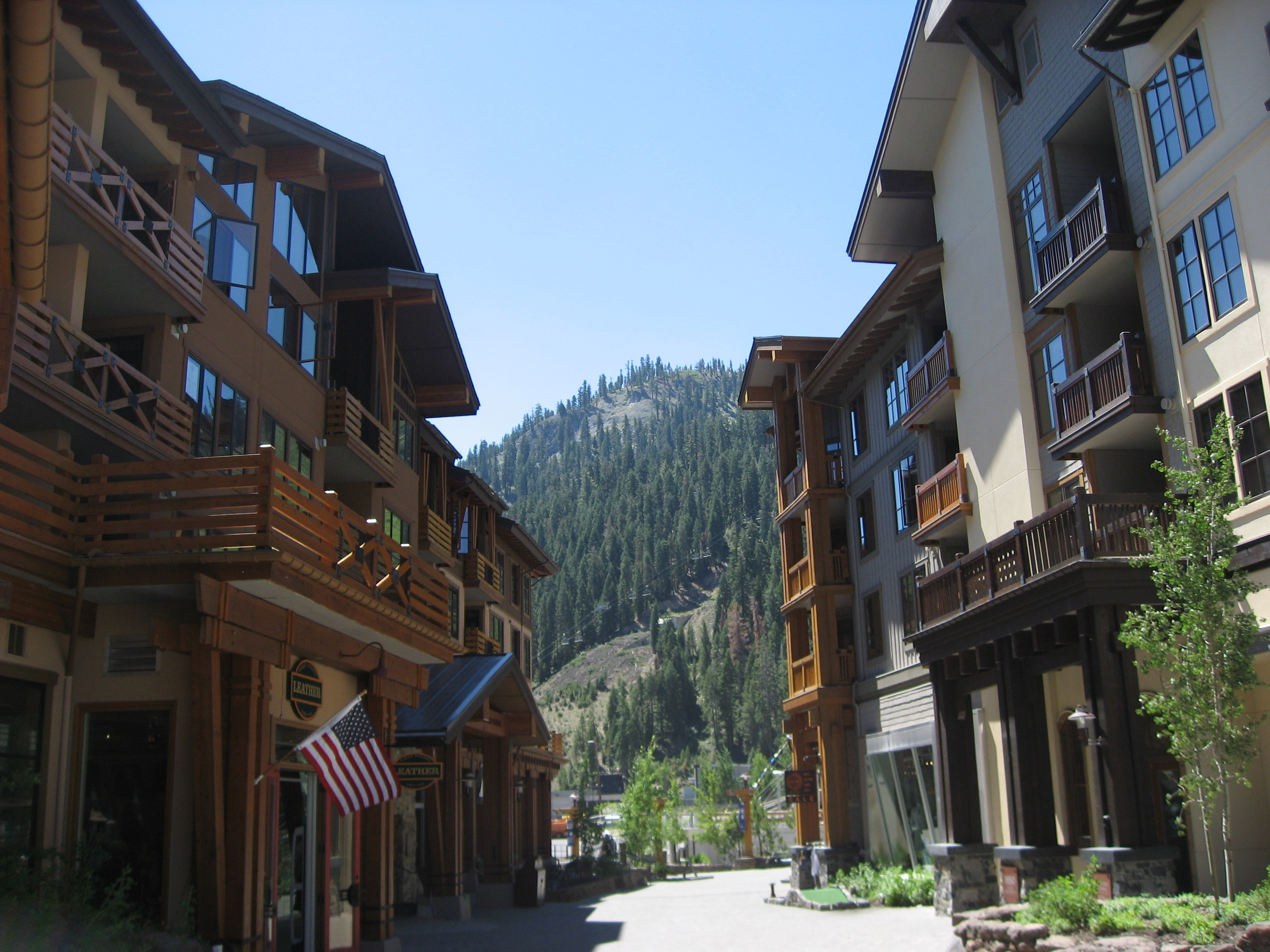
- The Village at Palisades Tahoe in July 2007

- Location in the United States Location in California
- Location: 1960 Olympic Valley Road; Olympic Valley, California
- Nearest city: Truckee, California; Reno, Nevada
- Coordinates: 39.196°N 120.235°W
- Status: Operating
- Owner: Alterra Mountain Company
- Vertical: 2,850 feet (869 m)
- Top elevation: 9,050 feet (2,758 m)
- Base elevation: 6,200 feet (1,890 m)
- Skiable area: 3,600 acres (14.6 km^{2})
- Trails: 177+
- Longest run: 3.2 miles (5.1 km); Mountain Run
- Lift system: 30
- Lift capacity: 58,000 per hour
- Terrain parks: Yes, 2
- Snowfall: 400 inches (33.3 ft; 10.2 m)
- Snowmaking: Yes
- Night skiing: No
- Website: www.palisadestahoe.com

Palisades Tahoe is a ski resort in the Western United States, located in Olympic Valley, California, northwest of Tahoe City in the Sierra Nevada range. Founded 77 years ago in 1949 as Squaw Valley, it changed its name in 2021 due to the derogatory connotations of the word "squaw". It was the host site for the 1960 Winter Olympics.

The resort is the largest skiing complex in the Lake Tahoe region, and is known for its challenging terrain. Palisades Tahoe (not including Alpine Meadows) has a base elevation of 6,200 feet (1,890 m) and a skiable 3,600 acres (5.6 sq mi; 14.6 km^{2}) across six peaks, employing 23 chairlifts, 4 carpet lifts, a tramway, a gondola connecting it to Alpine Meadows, and the only funitel in the United States. It tops out at 9,010 feet (2,746 m) at Granite Chief, and averages 400 inches (33.3 ft; 10.2 m) of annual snowfall. The resort attracts approximately 600,000 skiers a year, and is also home to several annual summer events.

The spotlight of the 1960 Olympics raised the resort's profile, and it went through several ownership changes beginning in the 1970s. In 2012, it merged with nearby Alpine Meadows, and became Squaw Valley Alpine Meadows, to offer joint access to 6,000 acres (9.4 sq mi; 24.3 km^{2}), 43 lifts, and over 270 runs. However, a constructed gondola connection between the resorts, as well as a proposed development at its base, has met with controversy from environmentalists.

== History ==
=== Construction ===
Former University of Nevada ski racer Wayne Poulsen, purchased the first 2,000 acres (3.1 sq mi; 8.1 km^{2}) of what later became Squaw Valley Ski Resort from the Southern Pacific Railroad. New York lawyer Alexander Cushing went into partnership with Poulsen to develop the resort. After a disagreement over the resort's future, Cushing gained control of the project and became the chairman of Squaw Valley Ski Corporation. The resort opened in 1949, and Cushing remained its chairman until his death.

=== 1960 Winter Olympics ===
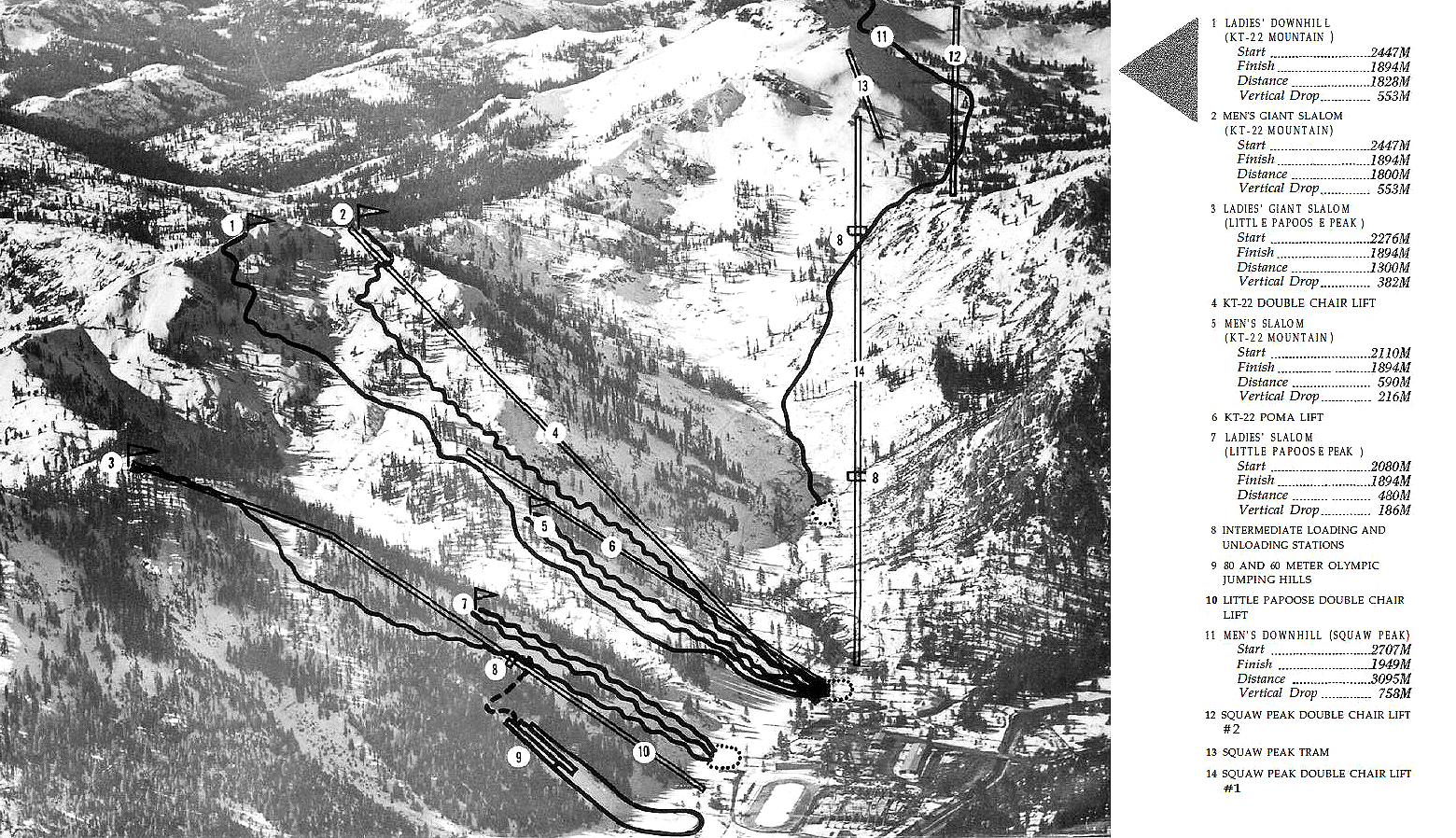
Alpine runs of the 1960 Winter Olympics

Palisades Tahoe's success can be largely attributed to the visibility that came from hosting the Winter Olympics in 1960, a direct result of Cushing's effort and determination. During the planning stages for those Olympics, Innsbruck, Austria, was the leading choice, but Cushing secured the bid in 1955 after winning over the International Olympic Committee (IOC) in Paris with a scale model of his planned Olympic site. (Innsbruck hosted the next Winter Olympics in 1964 and again in 1976.)

During the Olympics, Palisades Tahoe was designated as California Historical Landmark Number 724. A marker was placed identifying Palisades Tahoe as a Pioneer Ski Area of America. The marker's plaque commemorated a century of organized skiing in "mining towns in the Sierra Nevada, particularly Whiskey Diggs, Poker Flat, Port Wine, Onion Valley, La Porte, and Johnsville".

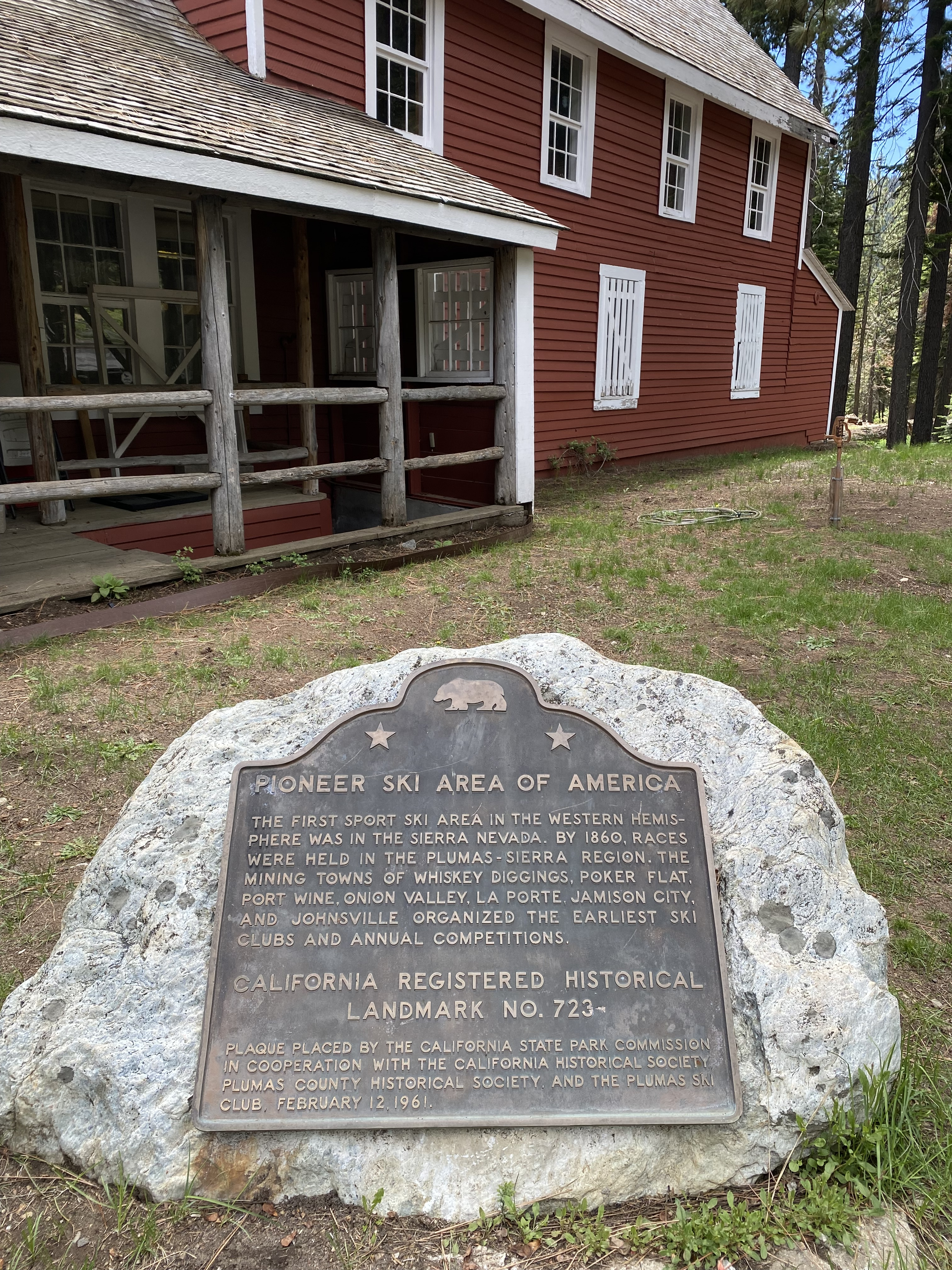
Historic marker

Palisades Tahoe hosted World Cup races in 1969 with four technical events: slalom and giant slalom for both men and women. World Cup racing returned with women's technical events in March 2017 and men's in February 2023.

=== Ownership changes ===
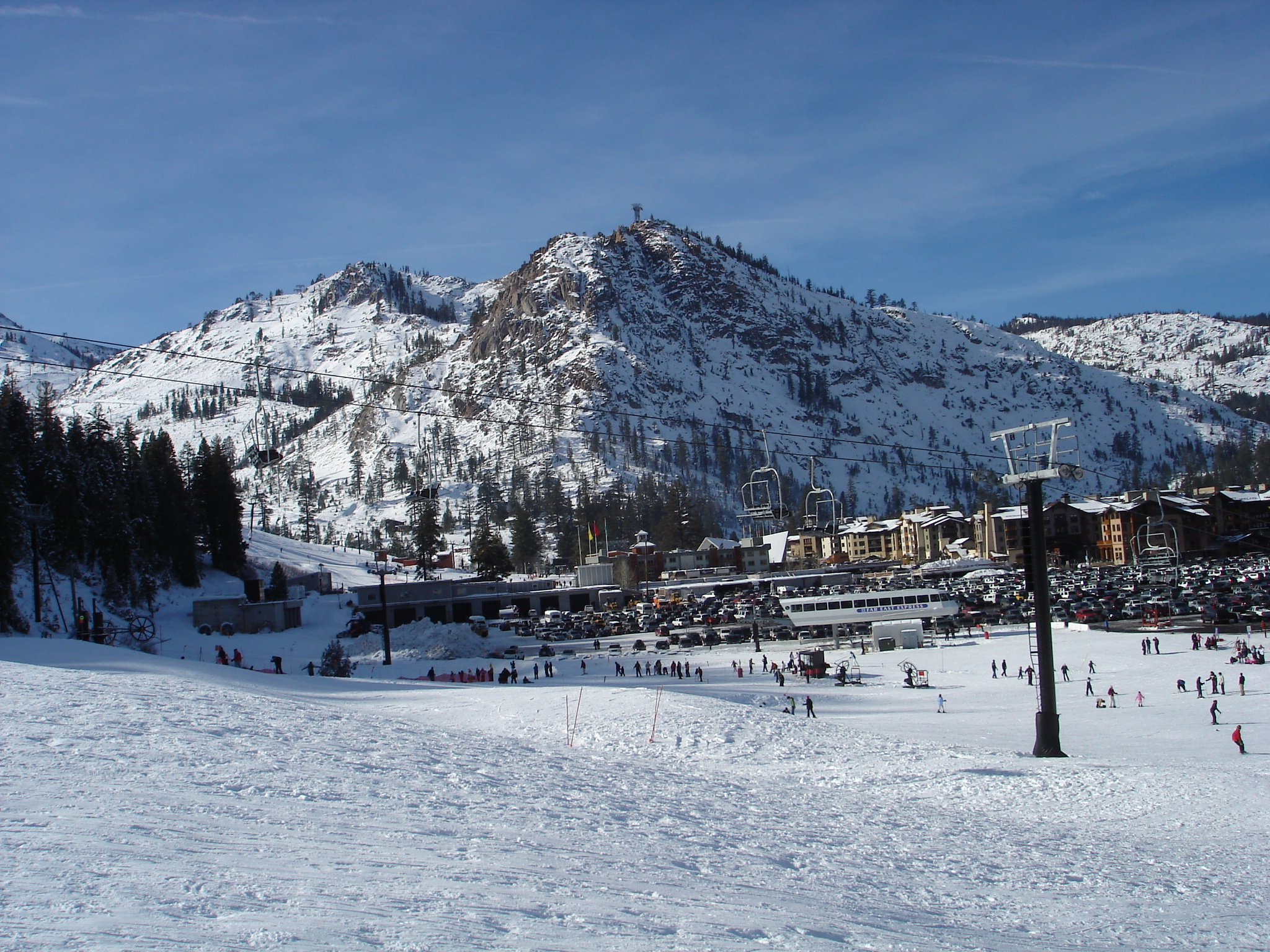
Base area in December 2006

In 1971, following several years of financial losses, the state announced it would seek bids to buy Squaw Valley. After a bid by John Fell Stevenson failed, Dick Baker and his Australian company Mainline Corporation successfully bid $25 million plus 1,500 acres from the Poulsens. In August 1974 the Australian company Mainline Corporation collapsed and Squaw Valley was again back on the market for sale.

In 1978, Squaw Valley experienced one of the worst cable car accidents in history. On a stormy afternoon late in the season on Saturday, 15 April, the tram came off of one of its cables, dropped 75 feet (23 m) and then bounced back up, colliding with a cable which sheared through the car; four were killed and 31 injured.

Squaw Valley was purchased by private equity group KSL Capital Partners in November 2010. In September 2011, Alpine Meadows Ski Resort and Squaw Valley Ski Resort announced their intention to merge ownership. The merger united the two popular ski destinations under common management by Squaw's Valley's parent company, KSL Capital Partners, LLC. A year later, Squaw Valley and Alpine Meadows Ski Resort merged under the new umbrella leadership of Squaw Valley Ski Holdings, LLC. The new company started to operate as one, under the combined name Squaw Valley Alpine Meadows, with joint lift tickets, single season passes for visitors, and free shuttles between its locations, but preserves the individuality of the two resorts. In 2017, KSL Capital, in partnership with Aspen/Snowmass (Henry Crown and Company), formed Alterra Mountain Company, which then became the primary owner of Squaw Valley.

=== Alpine Meadows gondola connection ===
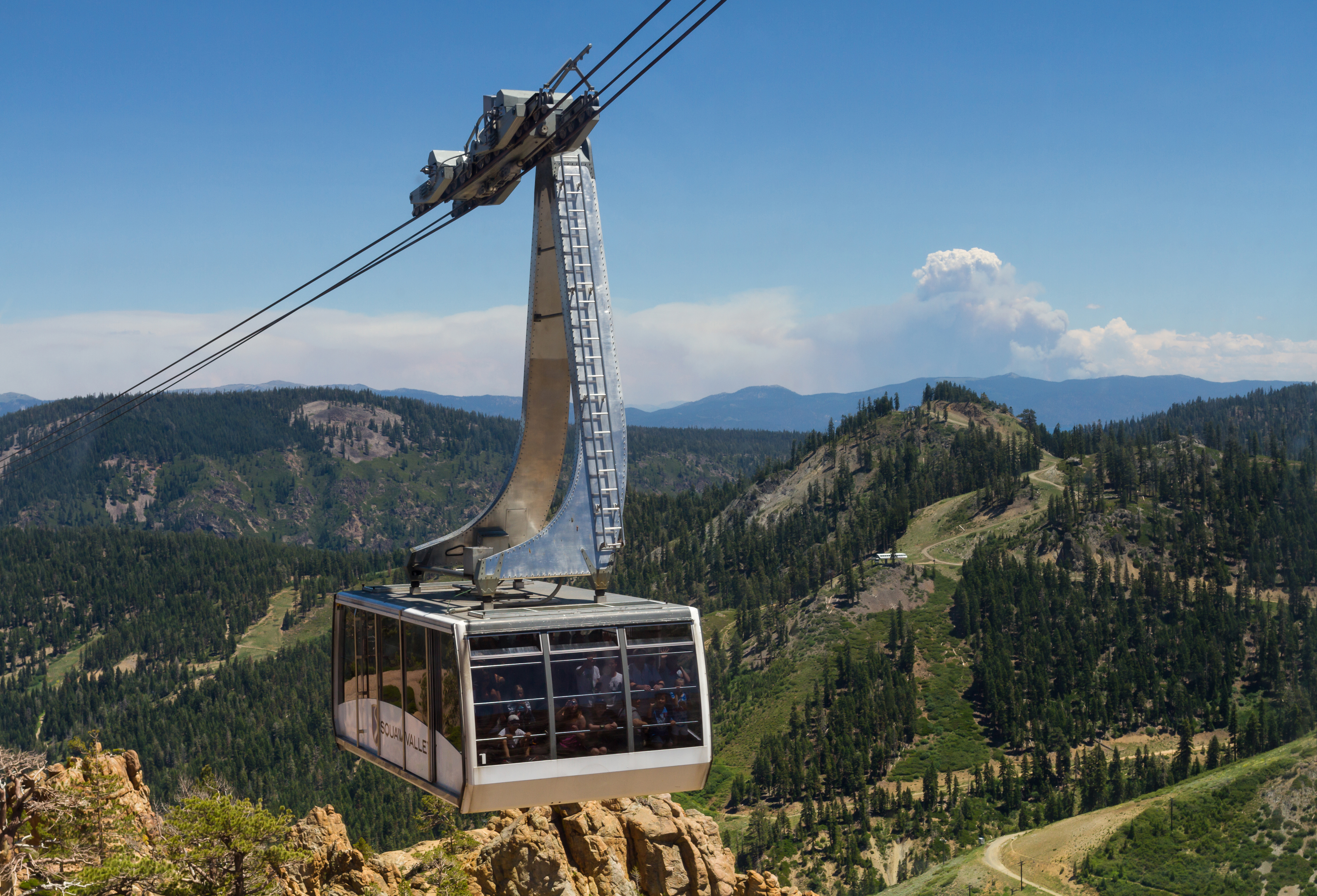
Aerial tram to High Camp

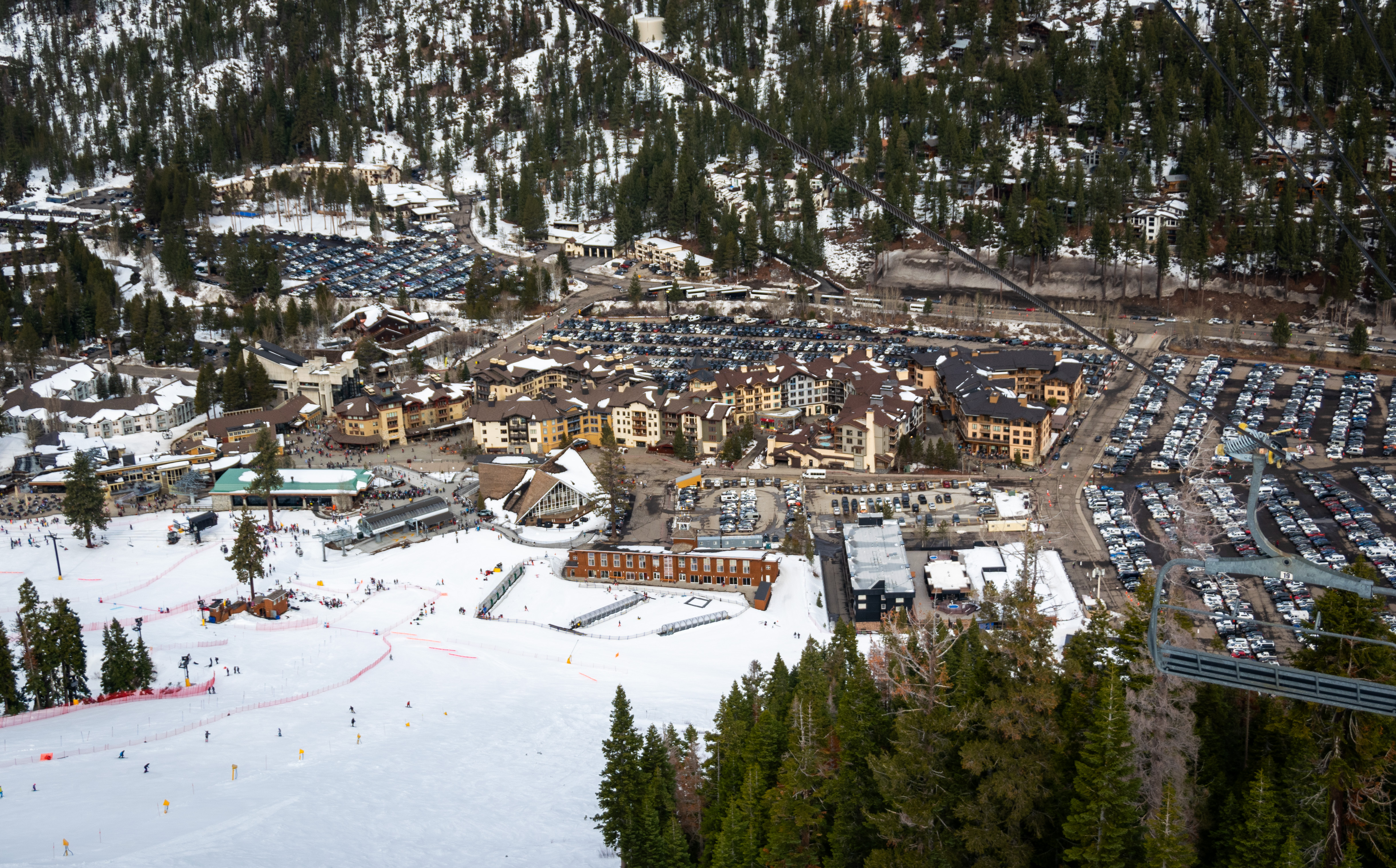
An elevated view of the village and some of the lifts

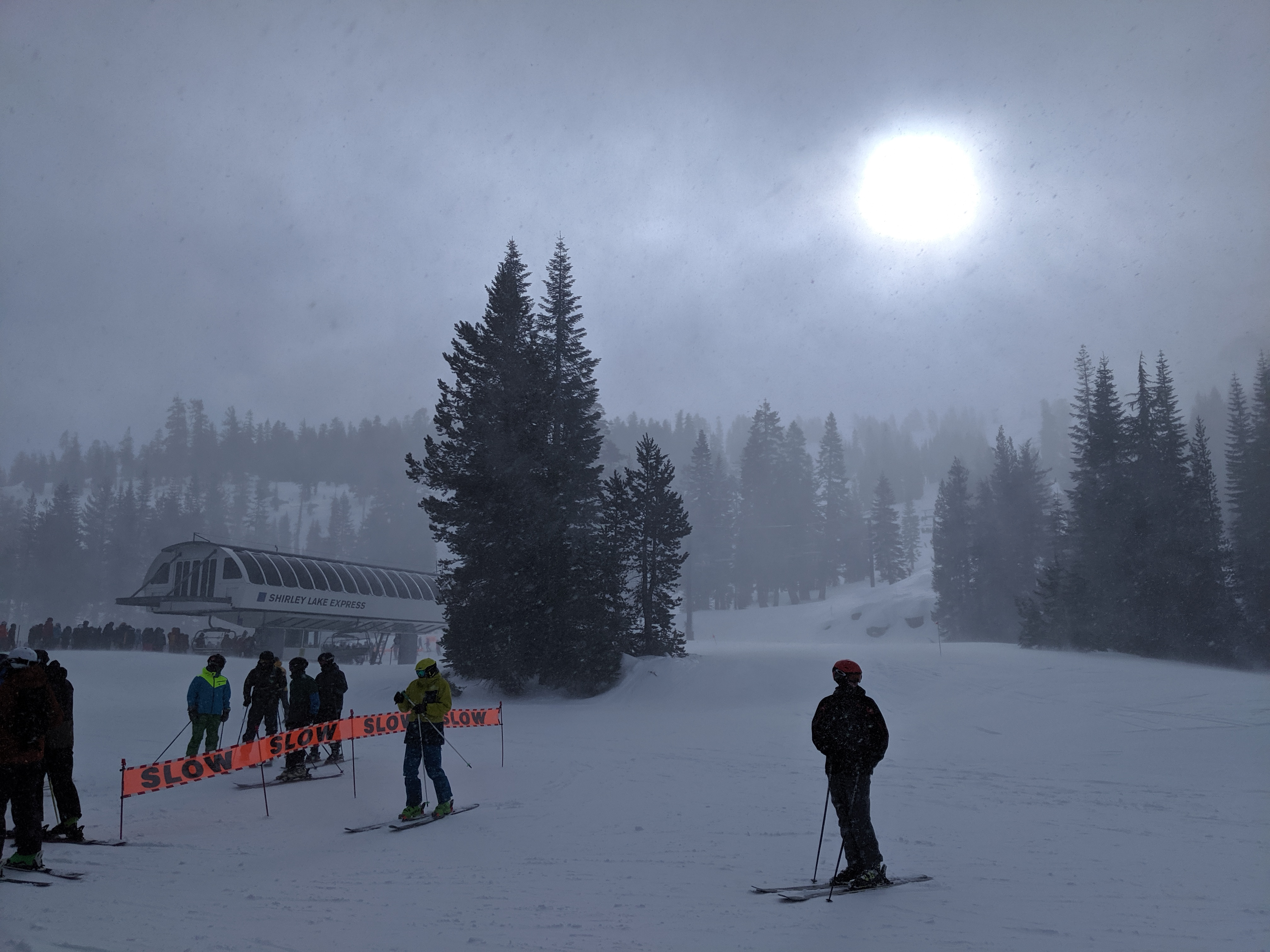
The backside, at the base of Shirley Lake Express in January 2020

Squaw Valley Ski Holdings, LLC sought to connect to the Alpine Meadows resort with a "Base-to-Base" gondola.

A number of conservation organizations, including Sierra Watch and the Sierra Club, considered the proposed gondola a threat to Granite Chief Wilderness. In July 2019 Sierra Watch and Granite Chief Wilderness Protection League filed a lawsuit against Squaw Valley challenging Placer County's approval of the gondola project. In January 2020 the United States Forest Service issued its Record of Decision approving a route crossing federal lands. In February 2020, the litigants dropped the suit in exchange for Squaw Valley's commitment to implement measures to mitigate the impact towards the Sierra Nevada yellow-legged frog.

The approved gondola was planned to cross the private ski area White Wolf Mountain, which is owned by Troy Caldwell, who supported the gondola's construction. Construction of the gondola commenced in Summer 2021, and in 2022 the base-to-base gondola finally opened, connecting the Palisades Tahoe resort with Alpine Meadows, while crossing through neighboring resort White Wolf Mountain.

=== Development proposals ===
Separate from the approved Squaw Alpine proposed gondola, Squaw Alpine has also proposed a large development in the existing Squaw Valley parking lot area. In 2016, Squaw Valley Ski Holdings submitted a final application for entitlements for its proposed Village at Squaw Valley Specific Plan, a $1-billion plan that prompted the Attorney General of California to write a letter of concern to Placer County. The plan would include 850 hotel and condominium units and a 96-foot-tall "Mountain Adventure Camp" featuring a year-round indoor waterpark. According to the environmental review for the project, new development is projected to add 3,300 new car trips to local roads on peak days, and the project would have twenty "significant but unavoidable" impacts".

Sierra Watch created a grassroots campaign to "Keep Squaw True", holding public events and circulating an online petition in opposition to KSL Capital Partners' proposed expansion plan.

In November 2016, the Placer County Board of Supervisors approved KSL's controversial development proposal in spite of opposition from local conservation organizations, including Sierra Watch. Sierra Watch filed suit to overturn those approvals for violating the California Environmental Quality Act in December 2016.

In 2017, resort owners added a roller coaster to their development proposal.

=== Squaw Valley renaming ===
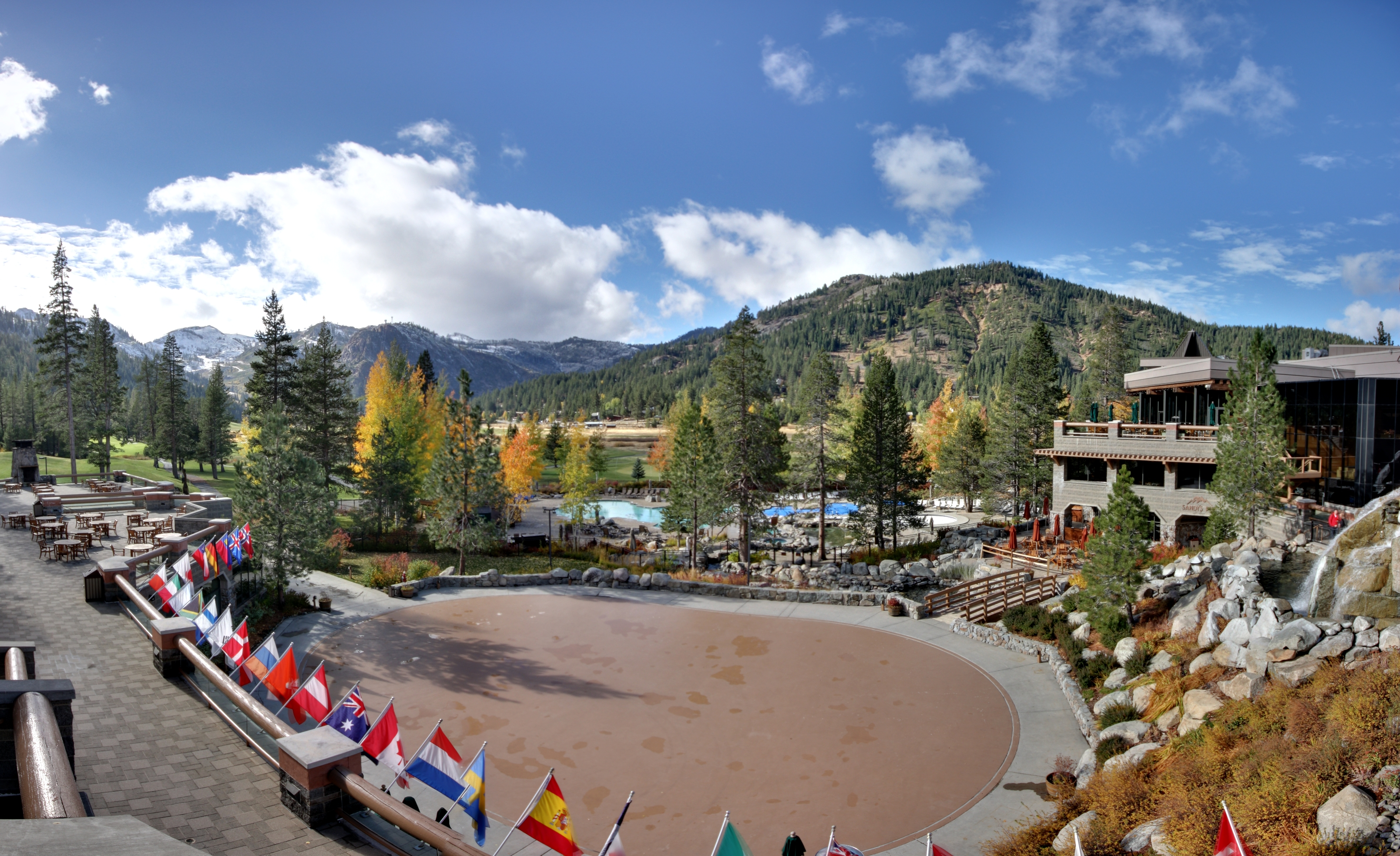
View of the resort in 2010.

The term "squaw" is an offensive ethnic and sexual slur historically used for Indigenous North American women and the Washoe tribe, which is native to the region, criticized its use as the name of the resort. In August 2020, the resort announced it planned to change its name. Resort President Ron Cohen said in a statement, "While we love our local history and the memories we all associate with this place as it has been named for so long, we are confronted with the overwhelming evidence that the term 'squaw' is considered offensive."

The new name, Palisades Tahoe, was formally announced in September 2021. The Washoe tribe stated it "commends and fully supports the resort management and others who contributed to this milestone decision." After coming to an agreement regarding the name change, the ski resort and the Washoe tribe have been working together in educating resort guests about tribal culture, with the resort launching a Washoe cultural tour and an exhibit on the Washoe way of life. The main road leading to the resort was subsequently renamed by the county from "Squaw Valley Road" to "Olympic Valley Road" in early 2022.

== Terrain aspect ==
- North: 50%
- East: 40%
- West: 2%
- South: 8%

== Snowfall ==
Annual snowfall at Palisades Tahoe can surpass 500 inches (41.7 ft; 12.7 m).

View chart definition.
