= Snow Valley Mountain Resort =

Skiing resort in California, United States

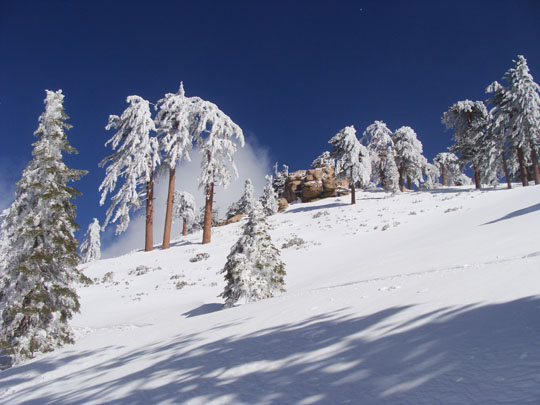
- Interactive map of Snow Valley Mountain Resort
- Location: Running Springs; San Bernardino County, California
- Nearest city: Running Springs, California
- Coordinates: 34.223375°N 117.037423°W
- Status: Operating
- Owner: Alterra Mountain Company
- Vertical: 1,041 ft (317 m)
- Top elevation: 7,841 ft (2,390 m)
- Base elevation: 6,800 ft (2,100 m)
- Skiable area: 240 acres (97 ha)
- Trails: 29 total 14% easiest 45% More difficult 31% Most difficult 10% Experts only
- Lift system: 12 lifts: 1 High Speed Six, 4 Double, 4 Triple, 2 conveyor
- Lift capacity: Six Person Detachable - 2,600 riders per hour
- Terrain parks: The Edge, East Bowl
- Snowfall: 150 inches (380 cm)
- Snowmaking: Yes
- Night skiing: Yes
- Website: bbmr.com

== History ==
Snow Valley Mountain Resort is a ski resort located in Running Springs, California, United States. Snow Valley is the longest continually operating ski resort in Southern California and is also one of three ski resorts in the San Bernardino National Forest.

Originally named "Fish Camp" for the pond located in the area above the former chair 5, the site was developed into a roadside resort and lumber mill in the 1920s by the Swetkowich brothers. In the 1930s the slopes were developed for tobogganing and skiing by the Arrowhead Springs Corporation, which named the development Snow Valley. The resort featured one of the first overhead cable ski lifts. In 1940 the resort was purchased by Norwegian-American ski jump champion Johnny Elvrum, who expanded it.

In 1974 W.R. Sauey became the owner of Snow Valley. His company the Nordic Group owned and operated Snow Valley. In January 2023, Snow Valley was acquired by Alterra Mountain Company, operator of nearby resorts Bear Mountain and Snow Summit.

The resort operates under Special Use Permit from the United States Forest Service.

== Lifts ==
The facilities include 12 Lifts: 1 high speed six, 4 double chairs, 4 triple chairs, 3 surface lifts/moving carpets.

At the fleet's peak, 14 lifts were operating at once, 3 of those lifts have since closed, with chair 2 getting remodeled for the 23-24 ski season, shortening it to serve only the beginner area at the resort.

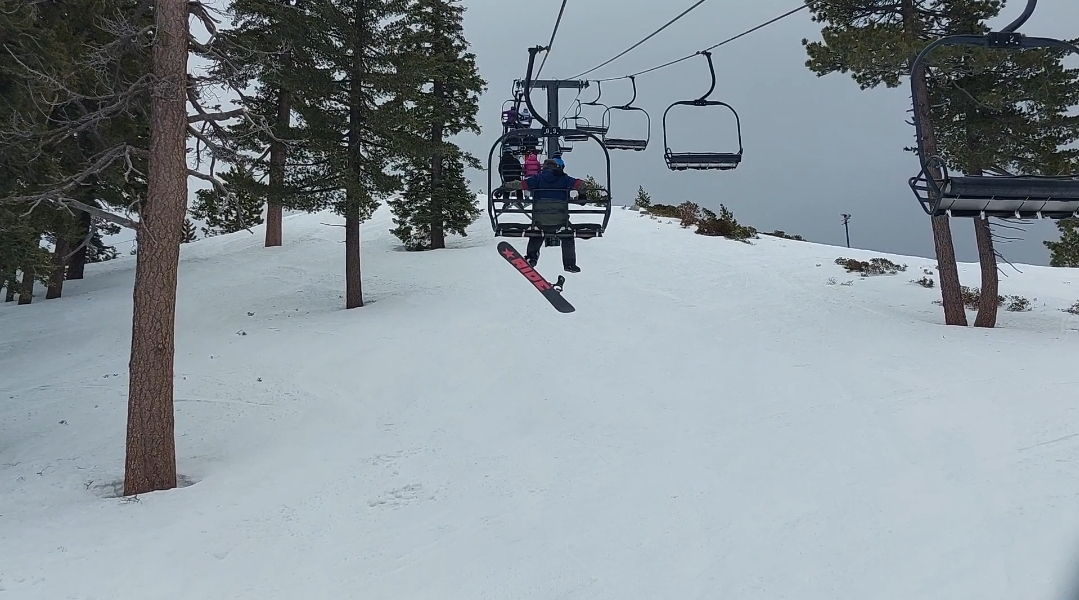
Chair 11, at Snow Valley, serves the Slide Peak terrain zone

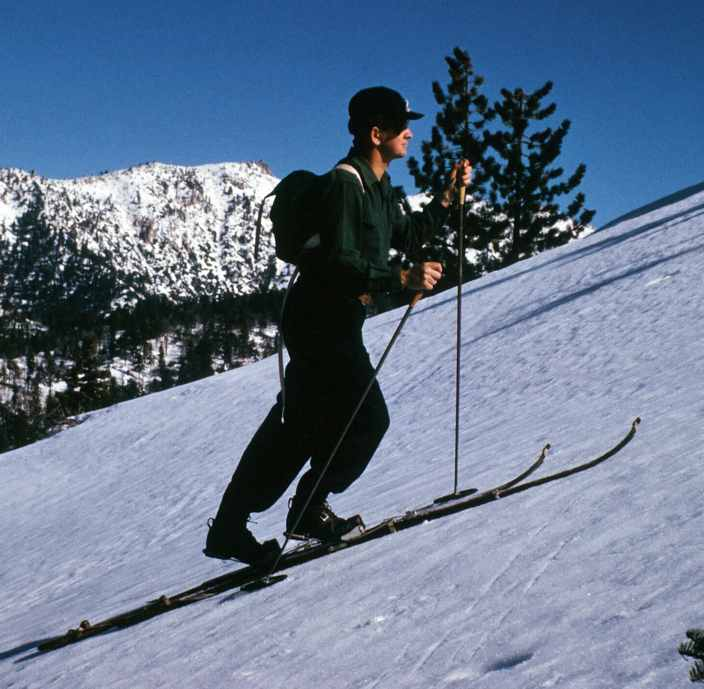
Skier en route to Slide Peak in 1943, following the current chairlift route
