= Alpine Meadows, California =

Unincorporated community in California, United States

Alpine Meadows
- Unincorporated community
- Location in California
- Coordinates: 39°10′43″N 120°13′40″W
- Country: United States
- State: California
- County: Placer County
- Elevation: 6,480 ft (1,975 m)

Alpine Meadows is an unincorporated community in Placer County, California. The community is located on Bear Creek, a tributary of the Truckee River 5 miles (8.0 km) west of Tahoe City, at an elevation of 6,480 ft (1,980 m).

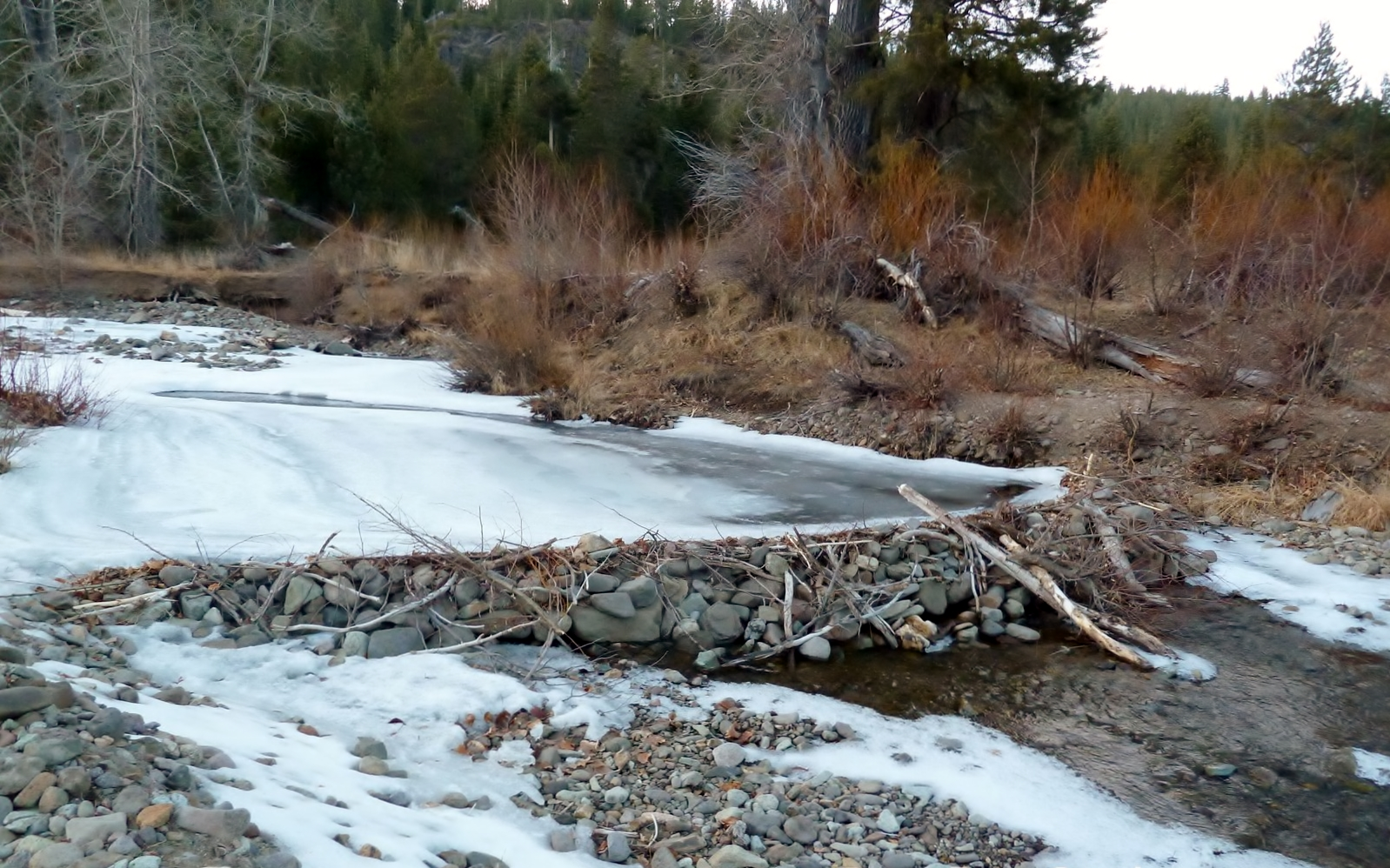
Rock Beaver Dam on Bear Creek, Jan. 2011 (Alpine Meadows, California)

== Community ==
Alpine Meadows encompasses approximately five square miles and serves a permanent population of approximately 500 residents. This includes four commercial centers, a 30-unit apartment complex, 462 single-family homes, and 130 condominiums.

== Public services ==
Alpine Meadows is served by the Alpine Springs County Water District since 1962. Fire services are contracted to the North Tahoe Fire Protection District. The community is governed by Homeowner association rules set by the HOA's in the area, including: Bear Creek HOA, Alpine Meadows Condos, Alpine Manor, and Alpine Place. Due to the fire danger in the area, the Bear Creek Association created a set of mandatory Defensible space (fire control) requirements for all homeowners and vacant land owners inside the Bear Creek HOA to follow. Garbage services are contracted to Tahoe Truckee Sierra Disposal Inc. Electricity is provided by Liberty Energy.

== Ski resort ==
The Alpine Meadows ski resort is in the North Lake Tahoe California area, near Olympic Valley. The resort has 11 chairlifts and two surface lifts covering 2,400 acres (970 ha) of terrain. Alpine has a vertical drop of 1,800 ft (550 m) with a top elevation of 8,637 ft (2,633 m). Minimal accommodations are available at the resort itself, so most people opt for a hotel at Tahoe City, Olympic Valley, Donner Pass, or Truckee.

== Film location ==
Alpine Meadows played the part of the fictional "Alpine College" in the 1966 Universal Pictures comedy film, Wild Wild Winter, with all of the exterior sequences being shot on location.

== Climate ==
The Köppen Climate System classifies Long Barn as having a Hot-summer Mediterranean climate, abbreviated as "Csb".

Climate data for Alpine Meadows, California
Month	Jan	Feb	Mar	Apr	May	Jun	Jul	Aug	Sep	Oct	Nov	Dec	Year
Record high °F (°C)	58 (14)	60 (16)	69 (21)	75 (24)	85 (29)	91 (33)	97 (36)	95 (35)	91 (33)	84 (29)	76 (24)	63 (17)	97 (36)
Mean daily maximum °F (°C)	39.0 (3.9)	42.0 (5.6)	44.4 (6.9)	49.1 (9.5)	63.5 (17.5)	73.7 (23.2)	80.9 (27.2)	79.6 (26.4)	72.8 (22.7)	58.7 (14.8)	43.8 (6.6)	38.6 (3.7)	57.2 (14.0)
Daily mean °F (°C)	27.0 (−2.8)	28.8 (−1.8)	32.4 (0.2)	37.3 (2.9)	46.3 (7.9)	54.6 (12.6)	61.1 (16.2)	60.2 (15.7)	53.8 (12.1)	44.6 (7.0)	35.4 (1.9)	28.1 (−2.2)	42.5 (5.8)
Mean daily minimum °F (°C)	13.9 (−10.1)	15.7 (−9.1)	20.2 (−6.6)	22.1 (−5.5)	30.1 (−1.1)	36.8 (2.7)	41.4 (5.2)	40.5 (4.7)	34.2 (1.2)	26.9 (−2.8)	19.6 (−6.9)	13.3 (−10.4)	26.2 (−3.2)
Record low °F (°C)	−17 (−27)	−20 (−29)	−10 (−23)	−2 (−19)	12 (−11)	21 (−6)	28 (−2)	26 (−3)	16 (−9)	−6 (−21)	−7 (−22)	−24 (−31)	−24 (−31)
Average precipitation inches (mm)	10.0 (250)	8.0 (200)	8.3 (210)	4.4 (110)	1.5 (38)	1.2 (30)	1.2 (30)	0.8 (20)	1.3 (33)	4.6 (120)	9.2 (230)	8.5 (220)	59.0 (1,500)
Average snowfall inches (cm)	54.9 (139)	49.8 (126)	36.4 (92)	21.8 (55)	7.8 (20)	0.3 (0.76)	0.0 (0.0)	0.0 (0.0)	0.6 (1.5)	4.3 (11)	23.9 (61)	46.9 (119)	246.7 (625.26)
Average precipitation days (≥ 0.01 in)	11	11	11	8	6	4	2	2	3	5	9	11	83
Source: Weatherbase
