= Ligo =

LIGO or Ligo may refer to:

- LIGO, gravitational wave observatory site
- LIGO Scientific Collaboration gravitational wave observatory scientific collaboration
- LIGO (film), a 2019 American documentary film
- James Ligo (died December 2017), Anglican bishop

Līgo may refer to:

- Līgo Parish, Latvia
- Līgo, a Latvian holiday

== See also ==
- Ligo Ligo (disambiguation)
- Lego (disambiguation)
