= Les Guthman =

American film director

Les Guthman is an American director, writer, editor and production executive, who has the distinction of both having produced three of the 20 Top Adventure Films of All Time, according to Men's Journal magazine, and having won the National Academy of Sciences' (U.S) nationwide competition to find the best new idea in science television, which led to his film, Three Nights at the Keck, hosted by actor John Lithgow.

He is currently producer, director and writer of the Advanced LIGO Documentary Project, an 11-year collaboration with Caltech, MIT and the LIGO Laboratory, funded by the National Science Foundation, MathWorks and Caltech. The Advanced LIGO Documentary Project was formed in the summer of 2015 to document and produce the definitive documentary about Advanced LIGO's search for, and expected detection of, the first gravitational waves, a discovery that would open up the 95% of the universe that was dark to our existing observatories and space based telescopes—the violent warped side described by Caltech's Kip Thorne 30 years ago in Black Holes and Time Warps.

On September 14, 2015, Guthman and his team were on location filming at the LIGO Livingston Observatory when the historic detection was made. Over the next five months, he had exclusive film access to document the long, careful process of scientific verification that was conducted by the LIGO Scientific Collaboration to confirm that the received signal was in fact a gravitational wave, as predicted by Albert Einstein more than 100 years ago.

On October 3, 2017 LIGO physicists Rai Weiss, Kip Thorne and Barry Barish won the Nobel Prize in Physics.

Principal photography on his feature documentary LIGO (film) finished in Stockholm for Nobel Week in December 2017. LIGO (film) was completed in May 2019 and won 14 film festival awards in 2020-2022, including two Best Documentary awards: At the Solaris Film Festival in Vienna. and the Sigma Xi STEM Art & Film Festival.

His latest LIGO documentary, "Squeezed Light: Breaking the Quantum Limit," won a Best Documentary Award in its first film festival, the 2026 Physics on Film festival held by the Institute of Physics in London.

He also wrote and directed a ten-part video series, LIGO: A Discovery That Shook the World distributed on YouTube.

In December 2019, National Geographic named the LIGO detections at the top of its list of The 20 Top Scientific Discoveries of the Decade.

Guthman produced the two LIGO programs at the 2016 World Science Festival in New York, including the main stage Saturday night panel moderated by physicist and best-selling author Brian Greene, and featuring Weiss and Barish, three of their colleagues and four short videos from the Advanced LIGO Documentary Project's exclusive footage inside the discovery.

In 2013-2014, Guthman worked with New York Times executive editor Jill Abramson to create a science television series based on the newspaper's Science Times section.

For five years from 2008 to 2013, he was involved in 3D production and research, while making two feature documentaries in HD, Skiing Everest and Saturn's Embrace, along with building the XPLR Channel and brand for webcasting adventure, expedition, environmental and science documentaries in partnership with Ted Leonsis' SnagFilms.com and on Amazon Video. As part of his 3D work, Guthman licensed the exclusive worldwide 3D rights to Carnaval in Rio de Janeiro, in a partnership with Brazil's TV Globo.

Guthman was chairman of The Explorers Club's annual Artist in Exploration competition, sponsored by Rolex; from 2013 to 2016, and chairman of its $100,000 Foundation Mamont - Explorers Club World Exploration Challenge. He is also a Fellow of the Royal Canadian Geographical Society.

== Film and television career ==
As founding Executive Vice President and Executive Producer of Outside Television, Les Guthman produced 28 feature-length expedition, adventure and environmental documentaries, including Michael Brown's Farther Than the Eye Can See, which was nominated for two primetime Emmy Awards in 2004, the awards for Outstanding Sports Documentary and Outstanding Sports Cinematography. Farther Than the Eye Can See, the film of blind climber Erik Weihenmayer’s renowned ascent of Mount Everest, won 18 international film festival awards. Altogether, there have been 223 film festival screenings of Guthman's films since 2002 and they have won 41 film festival awards.

Outside was the second major American magazine that Guthman brought to national television. In 1991, he created and produced the Discover Magazine series at the Walt Disney Company, based on Discover magazine. He produced the Discover Magazine TV series for two seasons on The Disney Channel, and then, working with Disney President and CEO Frank Wells, moved it to the Discovery Channel, where it became a signature series. At the same time, he developed an unproduced series with HBO based on a comedian's view of science.

One of the other highlights of Guthman's leadership of Outside Television was the expedition and expedition film, Into the Tsangpo Gorge, which he produced and also co-wrote with director Scott Lindgren. The expedition achieved the epic first whitewater descent of the “Everest of rivers," through the 18,000-ft.-deep Tsangpo Gorge (Yarlung Tsangpo Grand Canyon) in Tibet and was recognized by The Explorers Club as one of the most accomplished expeditions of modern times. Into the Tsangpo Gorge aired on NBC Sports in May 2002.

Into the Tsangpo Gorge and Farther Than the Eye Can See, along with his production, Into the Thunder Dragon, by filmmaker Sean White, were honored by Men’s Journal magazine as three of the 20 Top Adventure Films of All Time.

His Outside Television production, In the Shadow of the Condor won the 2001 Teddy Award for Best Conservation Film, named in honor of President Theodore Roosevelt. His production The Teachings of Moises Chavez was runner-up for the same award in 2002.

He co-created and produced the CableAce Award-nominated science series 21st Century, which included the last interview with Dr. Jonas Salk, discoverer of the polio vaccine. 21st Century was co-created and hosted by NPR and KCRW host Warren Olney.

Guthman has directed 13 documentaries, including Messner (2002), the first documentary about Reinhold Messner, world's greatest mountain climber, since Werner Herzog’s The Dark Glow of the Mountains in 1984. Messner was an Opening Night selection of the Mountainfilm in Telluride festival in 2004. He also made two highly regarded environmental films: The Hudson Riverkeepers (1998) and The Waterkeepers (2000). In 2008, on the tenth anniversary of The Hudson Riverkeepers, Guthman re-edited the two films into one feature-length documentary under the title, The Waterkeepers. It premiered at the Environmental Film Festival in the Nation's Capital and was released on iTunes and Amazon Video. He has written 15 documentaries and edited 12.

Churning the Sea of Time: A Journey Up the Mekong to Angkor, premiered at Lincoln Center in April 2006. It was an official selection of the Museum of Modern Art's "Directors Fortnight Expanded" in 2007 and was shown at the Royal Geographical Society in London, the Smithsonian in Washington, DC; and the Asia Society in New York, among other featured screenings.

Guthman's 2009 feature documentary, Skiing Everest (film), features the handful of skiers worldwide who climb Mount Everest and other 8,000-meter peaks alpine style (without using supplemental oxygen, or hiring porters and guides), and click into their skis. Filmed around the world, it includes skiers Mike Marolt, who was also director of photography, Steve Marolt, Hans Kammerlander, Chris Davenport, Laura Bokas, Mark Newcomb and Fredrik Ericsson. Skiing Everest was licensed by ESPN in 2011 for broadcast in the United States and Europe. It debuted on ESPN Classic in November 2011 with six primetime broadcasts over the weekend of November 18–20. Skiing Everest (film) was converted from 2D to 3D in 2012 by Blue Hemisphere 3D.

His 2011 documentary Saturn's Embrace brings to the screen the Cassini-Huygens mission's exploration of Saturn and its moons through Cassini's unsurpassed photographs and radar images; and explores the stunning discovery of salt water, with its possibility of primitive life, on the moon Enceladus. The film features, and is written and co-produced by, Dr. Carolyn Porco, head of the Cassini-Huygens digital imaging team, and includes commentary by evolutionary biologist and author Richard Dawkins.

In 1996, Les Guthman made Corwin, a feature-length documentary about Norman Corwin, the legendary writer, producer and director during the Golden Age of Radio. Corwin aired on PBS, having been licensed by PBS stations WNET in 1996 and then by KCET in 1999. Actor Charles Laughton, in the early 1940s, is quoted in the film as saying, "There is no actor in Hollywood or on Broadway, who would not drop what he is doing to be in one of Norman Corwin's radio plays. We all look up to him as a writer of the highest caliber and one of the most important writers in America today." KCET in Los Angeles re-broadcast "Corwin" in October 2011 as a memorial tribute when Mr. Corwin died at the age of 101.

In 1999, Guthman won the National Academy of Sciences nationwide competition to select the best new series concept in science television, which resulted in his film, Three Nights at the Keck, hosted by actor John Lithgow.

In 1989, Guthman brought the annual Robert F. Kennedy Human Rights Award ceremony to PBS in a primetime broadcast hosted by Tom Brokaw and featuring a human rights address by Sen. Ted Kennedy and a keynote speech by Polish Solidarity leader Lech Wałęsa. The ceremony honored the Tienanmen Square protests of 1989 and the fall of the Berlin Wall the same year. The Robert F. Kennedy Human Rights Award was given to Chinese dissident Fang Lizhi, who was being protected inside the U.S. Embassy in Beijing at the time of the broadcast.

Les Guthman's credits include almost a decade at NBC News in New York, where he was a producer and writer for Tom Brokaw, as well as senior political writer and Manager of Election Analysis.

He was Story Editor and Story Consultant on Visions, the Peabody Award-winning landmark PBS series, which commissioned 80 scripts and produced 40 feature-length independent films and television stage productions over four seasons at KCET in Los Angeles. One of its films, Alambrista, won the Camera d'Or award at the 1978 Cannes Film Festival. Michael Arlen, the television critic for The New Yorker, wrote in his review of Visions, "One might say that, halfway through its first year, Visions is already the most interesting and original regular American dramatic program that can be found anywhere on American television."

Visions lasted four seasons, after which Les Guthman joined Norman Lear’s Tandem Productions, where he produced and co-wrote two feature film projects that he had developed during the final year of Visions. One was a collaboration with director St. Clair Bourne and playwright Ron Milner for a feature film about the civil rights era confrontation between young black voting rights activists and the Ku Klux Klan in Bogalusa, Louisiana.

Guthman's other films are Paragliding Across America (2001), the expedition of world-record-holding paraglider Will Gadd to become the first to paraglide across the United States; Marathon of the Sands (2000), the world's most grueling ultra-marathon competition in the Moroccan Sahara; Eco-Sanctuary Belize (2001) and Ten Adventures of a Lifetime (2004).

== XPLR Online ==
In 2004, he created XPLR Productions, based in New York. XPLR Productions partnered with Snagfilms in 2008 to create the webcasting channel XPLR for adventure, environmental and science documentaries, including many of the films listed above. Selected XPLR-produced and distributed films also stream on Amazon Video, Hulu, Roku, EPIX, Comcast Xfinity, Verizon FIOS, Xbox, Redbox Instant, Google Television and Sony, Panasonic and Visio televisions, and are available on mobile devices and tablets through the Snagfilms and Amazon Video apps.

== Publishing ==
On the fifth anniversary of the historic LIGO discovery, Guthman published A Discovery That Shook the World, an ebook based on his eight-part video series of the same name.

Previously, he had edited three books by three-time Pulitzer Prize winning editorial cartoonist Paul Conrad: The King and Us, Pro and Conrad, and Paul Conrad: Drawing the Line.

== Explorers Club and Royal Canadian Geographical Society ==
A member of the Explorers Club in New York since 2000, he was head of the Explorers Club Film Festival in 2008, and 2015. He chaired its Rolex Artist-in-Exploration competition from 2013 to 2016 and the club's $100,000 World Exploration Challenge grant competition, sponsored by the Mamont Foundation. He was inducted as a Fellow of the Royal Canadian Geographical Society in 2017.

== Filmography ==
Year	Film	Functioned as			
Year	Film	Director	Producer	Writer	Editor
1989	The Robert F. Kennedy Human Rights Award on PBS		Yes		
1991-1994	DISCOVER MAGAZINE Series	Yes	Yes	Yes	
1993	The Ten Great Unanswered Questions of Science	Yes	Yes	Yes	
1995	21st Century: Jonas Salk		Yes		
1995	21st Century: Ed Stone		Yes		
1995	21st Century: Bran Ferren		Yes		
1996	Corwin	Yes	Yes	Yes	
1996	Krakauer and Brokaw		Yes		
1998-2004	OUTSIDE TELEVISION PRESENTS Series	Yes	Yes	Yes	
1998	The Hudson Riverkeepers	Yes	Yes	Yes	
1998	Three Nights At the Keck	Yes	Yes	Yes	
1998	Three Great American Adventures		Yes		
1999	The Bihac, Bosnia Kayak Club		Yes		
1999	A Life of My Choice		Yes		
1999	Marathon of the Sands		Yes		
1999	Liquid Off the Throne of Shiva		Yes		
1999	High Mountain Wilderness		Yes		
2000	The Waterkeepers	Yes	Yes	Yes	Yes
2000	Marathon of the Sands 2000	Yes	Yes	Yes	Yes
2000	Rivers Into the Unknown		Yes		
2000	Conquering the Turrialba Volcano		Yes		
2000	Eco-Sanctuary Belize	Yes	Yes	Yes	Yes
2001	The Rain Forest Teachings of Moises Chavez		Yes		
2001	On the White Nile: Trouble on the River That Roars		Yes		
2001	Liquid Cubed: Spawning Grounds		Yes		
2001	Paragliding Across America	Yes	Yes	Yes	Yes
2001	Fear Not				Yes
2001	Non Temere				Yes
2002	Into the Tsangpo Gorge		Yes	Yes	
2002	Messner	Yes	Yes	Yes	Yes
2002	Ice Challenger		Yes		
2002	In the Shadow of the Condor		Yes		
2002	Fire on Ice		Yes		
2003	Yunnan Great Rivers Expedition		Yes	Yes	Yes
2003	Farther Than the Eye Can See		Yes		
2003	Into the Thunder Dragon		Yes		
2003	Elements of Adrenaline (Burning Time)		Yes		
2004	Never Ending Thermal		Yes		
2004	Ten Adventures of a Lifetime	Yes	Yes	Yes	Yes
2004	Blood Roll				Yes
2005	Blood Roll in Venice		Yes		Yes
2006	Churning the Sea of Time: A Journey Up the Mekong to Angkor	Yes	Yes	Yes	Yes
2006	P-Spin				Yes
2007	Explore: China		Yes		
2007	P-Spin at Pulkovo Observatory				Yes
2008	The Wave 3D		Yes		
2008	Tierra Sin Males				Yes
2009	Skiing Everest (film)	Yes	Yes	Yes	Yes
2009	Tierra Sin Males in Venice		Yes		Yes
2010	The Waterkeepers	Yes	Yes	Yes	Yes
2011	Saturn's Embrace	Yes	Yes	Yes	Yes
2013	KDI in Kibera				Yes
2014	The Explorers Club	Yes	Yes	Yes	Yes
2015	Kairos				Yes
2016	Lost at Sea				Yes
2016	Balafre				Yes
2015-2019	LIGO	Yes	Yes	Yes	Yes
2017	Mirrors That Hang on Glass Threads	Yes	Yes	Yes	Yes
2017	The New Age of Gravitational Wave Astronomy	Yes	Yes	Yes	Yes
2017	GW170817: So Many Staggering Insights About Our Universe	Yes	Yes	Yes	Yes
2017	LIGO in Stockholm	Yes	Yes	Yes	Yes
2018	Helix				Yes
2018	Inventing LIGO	Yes	Yes	Yes	Yes
2018	Advanced LIGO	Yes	Yes	Yes	Yes
2018	Movies Made From Numbers	Yes	Yes	Yes	Yes
2019	LIGO and Beyond	Yes	Yes	Yes	Yes
2021	aLIGO Snaps	Yes	Yes	Yes	Yes
2022	LEAP!				Yes
2025	Squeezed Light: Breaking the Quantum Limit	Yes	Yes	Yes	Yes
2025	Rai Weiss: LIGO's Heart and Soul	Yes	Yes	Yes	Yes
2026	Symposium Celebrating the Work of Rainer Weiss	Yes	Yes		Yes
