= John Callahan (skier) =

American cross-country skier (born 1962)

Personal information
- Born: September 15, 1962 (age 63) Los Angeles, California, United States

Sport
- Sport: Cross-country skiing

John Callahan (born September 15, 1962) is an American cross-country skier. He competed in the men's 30 kilometre classical event at the 1992 Winter Olympics. In 2003, he was the leader of an expedition to Mount Everest, appearing in the documentary film Skiing Everest.
