= Skiing Everest =

2009 documentary film directed by Les Guthman and Mike Marolt

- Directed by: Les Guthman and Mike Marolt
- Written by: Les Guthman
- Produced by: Mike Marolt; Les Guthman; Kenny Fields
- Starring: Mike Marolt; Steve Marolt; John Callahan; Jim Gile; Hans Kammerlander; Chris Davenport; Laura Bokas; Mark Newcomb
- Cinematography: Mike Marolt; Cherie Silvera
- Edited by: Les Guthman
- Music by: Richard Horowitz
- Distributed by: Montezuma Basin Productions; Cinetic Media
- Release date: January 10, 2009
- Running time: 82 minutes
- Country: United States
- Language: English

Skiing Everest is a 2009 American adventure documentary directed by Les Guthman and Mike Marolt; written by Les Guthman, and featuring high-altitude ski mountaineers Mike Marolt, Steve Marolt, John Callahan, Jim Gile, Hans Kammerlander, Chris Davenport, Laura Bakos, Mark Newcomb. The film also features Fredrik Ericsson, who died skiing on K2 in 2010.

Filmed by Mike Marolt over ten years, Skiing Everest tells the story of a group of friends, led by Marolt and his twin brother Steve, who grew up in Aspen, Colorado, and went on to become the first skiers from the Western Hemisphere to ski from above 8,000 metres (26,000 ft) when they skied from the summit of Shisha Pangma in Tibet in 2000, and then tried the highest slopes in the world on Mount Everest and Cho Oyu.

The film follows the Marolts and their childhood friends Jim Gile, and John Callahan, who was an Olympic cross-country skier, on skiing expeditions into the death zone above 8,000 m, without using oxygen.

Skiing Everest also tells the history of high-altitude skiing, dating back to the 1930s, and includes interviews with Hans Kammerlander, who was the first to ski from the summit of Everest; Laura Bakos, the first woman to ski from the summit of an 8000-meter peak; and Chris Davenport, the two-time world extreme skiing champion, who is an avid ski mountaineer as well. And it tells the Marolts' personal story: the sons of U.S. Olympic skier Max Marolt, who grew up in Aspen, before it became an internationally famous ski destination and who took to skiing in the hope of escaping what was an isolated, decaying former mining town.

Skiing Everest was shown in film festivals and theaters in 2009-2011 and was bought by ESPN in July 2011 for broadcast in the United States and Europe. It debuted on ESPN Classic in November 2011 with six primetime broadcasts over the weekend of November 18–20.

Skiing Everest was converted from 2D to 3D in 2012 by Blue Hemisphere 3D. It will premiere in December 2012 and be released in theaters and on 3D Blu-ray Disc in January 2013.

== See also ==
- List of ski descents of Eight-Thousanders
