= Antonio Pasqualino International Puppet Museum =

Coordinates: 38°07′07″N 13°22′14″E

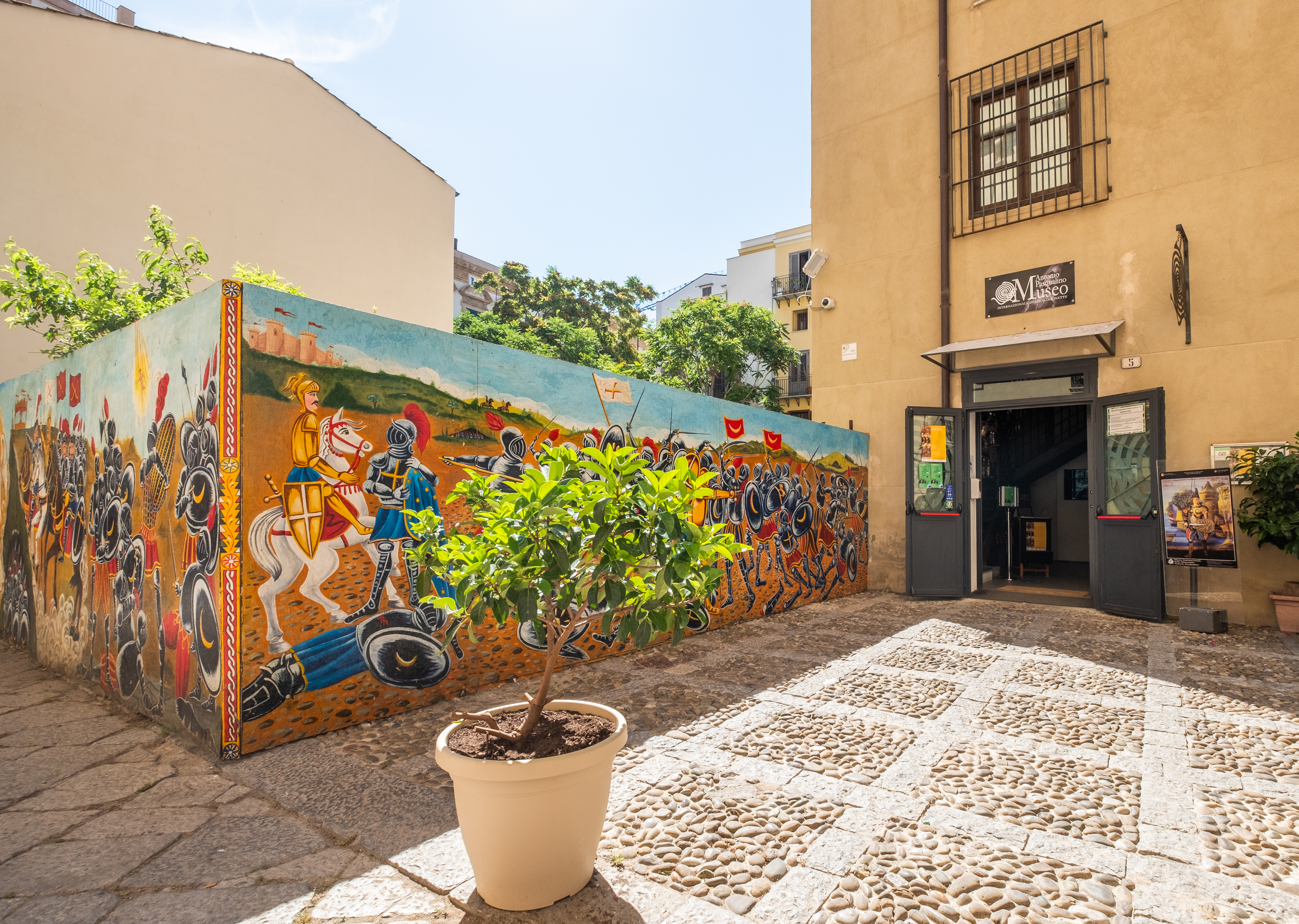
- Established: 1975
- Location: Piazzetta Antonio Pasqualino 5, Palermo
- Type: Ethnographic museum
- Collections: Objects relevant in the demo-ethno-anthropological field; Opera dei pupi; Italian and international traditional puppet theatre and performing arts; contemporary puppet art
- Collection size: 5,000
- Founder: Associazione per la conservazione delle tradizioni popolari
- Director: Rosario Perricone
- Website: www.museodellemarionette.it

The Antonio Pasqualino International Puppet Museum of Palermo operates in the field of national and international, traditional and contemporary puppetry.

Founded in 1975 by the Association for the Conservation of Popular Traditions, it houses a vast collection of over 5,000 pieces, including marionettes, hand puppets, shadow puppets, and stage machines from all over the world. Among these, the museum preserves the largest and most complete collection of pupi of the Palermo, Catania, and Neapolitan type and constitutes a center for the safeguarding, conservation, enhancement, promotion and dissemination of the heritage linked to this theatrical practice which is representative of the identity of the territory.

The collection is enriched by numerous materials used in the other puppet traditions that, as well as Sicilian Opera dei pupi, have been declared by UNESCO as Masterpieces of the Oral and Intangible Heritage of Humanity as well as contemporary artists' puppets created as part of the museum's new productions.

For the correlation and synergy between its multiple activities and functions, the Antonio Pasqualino International Puppet Museum, which has become more and more a "performance museum", was awarded the anthropological prize "Costantino Nigra" in 2001 for the museums section and in October 2017 the ICOM Italia Award – "Museum of the Year" which rewarded its attractiveness in relation to the public.

== History ==
The history of the museum is inextricably linked to Antonio Pasqualino, who died in 1995. He was a surgeon and an anthropologist from Palermo. He was a son of the painter Lia Noto and of Guglielmo Pasqualino di Marineo. Pasqualino in the second half of the Twentieth century worked to safeguard, promote and revitalize the Opera dei Pupi in a period of profound crisis for this theatrical practice. In 1965, together with a group of high-brows, he founded the Association for the Conservation of Popular Traditions and, together with his wife, Janne Vibaek collected many testimonies: from stage texts to puppets, theaters and furnishings, saving them from destruction and oblivion.

The economic and social transformation of Italy and Sicily in the middle of the last century caused the distancing of the traditional audience – mainly made up of men from the lower classes, who began to no longer mirror themselves in the models conveyed by the stories and characters of the shows. Empty of their traditional public, the puppeteers from all over Sicily began to close their theaters in search of more profitable activities, often selling or giving away their so-called "mestiere", or the set of theatrical props necessary for the staging of the shows.

After ten years of activity, the association founded the International Puppet Museum, in 1975, with the aim of restoring the heritage that Antonio Pasqualino had acquired in the meantime to Italian citizens: a “mestiere” of the Opera dei pupi pertaining to the Palermo school, belonging to the historic family of Gaspare Canino; and one of the Catania school, coming from the theater of Natale Meli.

In the opening year, the first Review of the Opera dei pupi was organized, to which puppeteers from all over Sicily were invited to participate annually. The goal was to strengthen the relationship between Sicilian puppeteers and the public, thus favoring the transmission – still entrusted to orality today – of the vast wealth of knowledge of which they were and are custodians.

In 1985, the Review of the Opera dei pupi became the Morgana Festival, opening up to the traditions of puppetry from other countries of the world and to contemporary art. Even today, the museum annually organizes the Festival, inviting traditional and contemporary companies from Italy and abroad as well as integrating the theatrical programs with related activities including exhibitions, conferences and educational workshops.

=== The Association for the Conservation of Popular Traditions ===
The Association for the Conservation of Popular Traditions was established in 1965 by Antonio Pasqualino, with the involvement of a group of scholars and high-brows.

For over fifty years the association has been committed to safeguarding popular traditions and in particular to the safeguarding and promotion of the Opera dei pupi. This commitment becamwìe more evident when it engaged to support the candidacy of the Opera dei pupi aimed at inscribing it in the UNESCO list. Successfully, in May 2001 the Opera dei pupi was declared as a Unesco Masterpiece of the oral and intangible heritage of humanity, and in 2008, it was registered in the Representative List of the Intangible Cultural Heritage.

In 2018 the association promoted the establishment of the "Italian network of organizations for the protection, promotion and enhancement of the Opera dei pupi", recognized by the Italian Ministry for Cultural Heritage and Activities and Tourism as a competent territorial body in the field of safeguard and representative of the tradition of the Sicilian Opera dei pupi. The network brings together 13 Sicilian puppet companies and various Italian cultural and research bodies (including the Central Institute for Intangible Heritage, the Italian Society for Museography and Demo-ethno-anthropological Heritage - SIMBDEA, the Ignazio Buttitta Foundation and the Kiklos Cultural Association). The association, as the reference subject of the network, is responsible for the drafting of the "Plan of Measures for the Safeguarding of the Sicilian Opera dei Pupi", which aims to promote an ''effective plan of actions to safeguard, promote and enhance the element of the Opera dei pupi as part of a governance participation and a sustainable development project, consistent with the Operational Directives of the Convention for the Safeguarding of the Intangible Cultural Heritage.

In addition to this, in 2014 the association was accredited as a consultant non-governmental organization to the UNESCO Intergovernmental Committee of the Intangible Cultural Heritage (registration number NGO-90316). In 2015, the association was registered in the National Research Registry of the Italian Ministry of Education, University and Research – MIUR (identification code 000358_ART3) and since 2018, it is recognized as one of the cultural institutes of significant and ascertained value by the Italian Ministry for Cultural Heritage and Activities; finally, in 2019 it was welcomed in the AICI – Association of Italian Cultural Institutions.

=== A performance museum ===
Since its foundation, the International Puppet Museum has combined museum activity with performance: it firstly re-proposed traditional puppet shows, and later also research and innovation performances. Therefore, it was never conceived as a place for the conservation of dead things, but it immediately engages to revitalize traditional performative practices. The annual "Festival di Morgana, previously name Review of the Opera dei pupi, on the one hand allows significant insights into the Sicilian and southern Italian repertoire, on the other hand it helps Sicilian puppeteers find a new professional dignity through the exchange with puppeteers from all over the world and contemporary artists, thus laying the foundations for a study of extra-European theatrical practices both related to puppetry theatre and forms of traditional ritual theater. Since then the theatrical activity of the museum has welcomed the production of innovative shows, in collaboration with writers, painters, visual artists, contemporary musicians (e.g. Calvino, Guttuso, Kantor, Baj, Pennisi). This exchange and collaboration with Italian and foreign companyes in the traditional and contemporary puppet field has allowed the acquisition of works interesting from both an ethno-anthropological and an artistic points of view consolidating the image of the museum as a performance museum engaged with heritage responsibility, which continues its fervent activity between comparative research, museographic experimentation, revival of shows and support for Sicilian puppet companies.

== The collection ==
The exhibition itinerary dysplays a collection consisting of over 5,000 animated figures (pupi, marionettes, hand puppets, shadow puppets), theatrical props and billboards, from Italy and from abroad. Some of them are used the eight traditional puppet theatres of different cultures and countries, that as well as Sicilian Opera dei Pupi, were declared by UNESCO "Masterpieces of the oral and intangible heritage of humanity", and some contemporary artist's puppets created for the museum's new productions.

=== The Opera dei pupi and other UNESCO masterpieces ===
The first nuclei of the museum's collection were formed around the Sicilian Opera dei pupi. Today the museum houses the largest and most complete collection of pupi from Palermo, Catania and Naples and, among other things, it preserves the complete set of materials from three Opera dei pupi theaters: one of the Palermo tradition, which belonged to Gaspare Canino from Alcamo; one of the Catania tradition, which belonged to Natale Meli of Reggio Calabria; one of Neapolitan tradition that belonged to the Perna family of Frattamaggiore. The oldest pupo in the museum is "Carinda", dated to 1828 and once belonged to the Canino family. According to this family oral tradition, this marionette was the first armored pupo built by Don Liberto Canino.

The museum also exhibits other collections declared by UNESCO as "Masterpieces of the oral and intangible heritage of humanity": the Japanese Ningyo Johruri Bunraku, the Indonesian Wayang kulit, the Cambodian shadow theater Sbek Thom, the puppet-masks of Nigeria-Benin called Gelede, Korea's puppet theater Namsadang Nori – Kkoktu-gaksi Norum, Turkish Karagöz and Sri Lanka's Rūkada Nātya puppets.

=== Animated figures in Europe and the East ===
The collection includes marionettes and hand puppets from Northern Italy, Southern Italy (such as the Neapolitan guarrattelle and Sicilian tutui) and other European countries. The museum also exhibits numerous examples from Asia: Indian shadow puppets, Javanese rod puppets (Wayang golek) and two-dimensional figures (Wayang Klitik), string puppets from Burma (Yoke thai tabin) and India (Kathputli), water puppets from Vietnam (Mua roi nuoc), shadow puppets of Malaysia, Siam, and China. A rare puppet is from the New Hebrides (Temes nevinbur).

=== African animated figures ===
In Africa puppet theater presents different forms and is linked to both sacred life and entertainment. The museum exhibits the Malian puppets known as Do: used in the Bambara theater, they are the first African puppet theater to be known in Europe. The aforementioned Gelede from Nigeria-Benin and the Congo rod puppets, called Kebe kebe and used by the Mbochi and Kuyu people, are mainly linked to the cult of their ancestors.

=== The contemporary section ===
In the "Winter garden" of the museum, a space also used for temporary installations, and in the other museum's rooms, contemporary works of art are exhibited. They were made for three shows which were produced by the International Puppet Museum between the 1980s and 1990s, in collaboration with international figures. There one may find: the sets made by Renato Guttuso and used in Italo Calvino's Forest-Root-Labyrinth show, directed by Roberto Andò (1987); the puppets and stage machines created by the Polish artist and director Tadeusz Kantor for the show Machine of Love and Death (1987); and the puppets by Enrico Baj made for the show Le bleu-blanc-rouge et le Noir performed by Masimo Schuster's company Arc-en-terre (1990). Table puppets that Enrico Baj made for two other shows by Massimo Schuster, Roncesvalles and Mahabharata, were recently acquired.

=== Exhibition itinerary ===
The museum is spread over three levels and houses numerous exhibition spaces, a bookshop, a library, a video library, a tape library and a theatre capable of hosting a substantial theatrical program.

Ground floor	Ticket office
Ground floor	Bookshop
First floor	Wayang kulit and wayang klitik, Indonesian puppet traditions
First floor	Sbek Thom, Cambodiand shadow puppets
First floor	Tholobomalatta and Togalu bombe, Indian shadow puppets from Andhra Pradesh and Mysore
Second floor	Sceneries, puppets and scenic machinesof the shows: Foresta, radice, labirinto written by Italo Calvino, scenes by Renato Guttuso, directed by Roberto Andò; Macchina dell'amore e della morte by Tadeusz Kantor; Le bleu-blanc-rouge et le Noir by Massimo Schister's company Arc-en-terre, puppets by Enrico Baj; Roncisvalle and Mahabharata by Massimo Schuster, puppets by Enrico Baj.
Second floor	Yoke thay thabin, string puppets from Myanmar
Second floor	Bunraku – Ningyō jōruri, puppets from Japan
Second floor	Rukada, string puppets from Sri Lanka
Second floor	Kathputli, string puppets from Rajasthan
Second floor	African puppets: Do, rod puppets from Mali; Kebe kebe, rod puppets from Congo; Gledé, mask-puppets of the Yoruba people.
Second floor	Temes nevinbur, rod puppet from the New Hebrides.
Second floor	Mua roi nuoc, water puppets from Vietnam.
Second floor	Traditional string and glove puppets from Northern Italy, France, Spain and United Kingdom
Second floor	String puppets from the Teatro dei piccoli founded by Vittorio Podrecca
Second floor	Hun krabok, puppets from Thailand
Second floor	Namsadang Nori – Kkoktu-gaksi Norum, glove puppets from Korea
Second floor	Wayang golek, rod puppets from Java
Second floor	Pupi from Palermo, Catania and Naples
Second floor	Theatre hall

=== The Giuseppe Leggio Library and the Multimedia Archive ===
The "Giuseppe Leggio" Library is annexed to the museum, which collects thirty thousand volumes on puppets, marionettes and popular traditions. Particularly valuable are the collections of manuscripts of the nineteenth and early twentieth centuries, belonged to the puppeteers Gaspare Canino and Natale Meli, as well as the collection of knightly handouts published between the end of the Nineteenth and the beginning of the Twentieth century. In particular, the first edition of the History of the Paladins of France by Giusto Lodico is still today the main source for the staging of traditional Opera dei pupi shows. Other sections are dedicated to popular traditions, cultural anthropology, ethnography, museography, linguistics, education, Sicilian history, theatre, art and literature. In 2006 the library became part of the national library center (SBN Center of the Municipal Library of Palermo).

The museum also houses a multimedia archive. The photo library holds photos of the objects for the Inventory and of the installations that have taken place in the various locations of the museum; photos of the shows as well as of the various initiatives carried out over the years with particular reference to study initiatives (conventions, conferences, seminars), exhibitions in Italy and abroad. The audio-video library preserves reels of voice recordings relating to performances of various forms of puppetry, interviews and conferences dating back to the 1960s and already transferred to CD; audio cassette recordings; video-recordings and materials collected in part on behalf of the State Discotheque and in collaboration with the Institute of the History of Popular Traditions of the University of Palermo. These materials have been digitized or are in the process of being digitized and are all available upon request. The multimedia archives are regularly increased thanks to the incessant documentation activity carried out by the association.

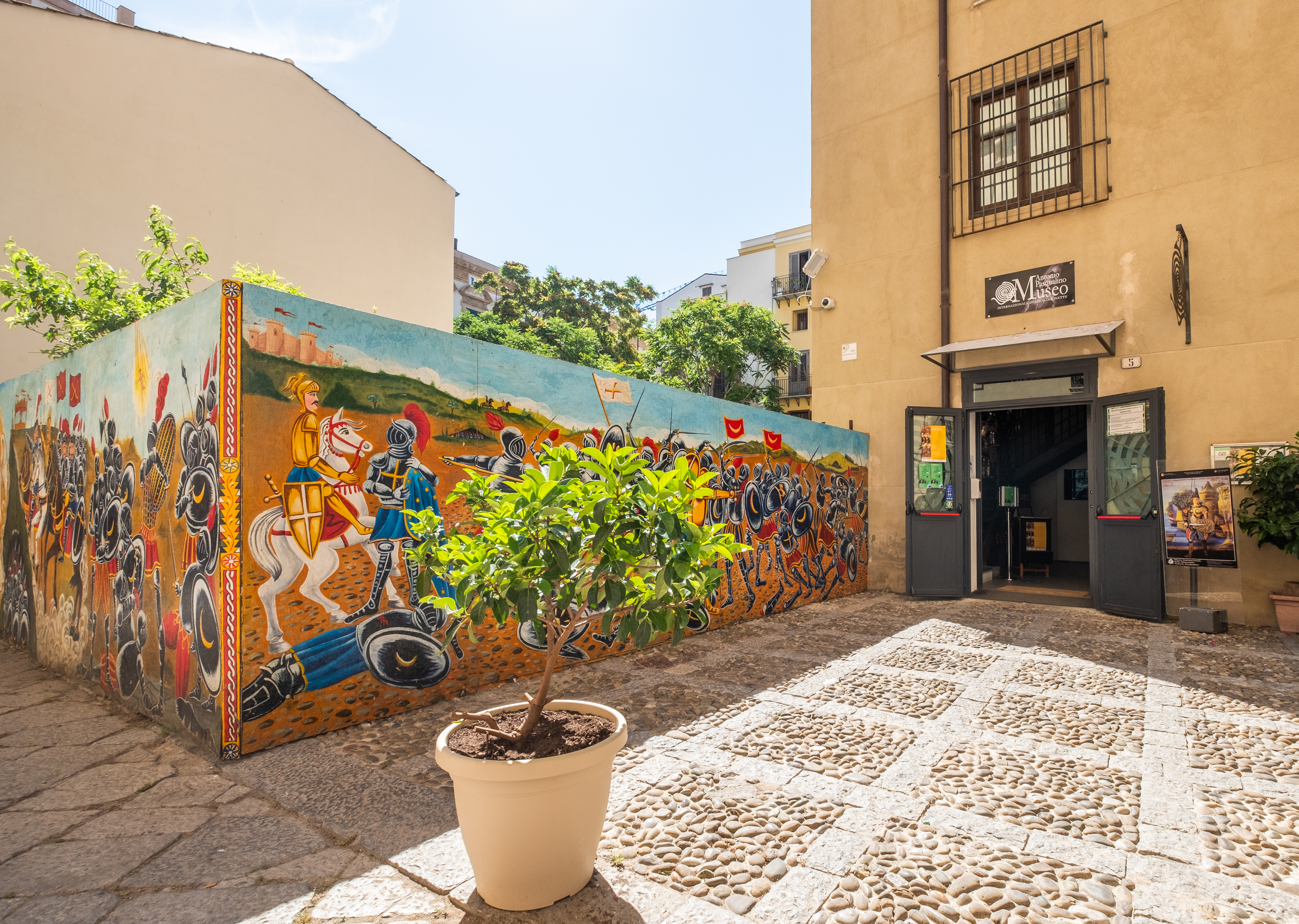

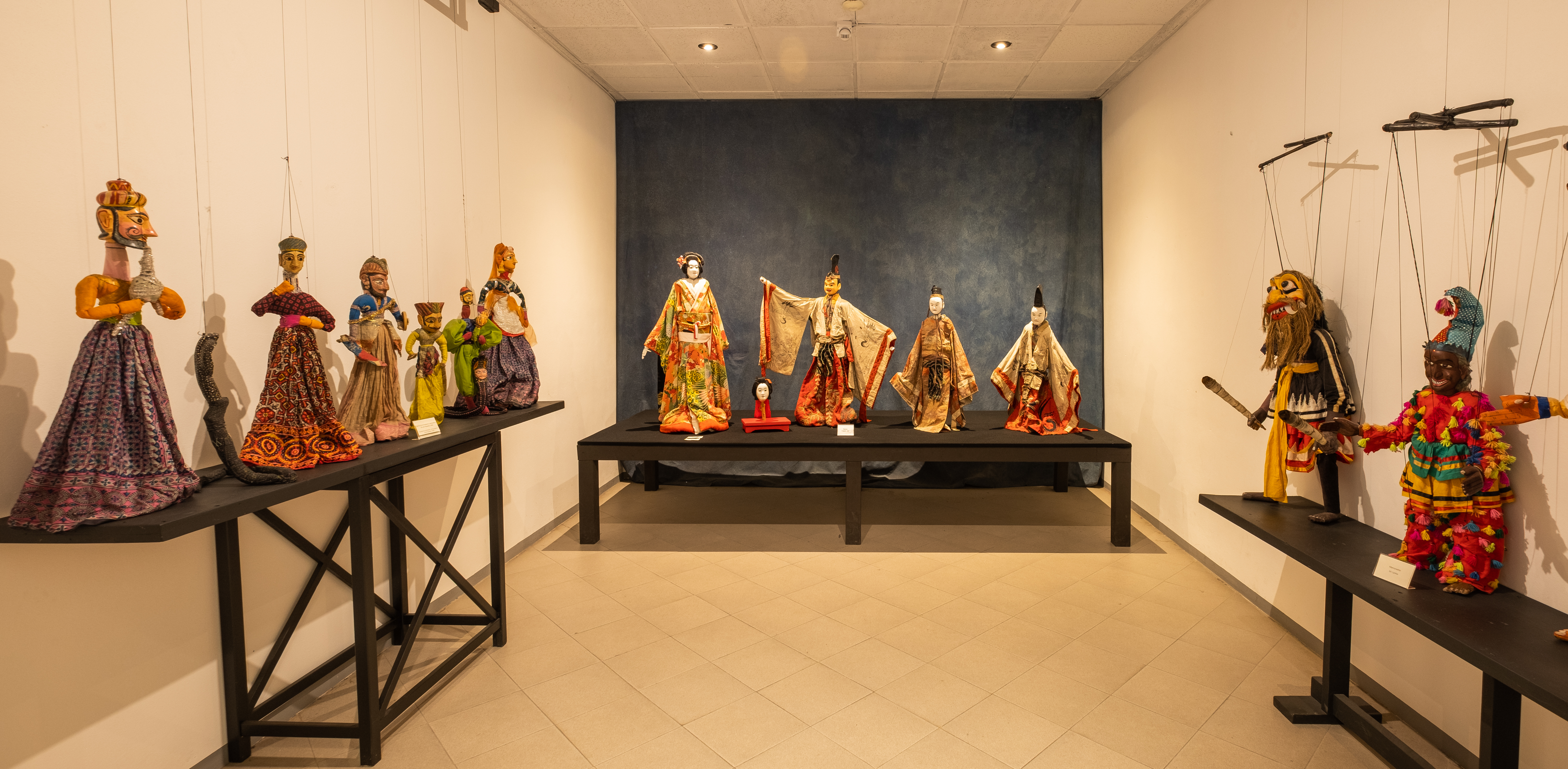

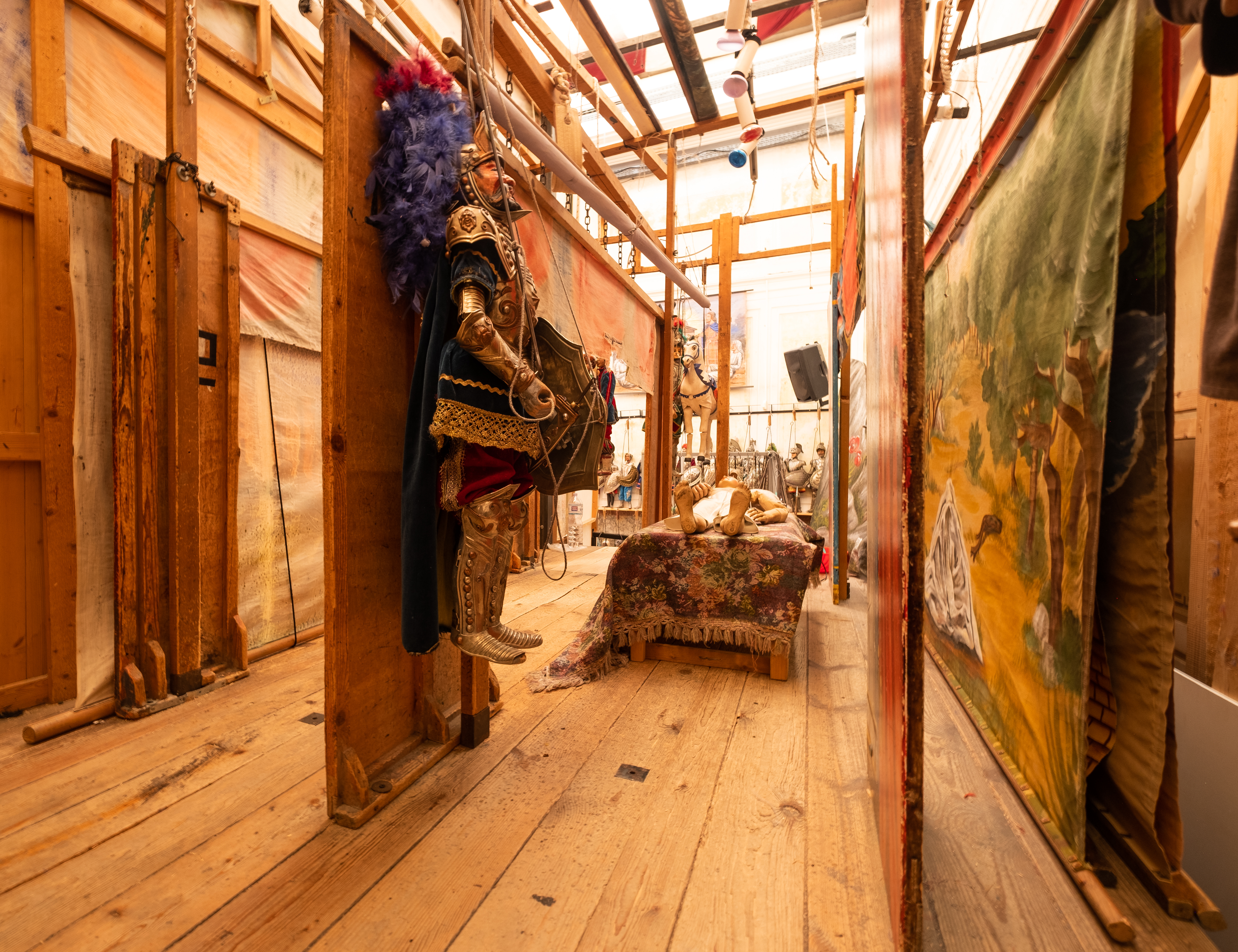

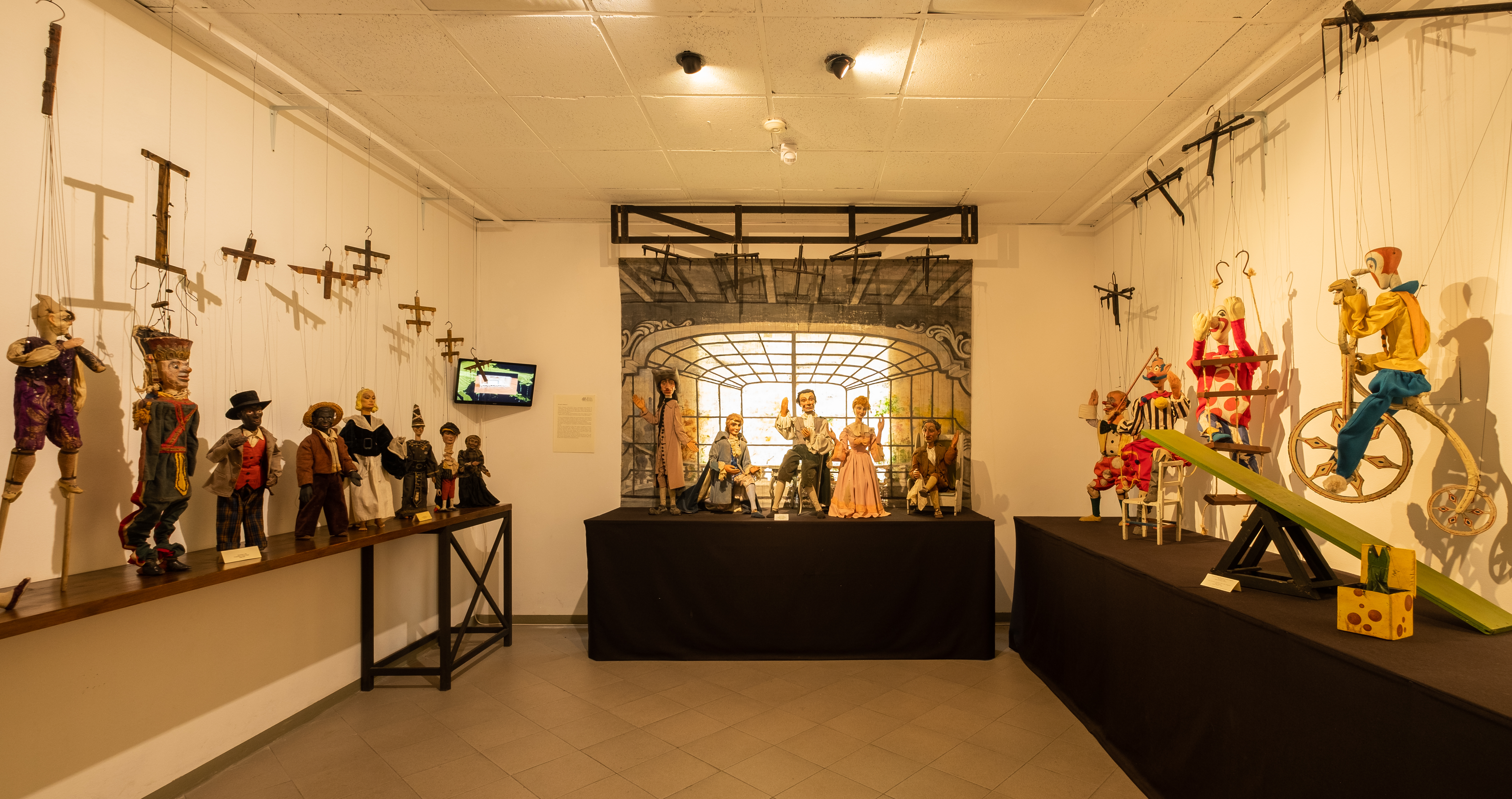

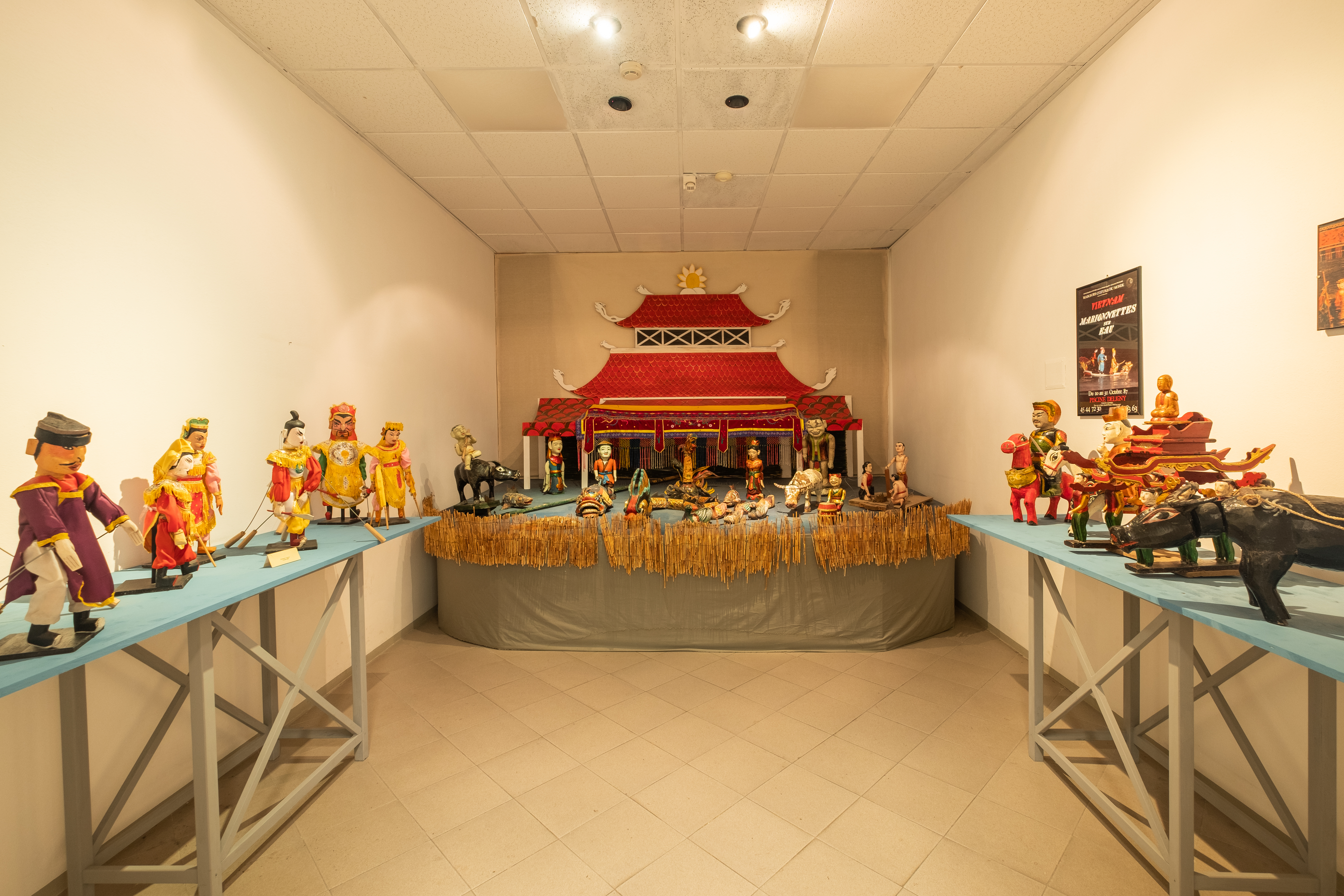

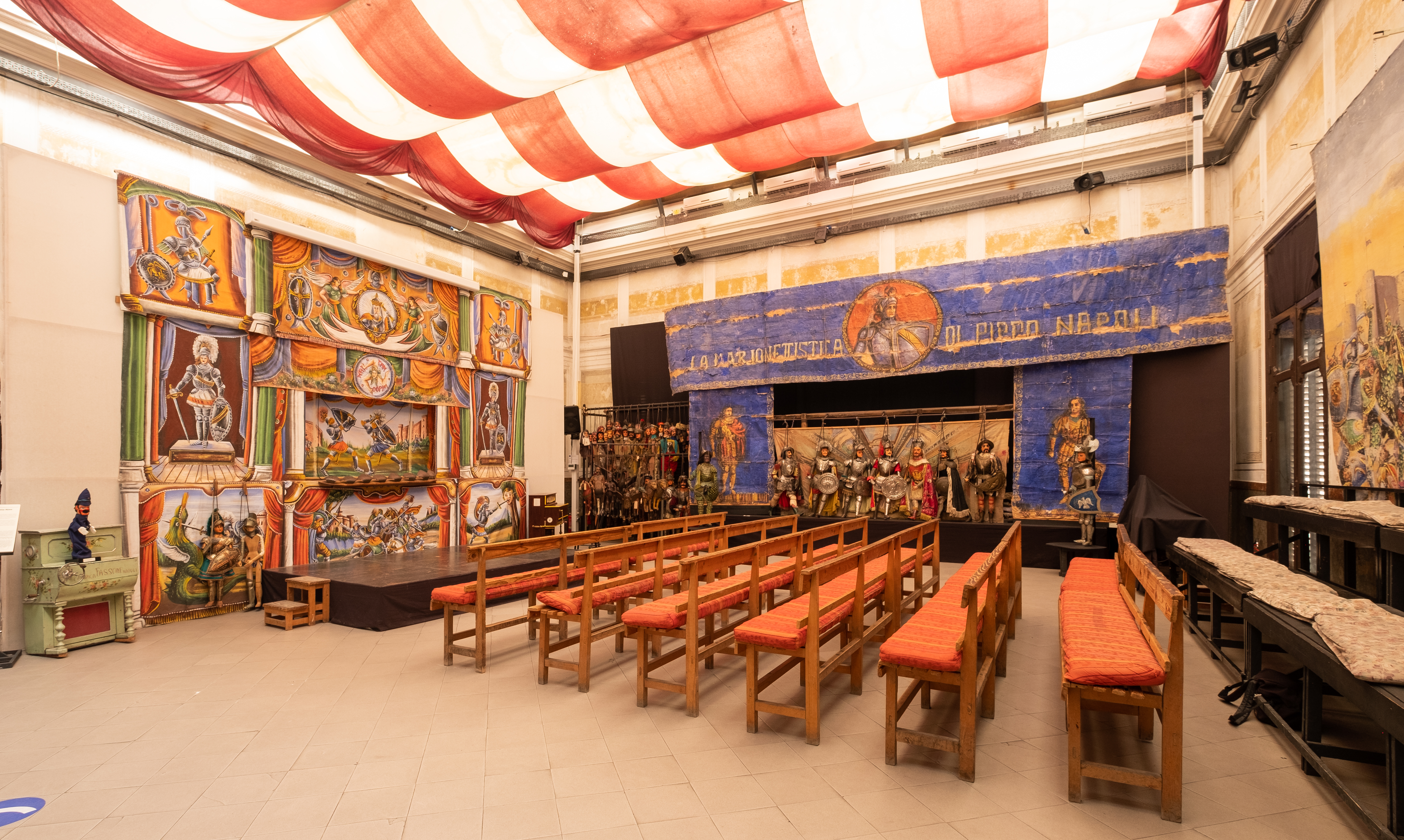

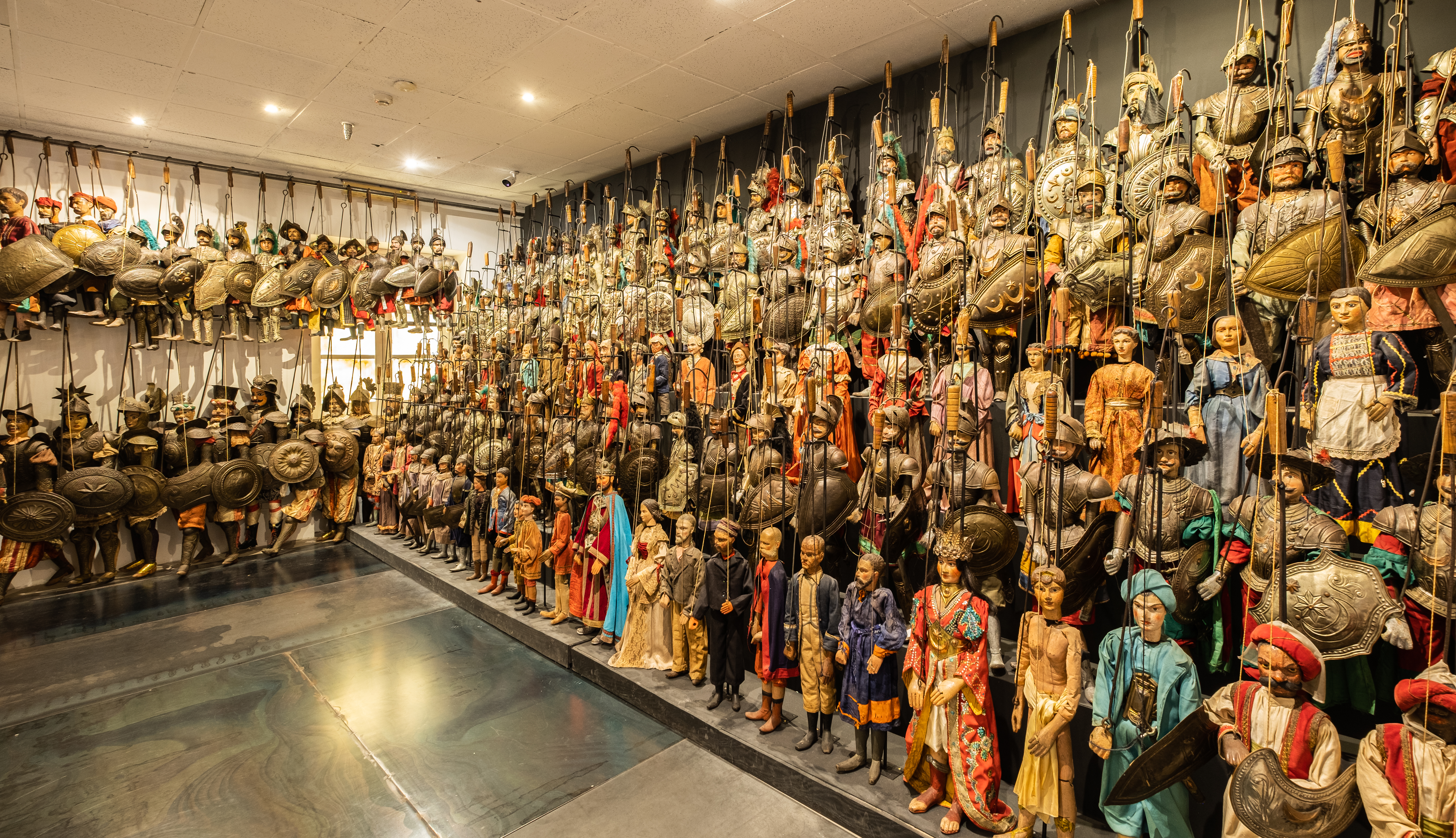

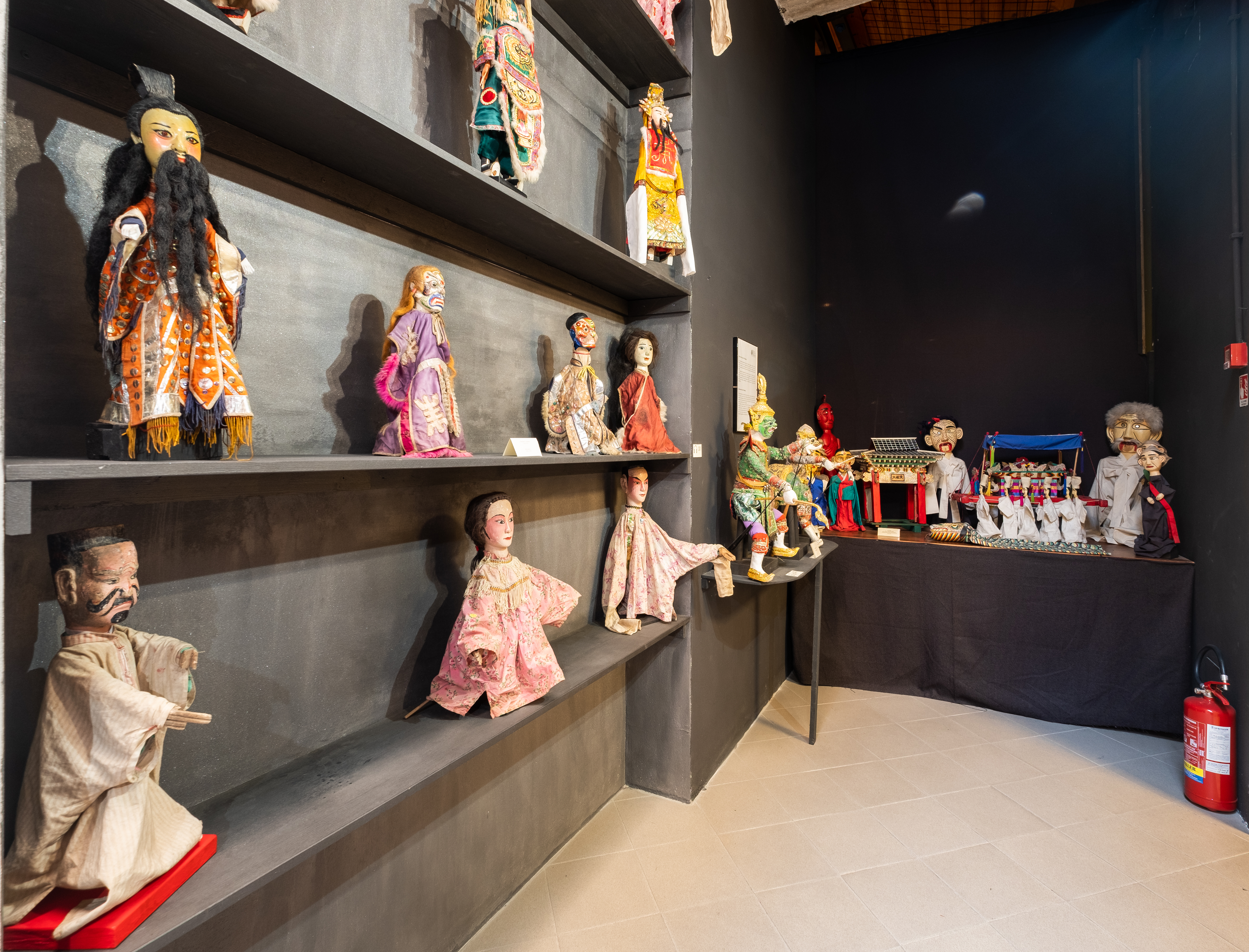

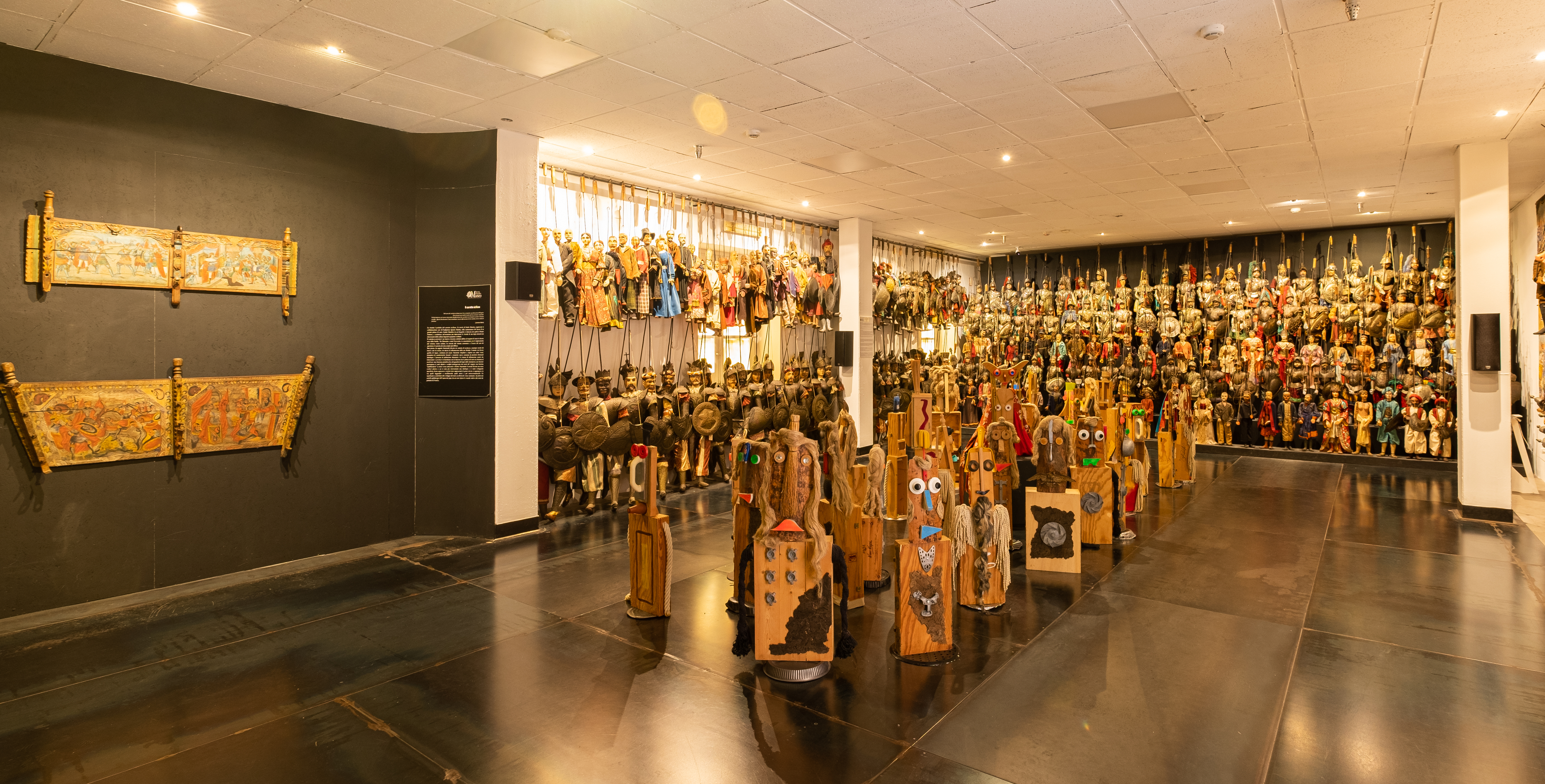

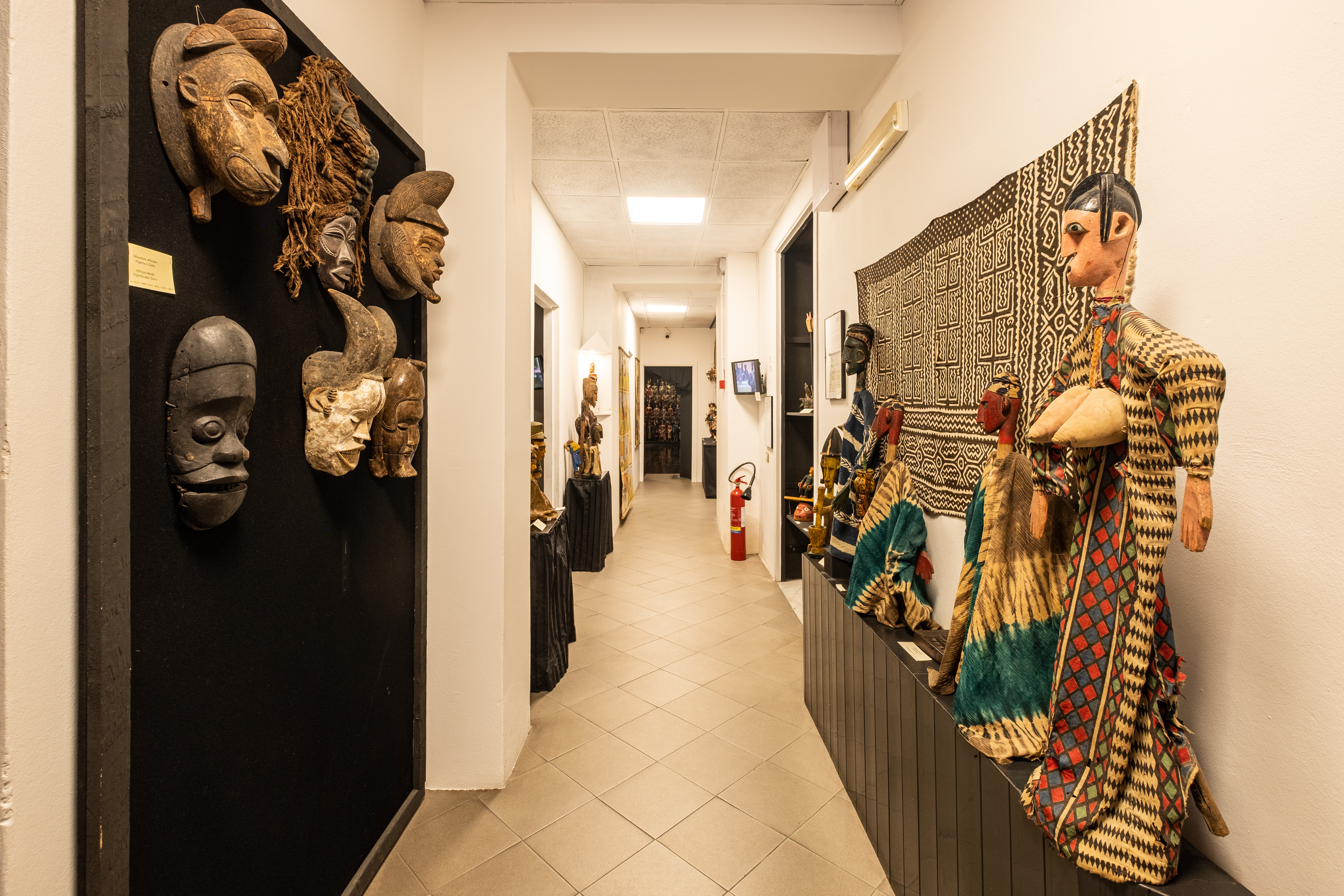

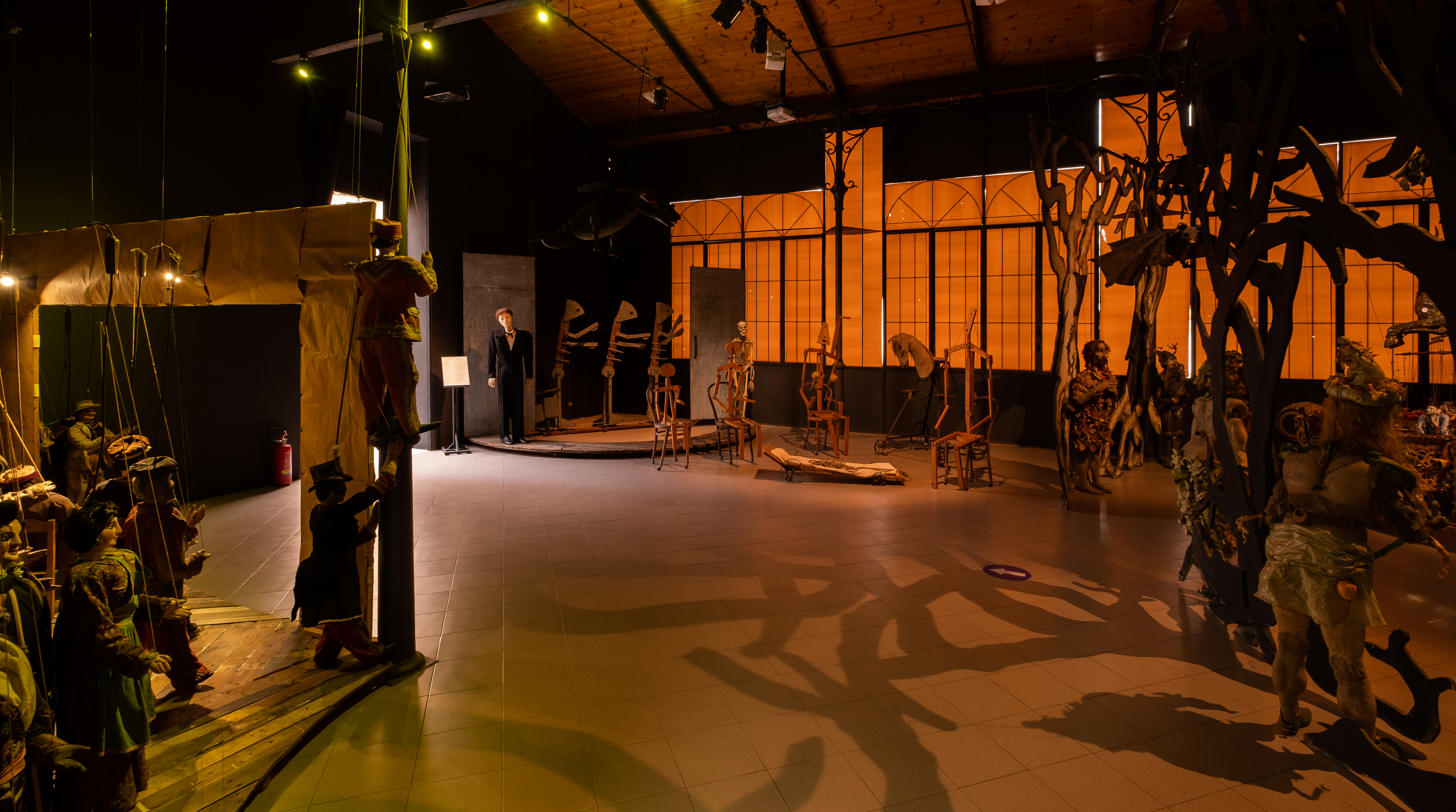

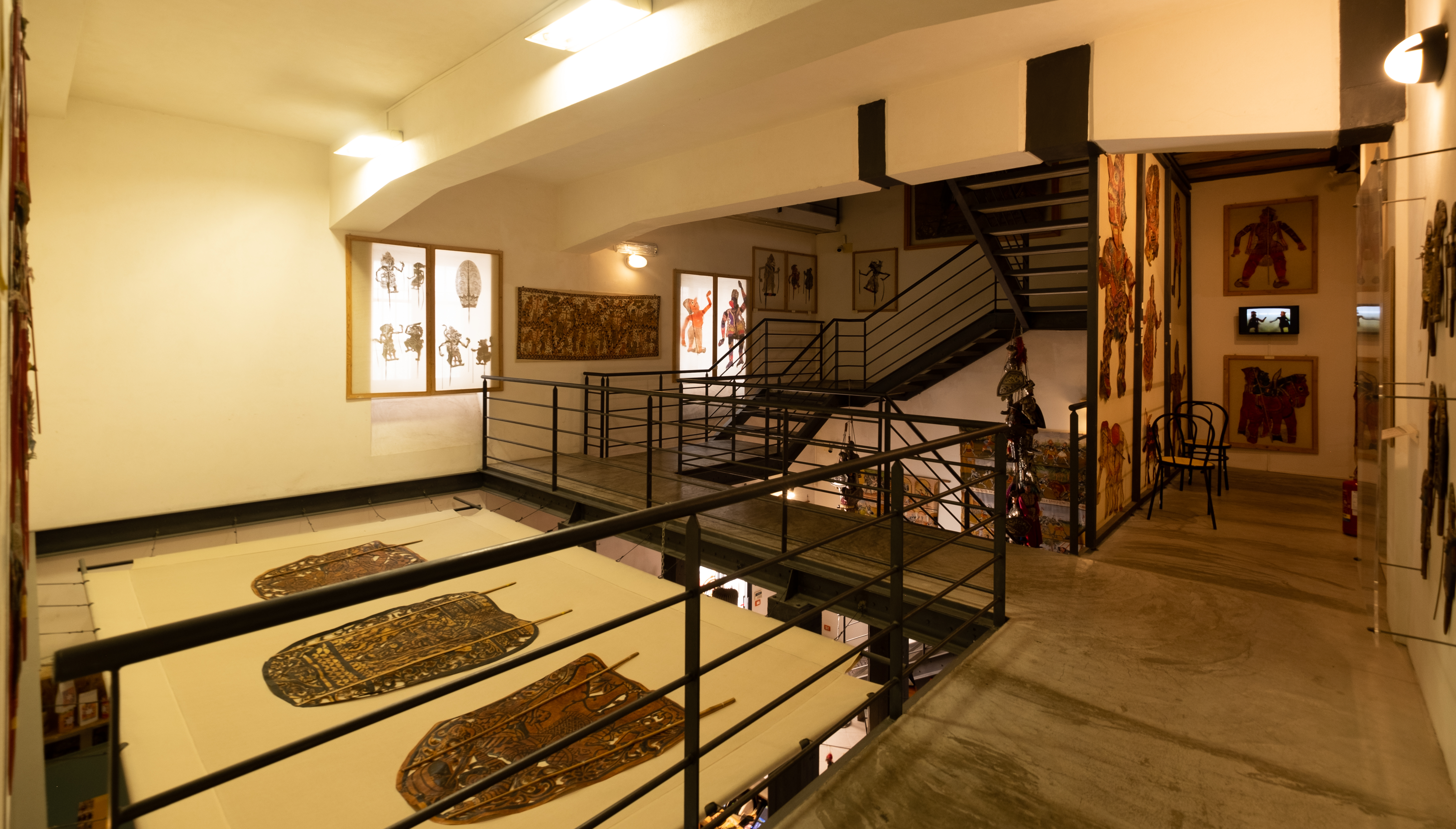

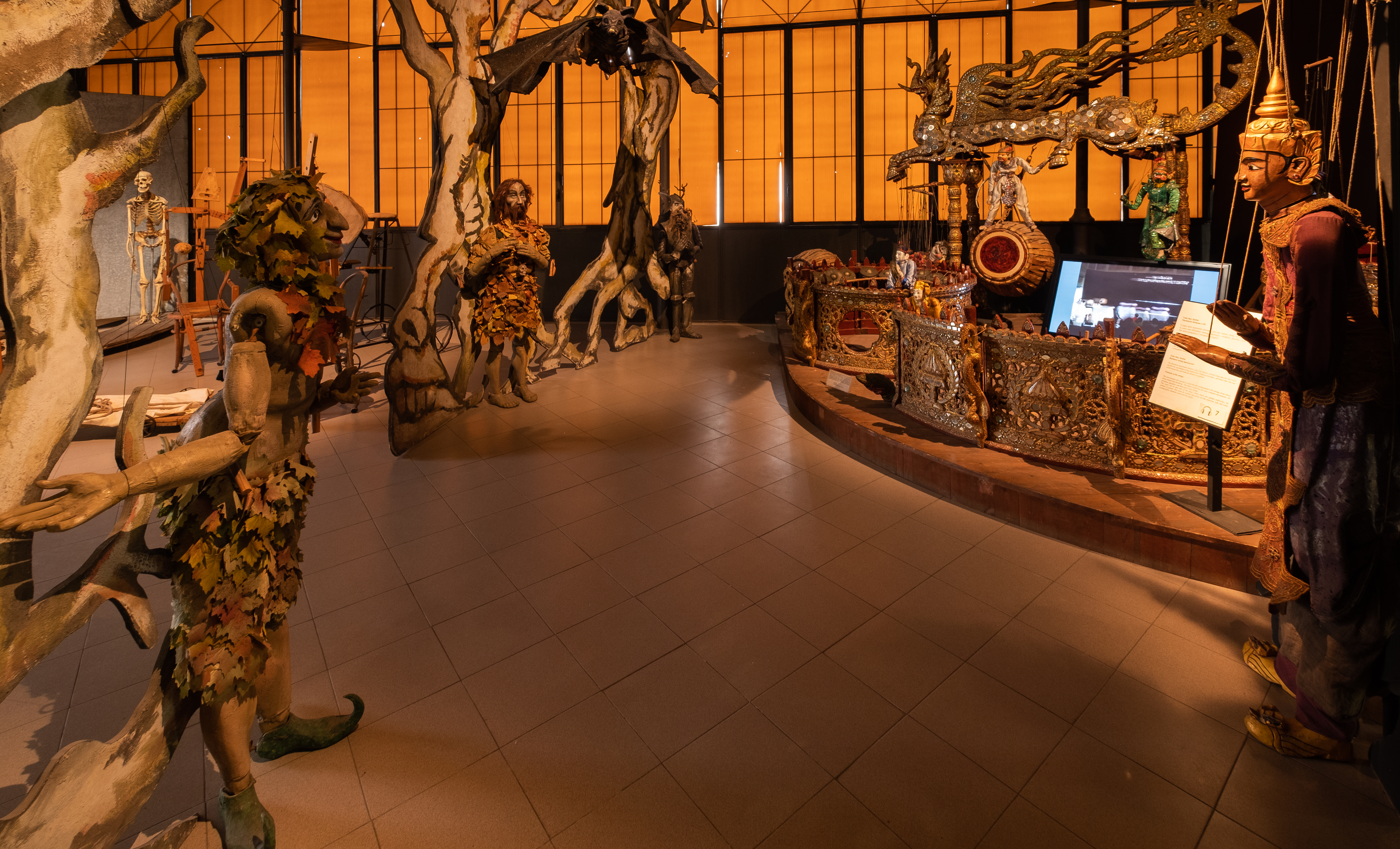

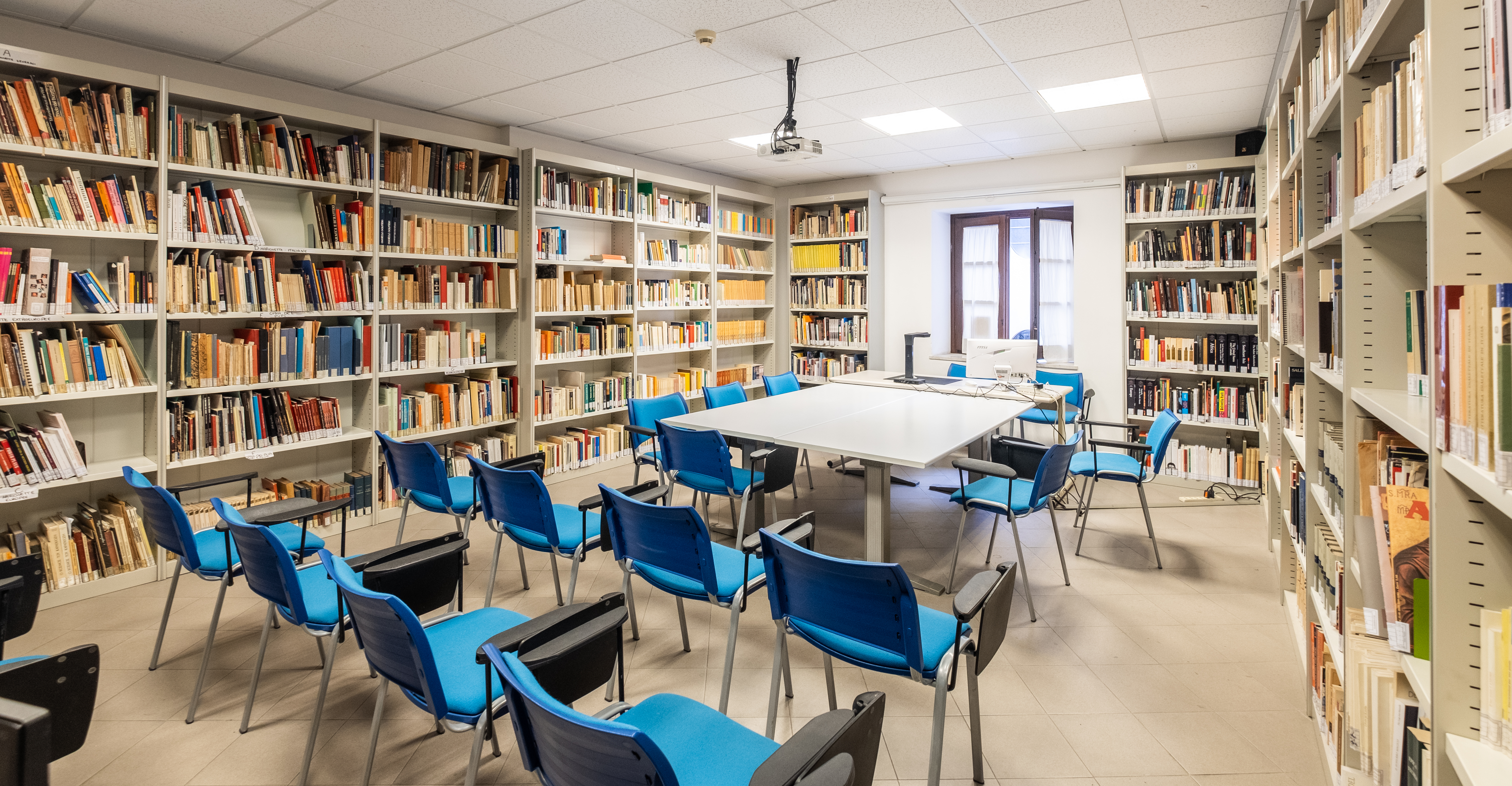

== See also ==
- Opera dei Pupi

== Other projects ==
Wikimedia Commons contains some images or other files on Museo internazionale delle marionette Antonio Pasqualino.
