= Susan Kleinberg =

American artist

Susan Kleinberg (born 1949, Phoenix, Arizona – Died December 1, 2023, Santa Monica, California) was a New York and Los Angeles–based artist. Her work has been exhibited at five Venice Biennales: In 1995, 2001, 2011, 2015 and 2017; as well as at the 2005 Venice Biennale, sponsored by the Istituto Veneto di Scienze, Lettere ed Arti; the 2009 Biennale, sponsored by Telecom Italia; and 2013, sponsored by the Alliance Francaise in Venice.

== Education ==
- B.A. in Art and Philosophy, Pomona College
- M.A. in Art, Hunter College
- Max Beckmann Fellowship, Brooklyn Museum

== Career ==
Kleinberg's early works were displayed at the Castelli Gallery in New York.

Kleinberg traveled to Aurangabad, India in the spring of 1992 at the invitation of the Sarabai family, who have invited artists for many years to live and work there for extended periods of time.

In 1994, she installed a permanent piece in the board room of Human Rights Watch's International Headquarters in New York.

Kleinberg's installation Sposalizio del Mare was included in the 1995 Venice Biennale. The name of the installation references the most important ceremony of the Venetian Republic, the Sposalizio Del Mare: the marriage of the Doge to the sea. The installation was a bright yellow ring based on the Apollo space capsule's flotation collar, which was filled with the golden detritus of Venetian history to the present set afloat in the Grand Canal between San Marco and San Giorgio. It was accompanied by an audio tape of people talking about living in relation to the sea. The piece was ultimately sold to the Province of Lake Como.

In 2002, Kleinberg showed her work at the Museo Nacional de Bellas Artes in Buenos Aires, for the Biennale of Buenos Aires and delivered one of the opening lectures.

In 2003, Kleinberg mounted What Would Make for a Better World, a video installation for the "Future Democracy" exhibition at the Istanbul Biennial. In this piece, she spoke with and photographed what she described as 'the least visible in society' about what would make for a better world. The still photographs were paired with audio and installed throughout the gallery space on monitors mounted on the walls. Hanging from the ceiling were painted Chinese fans with photographs of the people in the piece embedded into them.

BLOOD ROLL was shown first in November 2004 in Seoul, Korea, in a major international show at the Total Museum of Contemporary Art, curated by Young Chul Lee, commissioner of the previous Gwangju Biennale. It was later shown again in 2005 at the Istituto Veneto di Scienze, Lettere ed Arti, being projected across the Campo Santo Stefano onto the facade of the institute.

Kleinberg installed P-SPIN at the Pulkovo Observatory in St. Petersburg, Russia in 2007, in an exhibition organized by Olesya Turkina, a curator from the State Russian Museum.

A major retrospective of Kleinberg's video installations from 2001 to 2017, Equilibrium and Disequilibrium, was shown at the Açıkekran Museum in Istanbul in 2017.

Her 2020 exhibition, Exquisite Vicissitudes, concurrent with Frieze LA, exhibited her series of large chromogenic prints based on the toxic jellyfish population proliferating in the Mediterranean Sea due to global warming.

Her latest video installation piece and related drawings, LEAP!, was inspired by the rumor of dolphins returning to the canals of Venice, Italy in June 2020. LEAP! is currently showing in Venice during the 2022 Biennale at ENDAR.

=== Fear Not (2001) ===
In 2001, Kleinberg created Fear Not for the 2001 Venice Biennale at the American Academy in Rome, where she was a Visiting Artist in Residence. Fear Not was a video installation based on audio interviews about courage, which she conducted with people from many walks of life. Interviewees include artist Chuck Close, President Bill Clinton, Gore Vidal, Albanian refugees, Spalding Gray, film director Sidney Lumet, domestic workers, former U.S. Secretary of State Madeleine Albright, Congressman and civil rights leader John Lewis, Gen. Norman Schwarzkopf, and Evelyn Lauder. Interviews were also conducted in Italian with a similarly broad spectrum of people, from former President Silvio Berlusconi and Susanna Agnelli to fish sellers in the Venetian market. Following the interviews, Ms. Kleinberg photographed or chose photographs of each of the individuals. These were linked to the audio track and installed on monitors, almost as Renaissance portraits, throughout the Arsenale.

There have been numerous exhibitions of Fear Not. It was shown in New York at P.S. 1/MOMA (2001–2002). It was chosen as a Special Project for the Chicago International Art Fair (2002) and was exhibited at the Neuhoff Gallery in New York (May 2002). Ms. Kleinberg showed related paintings and drawings at the Venice Design Gallery, Venice, Italy (2001) and in a preview installation at the Stark Gallery in New York (2001). In 2002 the piece was shown along with related prints at the Tasende Gallery in Los Angeles and the Tasende Gallery in La Jolla, CA, as well as at a benefit and lecture for the Skirball Museum in Los Angeles. Most recently it was part of an international exhibition on the subject of courage at the Fondazione Sandretto Re Rebaudengo in Turin.

=== Tierra Sin Males (2009) ===
Tierra Sin Males is a video piece based on a highway sign near the U.S.-Mexico border warning drivers not to hit immigrants as they flee across the road. It was first shown at the headquarters of Telecom Italia, the Cloister of San Salvador, during the opening of the 2009 Venice Biennale. Kleinberg's accompanying drawings on seaweed paper, paintings, and prints related to the piece, were shown along with the installation in Venice at the Chiostro del Bramante museum in October 2009. Tierra Sin Males was later installed in TRA: EDGE OF BECOMING at the Palazzo Fortuny during the 2011 Venice Biennale.

The 3D version of Tierra Sin Males premiered at Art Basel Miami in 2012, shown at the Regal Theatre in South Beach. It was shown in 2013 at the LOOP Barcelona festival in Antonio Gaudi's Casa Batllo.

Tierra Sin Males also has been shown at MAXXI in Rome, the Buenos Aires Museum of Modern Art MAC in Spain, and the Municipal Museum in Nicosia, Cyprus during 2012–2013. It was shown at the Fondazione Orestiade in Sicily, with a permanent installation at the museum Certosa di Padula. It was shown as part of Sasha Waltz and Guests' ZUHOREN exhibition and conference in Berlin, in July 2016, and in the "We Need to Talk" exhibition at the Petzel Gallery in New York in 2017. In 2019, Tierra Sin Males was shown at the Mexican Consulate in Los Angeles during Frieze LA.

=== Work with the Louvre ===
Kleinberg began what would become a six-year collaboration with the scientific team at the Louvre in 2012. Her first video piece developed with them, KAIROS, features images filmed through the Louvre's high-resolution microscope, including elements and a Mesopotamian figure. It was Kleinberg's fifth high-definition projection piece, along with BLOOD ROLL, D-ROLL, P-SPIN, and Tierra Sin Males, with related prints, drawings, and paintings. It premiered as a work in progress at the Alliance Francaise in Venice for the opening of the 2013 Venice Biennale. It was later shown in PROPORTIO at the Palazzo Fortuny for the 2015 Venice Biennale. It was also shown in Cyfest at the Research Museum of the Russian Academy of Arts in St. Petersburg, Russia, in 2017.

Kleinberg's second collaboration with the scientific team of the Louvre, BALAFRE, premiered in INTUITION at the Palazzo Fortuny in Venice for the 2017 Venice Biennale.

Her third collaboration, HELIX, premiered in April 2018, at the Antonio Pasqualino International Puppet Museum in Palermo, Italy, coinciding with Manifesta 18. HELIX was later shown at the Venice Biennale 2019. During the summer of 2021, high-resolution images from HELIX were shown on monitors throughout the Milan metro system.
