= Advanced LIGO Documentary Project =

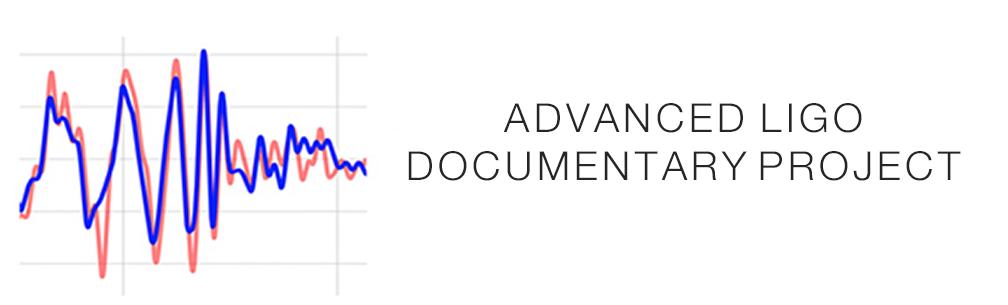

The Advanced LIGO Documentary Project is a collaboration formed in the summer of 2015 among Caltech, the Massachusetts Institute of Technology and Director Les Guthman to make the definitive documentary about the Advanced LIGO project's search for, and expected first detection of, gravitational waves; and to record a longitudinal video archive of the project for future researchers and historians. The feature documentary, "LIGO," was released in the spring of 2019. Mr. Guthman also wrote, produced and directed an eight-part video series on YouTube, LIGO: A DISCOVERY THAT SHOOK THE WORLD, which was released over three years, 2017–2020. The video series remains in production with three more episodes covering the LIGO project's third science run 2019–2020.

== Nobel Prize ==
On October 3, 2017, Rainer Weiss, Kip Thorne and Barry Barish won the Nobel Prize in Physics for LIGO's historic first observation of gravitational waves in September 2015.

== History ==
On September 14, 2015, the Advanced LIGO Documentary team was on location filming at the LIGO Livingston Observatory when the detection was made. Over the next five months, it had exclusive media access to document the long, careful process of scientific verification that was conducted by the LIGO Scientific Collaboration to confirm that the received signal was in fact a gravitational wave, as predicted by Albert Einstein more than 100 years ago.

The detection was announced by LIGO at the National Press Club in Washington DC on February 11, 2016.

In addition to its filming of the secret internal confirmation months of the gravitational wave detection and LIGO's continuing breakthrough science, the Advanced LIGO Documentary Project filmed LIGO's Nobel Prize week in Stockholm; three important post-detection lectures by Thorne, Barish and LIGO astrophysicist Alessandra Buonanno. It also filmed the LIGO Scientific Collaboration semi-annual meeting at CERN two weeks after its August 2017 detection of two colliding neutron stars, which launched the new age of multi-messenger astronomy and lead LIGO astrophysicist Daniel Holz to tell the New York Times, "I can't think of a similar situation in the field of science in my lifetime, where a single event provides so many staggering insights about our universe.”

== Productions ==
In June 2016, the Advanced LIGO Documentary Project produced the two LIGO programs at the World Science Festival in New York, including the main stage panel moderated by theoretical physicist and best-selling author Brian Greene, featuring five of the key physicists behind the historic detection, including Rai Weiss and Barry Barish, and four short videos from the Project's exclusive footage inside the discovery. The program streams on YouTube and as of June 2020 has been viewed more than 2.2 million times, making it the third-most viewed full-length program in the World Science Festival's 13 years of streaming.

In the fall of 2016, the Advanced LIGO Documentary Project received a two-year grant from the National Science Foundation to continue its filming of the LIGO project, now with a focus on the new era of gravitational-wave astronomy ushered in by the historic detection of GW150914. In early 2017, MathWorks joined as sponsoring partner.

The first video of A DISCOVERY THAT SHOOK THE WORLD, produced under the NSF grant, was released in spring 2017: "Mirrors That Hang on Glass Threads". The second episode, "The New Age of Gravitational Wave Astronomy", was released in summer 2017. Episode 3, "GW170817: So Many Astonishing Insights About Our Universe", was released in February 2018. The remaining five episodes were released in 2019. Episodes 10, 11 and 12, produced with the support of MathWorks, has been delayed by the pandemic and will be released in 2021.

The channel of Advanced LIGO Documentary Project has more than 30K views on YouTube, which ranks among the top 1 percent in the category of scientific education. In addition to streaming on YouTube, the video series streams on all five LIGO websites, at Caltech, MIT, the LIGO Scientific Collaboration, the LIGO Hanford Observatory and the LIGO Livingston Observatory, and on the Advanced LIGO Documentary Project's Vimeo Site, where it has another 25K views. The series on this site includes a ninth episode bringing together all eight short a-LIGO SNAP profiles at the end of the first eight episodes. The series also will soon be distributed online by the National Science Foundation's Science Zone educational network.

== Book ==
On September 5, 2020, the fifth anniversary of LIGO's historic discovery, Les Guthman published a book based on the video series, with the same title, LIGO: A Discovery That Shook the World.
