= Corwin (film) =

- Directed by: Les Guthman
- Written by: Les Guthman
- Produced by: Les Guthman
- Cinematography: Harry Dawson; Richard Rutkowski
- Edited by: Marco Ruggio; Tom Siiter
- Release date: June 14, 1996 (USA)
- Running time: 80 minutes
- Country: United States
- Language: English

Corwin is a feature-length documentary by director Les Guthman on Norman Corwin, writer, director and producer during the Golden Age of Radio. Corwin aired on PBS during the 1990s. Actor Charles Laughton said of Corwin, "There is no actor in Hollywood or on Broadway, who would not drop what he is doing to be in one of Norman Corwin's radio plays."
