= LIGO (film) =

American 2019 documentary film

- Directed by: Les Guthman
- Written by: Les Guthman
- Produced by: Susan Kleinberg; Christine Steele; Les Guthman
- Narrated by: Les Guthman
- Cinematography: John Armstrong
- Edited by: Les Guthman
- Production companies: XPLR Productions, Advanced LIGO Documentary Project
- Release date: 2019
- Country: United States
- Language: English

LIGO is a 2019 American documentary film that tells the inside account of the discovery by the international LIGO Scientific Collaboration of the first observation of gravitational waves in September 2015, a discovery that led two years later to the Nobel Prize in Physics for LIGO physicists Rai Weiss, Kip Thorne and Barry Barish. In December 2019, National Geographic named the LIGO detections at the top of its list of "The 20 Top Scientific Discoveries of the Decade".

== Production ==
LIGO was written, directed and edited by Les Guthman. It was produced by the Advanced LIGO Documentary Project and XPLR Productions in a collaboration with the LIGO Scientific Collaboration, Caltech and MIT, and financed by a grant from U.S. National Science Foundation and support from MathWorks, Caltech and MIT.

Production on the documentary began in August 2015. Three weeks later, Guthman was on location with his crew at the LIGO Livingston Observatory near Baton Rouge, Louisiana when the historic detection, which was not expected for another year, was made. Production documented LIGO's secret months-long intensive examination of the detection, before it was announced that the National Press Club in Washington, D.C., in February 2016; and production continued, along with script development, through 2016 and 2017.

In August 2017, as the film was about to go into post-production, LIGO made a second major discovery, GW170817, and then in October the Nobel Prize was announced. The script for LIGO was adjusted, requiring additional photography, and its last shoot was with Weiss, Thorne and Barish in Stockholm, along with more than 50 of their colleagues in December 2017.

== Synopsis ==
The film begins as Guthman did, arriving innocently at the LIGO Livingston Observatory in September 2015 and then getting swept up in a compelling scientific experience. The discovery of the first gravitational wave capped a 50-year, $1 billion search for the detection and measurement of microscopic warps in spacetime, predicted by Albert Einstein a century earlier. It was the dramatic and emotional peak in the lives of the 1,000 scientists around the world who had risked their careers on a discovery Einstein himself had thought impossible: detecting the billion-year-old waves—far smaller than the size of a proton—over a length of several thousand kilometers.

The documentary is divided into six chapters which chronicle the phases of the LIGO discoveries:

1. Warped space – The detection of GW150914
2. What's out there – The four-month interlude when LIGO kept the discovery secret as they confirmed the detection beyond all doubt and wrestled with its apparent truth
3. Inventing LIGO – The discovery announcement in February 2016 at an international media event
4. The universe gets 50 times brighter – A year of emotional letdown and unexpected technical crises at LIGO's two observatories
5. Hearing the universe – The second, unexpected detection of two colliding neutron stars, GW170817, and its history-making multimessenger results from 70 observatories and space-based cameras around the world
6. Stockholm – Nobel Prize week in Stockholm

== Awards ==
The film was completed in May 2019 and was the Official Selection of 22 film festivals. It won the Best Documentary award twice, at the 2020 Solaris Film Festival in Vienna, Austria and the 2021 Sigma Xi STEM Film Festival.
