= Opera dei Pupi =

Typical sicilian marionette theatre

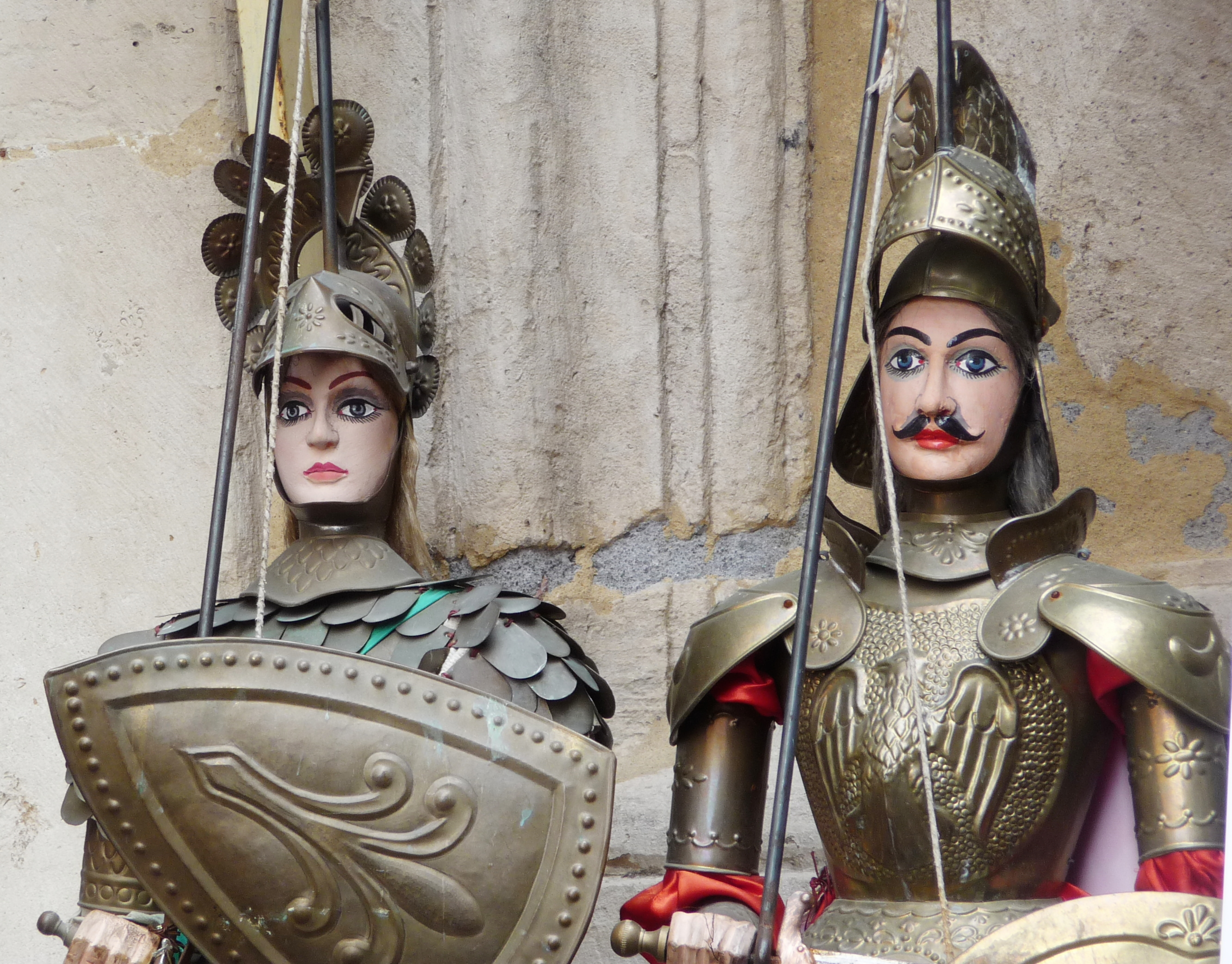
- Pupi marionettes in Catania
- Medium: Marionette theatre
- Originating culture: Sicilian

Opera dei Pupi, Sicilian puppet theatre
- UNESCO Intangible Cultural Heritage
- Country: Italy
- Reference: 00011
- Region: Europe and North America

Inscription history
- Inscription: 2008 (3rd session)
- List: Representative

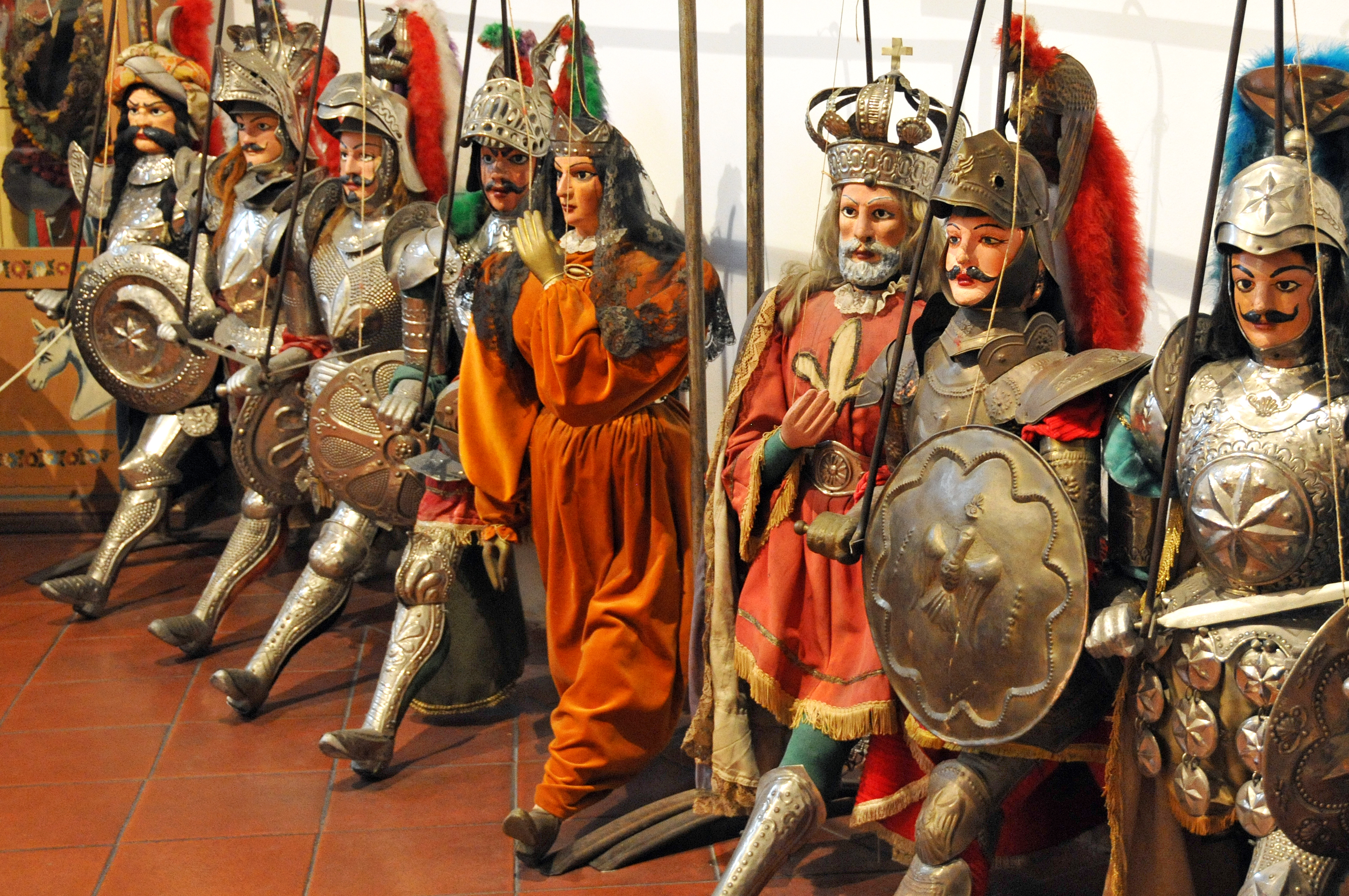
Pupi marionettes

The Opera dei Pupi (Sicilian: opra î pupi in Palermo, Sicilian: opira î pupi in Catania; "Opera of the Puppets") is a marionette theatrical representation of Frankish romantic poems traditionally performed in Sicily, Italy.

Inscribed in the UNESCO's List of the Oral and Intangible Heritage of Humanity in 2008, it dates back to the third decade of the nineteenth century, and was particularly successful among the middle and lower classes, becoming one of Sicily's most significant expressions of history and cultural identity.

The puppeteers (named pupari) animate the puppets to represent episodes of serialized stories derived from epic-chivalric literature of medieval origin, with particular reference to the Carolingian cycle; and in a more limited manner, from the Arthurian novels. All these stories were elaborated in The History of the Paladins of France, written by Giusto Lo Dico, that is a "compilation of the Italian chivalric poems of the Renaissance in which the French literature of the Middle Ages was freely modified". Published in handouts since 1858, the work written in prose brings together and re-elaborates the poems of cultured literature such as Orlando innamorato, Orlando Furioso and Gerusalemme Liberata.

The traditional repertoire of the shows also include historical-romantic narratives, stories of brigands, works by William Shakespeare such as Romeo and Juliette and Macbeth, and short farces.

== History ==
It is difficult to establish when and where the Opera dei Pupi was born. "The chronicles say that the initiators of the Opera in Palermo were Don Gaetano Greco (1813–1874) and Don Liberato Canino, while in Catania they were Don Gaetano Crimi (1807–1877) and his antagonist Giovanni Grasso (1792–1863)". The so-called pupi in page (that is, without armor) certainly preceded the armored ones and were used to represent Sicilian tales and farces, which are still performed today. Studies also show that from the 16th century, shows of chivalry were staged with puppets throughout Europe; and in the 18th century such shows also took place in Sicily and Naples (being represented in the theater of Giuseppina d'Errico also known as "Donna Peppa").

However, only in the first decades of the nineteenth century, in Sicily, did the chivalrous repertoire achieve such resounding success as to supplant all the others and determine a series of technical and figurative innovations.

This was probably due to the delayed effect of the pre-romantic and romantic style of the Middle Ages; but it is also a consequence of ingenious technical inventions which made it possible to give extraordinary effectiveness to combat scenes which become a sort of exalting dance, with a crescendo rhythm and which arouses an intense psychomotory participation in the audience.

There are numerous studies dedicated to Sicilian Opera dei pupi. The most recent research by Ignazio E. Buttitta, Bernadette Majorana, Alessandro Napoli and Rosario Perricone followed the historically fundamental contributions of Antonino Buttitta, Antonino Uccello, Janne Vibaek, and Carmelo Alberti. Furthermore, we cannot fail to mention the fundamental studies of Giuseppe Pitrè and Sebastiano Lo Nigro as well as the book entitled Opera dei pupi by Antonio Pasqualino (Sellerio 1977). Narrations and memories of the puppeteers themselves can also be added to this short list.

Over time, the Opera dei pupi has gone through some periods of serious crisis: Giuseppe Pitrè recorded its decline at the end of the nineteenth century; a new crisis dates back to the 1930s and was due to the spread of cinema; the most recent one, and even more incisive, is that of the Fifties and Sixties when the popular neighborhoods of the cities began to empty and to reject traditional culture began to be rejected following the spread of new forms of economic well-being of the consumerist era. Despite these difficult periods, the Opera dei pupi is still practiced today by various companies of the Island, companies which haver an ancient or more recent history and attract new audiences, showing a renewed vitality.

The proclamation of the Opera dei pupi as a UNESCO "Masterpiece of the oral and intangible heritage of humanity" in 2001, upon a candidacy supported by the Association for the conservation of popular traditions, has greatly contributed to relaunching the attention on Sicilian traditional puppet theater. Being the first Italian practice to obtain this important recognition, in 2008, it was registered in the Representative List of the intangible cultural heritage of humanity, following the Italian ratification of the Convention for the Safeguarding of the Intangible Cultural Heritage of 2003.

== The puppet and the puppeteer: general characteristics ==
Equipped with a wooden frame, the puppets are provided with real armor, richly decorated and chiseled, and vary in movement according to the "school" they belong to: Palermo, Catania or Naples. They differ in some mechanical and figurative aspects and at times among different individual subjects.

In general, the frame is composed of a wooden torso, which the legs are connected to, allowing for a pendular movement. The pupi are maneuvered using threads and metal rods. The so-called main rod, where the threads are attached to in order to control the limbs, passes through the center of the head and connects it to the torso. The upper end of the rod is hooked, allowing the marionette to be temporarily suspended, even during the play; and inclining the rod permits the marionette to be moved.

From a figurative point of view, one can generically distinguish the characters with armor (armed) from those without (in page). The armor and costumes of the puppets respond to a complex iconographic code and adhere to the nineteenth-century romantic fashion of representing the Middle Ages.

Among the armed characters, the Christian and Saracen heroes can be distinguished. Christian warriors have kind faces and symmetrical features, wear a kilt (called faroncina in Palermo and vesti in Catania) and present their family's respective emblems on their helmets, chestplates and shields allowing the audience to recognize the characters. The Saracens have more marked facial features; they often wear trousers and turbans, and their armor is decorated with half moons and stars. Among the page characters, the more comical characters stand out: in Catania the best known is Peppininu, who acts as a squire for Roland and Renaud; in Palermo, Nofrio and Virticchio perform in farces, with a licentious and funny tone, which often closed the performance. Farces date back to the vastasate, comic representations derived from the Commedia dell'arte.

The puppeteer – also known as "oprante", "teatrinaro" and, in Naples, "pupante" – manages the theater, is the director of the show and animates the puppets, giving suggestions, ardor and pathos to the epic scenes represented. He paints the scenes and advertising posters, and sometimes even builds the puppets.

Puppeteers preserve a rich tradition of stories, performance techniques, and construction methods passed down orally from teacher to student.

To promote the shows, advertising posters (cartelli) were displayed outside the theaters; today they are used to decorate the walls of theaters. Painted in bright colors, they represent the different episodes of the Carolingian cycle and would inform the public at what point the narrative the puppeteer had arrived.

Puppets, cartelli, scenes and props, are part of the so called mestiere of the company, which is the set of objects necessary for the staging of the show

== Transmission of the heritage ==
The puppeteers, who make up the heritage community of the Opera dei Pupi, are the custodians of a vast and complex heritage that is still transmitted orally from teacher to apprentice, both within the family and outside. It is a heritage that includes the stories represented and the modes of representation, the performative codes (e.g. sound code, kinesic code, etc.), as well as the techniques of construction of the puppets and how to paint the scenes and posters. The transmission of this heritage takes place within the companies and craft workshops primarily through the listening and observation of the master by the young apprentice.

In the traditional context, the transmission of this intangible heritage was facilitated by the daily enjoyment of the evening show. By going to the theater evening by evening, one could listen to and watch the stories represented. Observing the masters at work every day thus ensured a successful generational change and the transmission of knowledge.

Although the crisis of the middle 19th century caused a significant irregularity of the shows (no longer being represented daily), even today the transmission of this heritage takes place according to traditional methods. To strengthen the process of transmitting the living heritage of the Sicilian Opera dei Pupi and to respond effectively to the challenges of the new millennium, in 2018 the puppet companies gathered in the "Italian Network of Organizations for the Protection, Promotion, and Enhancement of the Opera dei Pupi".

== The characters ==
Among the main characters of the chivalrous epic of the opera dei pupi are the paladins in the service of Emperor Charlemagne, Princess Angelica, some Saracens (enemies of the paladins), and Gano the traitor:

- Count Roland
- Renaud
- Ruggero
- Ferragut
- Angelica
- Ganelon

== The Opera dei Pupi in Sicily ==
Recognized in 2001 by Unesco as a Masterpiece of the Oral and Intangible Heritage of humanity, the Sicilian Opera dei Pupi has two different variants: that of Palermo, in western Sicily, and that of Catania, in eastern Sicily.

=== The Opera dei Pupi of Catania ===
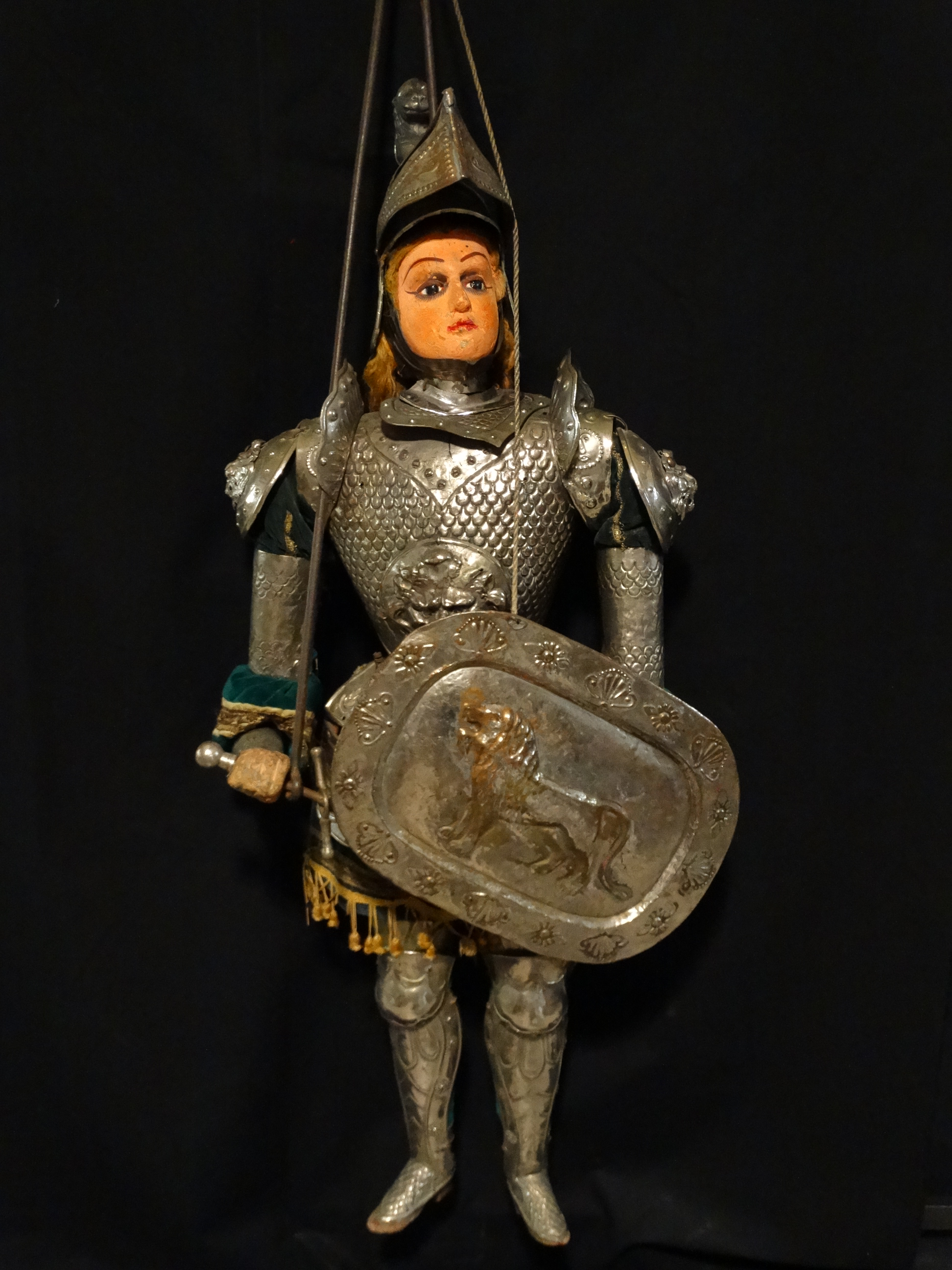
Pupo from Catania, Tigreleone. Marionettistica Fratelli Napoli's collection, at the Antonio Pasqualino International Puppet Museum, Palermo

The "Catania'' style of the Opera dei Pupi characterizes eastern Sicily, in particular the provinces of Catania, Messina and Syracuse. The skeleton of the Catania puppets has padding that helps make the puppets heavier. Their height is usually between 110 and 130 cm, and they can reach a weight of about 30 kilos. If they are warriors, they almost always hold their sword in their right hand due to the absence of the wire that, in Palermo puppets, connects the handle to the sword hilt. The non-articulated legs allow the considerable weight of the puppets to be unloaded on the stage without risking that the legs bend and they also facilitate the maneuver performed by the handlers (Sicilian: manianti). They operate from a raised bridge (Sicilian: scannappoggiu), positioned behind the backdrop and this position determines the reduced depth of the stage to the advantage of a greater width. From behind the backdrop, some speakers (Sicilian: parraturi/parlatrice) improvise dramatic dialogues or read the different parts from a stretched script, respectively of the male and female characters.

The direction is usually entrusted to one of the speakers who gives instructions to the manianti.

In Catania, the repertoire also included: Erminio della Stella d'Oro, Guido of Santa Croce, Uzeta the Catanese, Farismane and Siface, Tramoro of Medina and Guelfo of Negroponte. In addition to these one could also find the Belisario of Messina, a story represented in Messina, "which marks a specific peculiarity of the city of the strait compared to the Catania tradition of the Opera dei Pupi.

In the Opera dei Pupi of Catania, the show was accompanied by music played by an orchestra that included plectrum instruments and, sometimes, an accordion and some wind instruments. Today, it is common for productions to use recorded music.

In Catania, the cartelli are painted in tempera on wrapping paper and depict the most important scene of the evening episode. A removable sheet showing the salient features of the story (Sicilian: ricordino) was pinned to the sign.

==== The variants of Acireale and Siracusa ====
Stylistic variants of the Catania tradition include that of Acireale and of Syracuse.

In Acireale, there is a different maneuvering system according to which the puppets are manipulated from a bridge higher than the proscenium and placed in front of the backdrop. Even the puppets have some differences: they are smaller in size and the main and right arm maneuvers are very long both having a hook at the upper end. In Acireale, as in Palermo, the speaker lends his voice to represent both male and female characters.

«In Syracuse, in the historic theaters of the Puzzo family, the puppets, in size, weight, maneuvering system and repertoire are all similar to those of Catania; however, they have legs with a joint at the knee».

==== The heritage community ====
«Currently there are five families of puppeteers in eastern Sicily who are the custodians of the oral and intangible heritage of the opera dei pupi as well as of material goods (puppets, signs, scenes, scenic equipment, etc.). This includes both historical material and that which is used for the realization of the shows»^{:}

1. Fiorenzo Napoli's "Marionettistica Fratelli Napoli" [Marionette Theatre Company "Napoli Brothers"] (Catania)
2. Association "Opera dei Pupi Turi Grasso" (Messina)
3. Cultural Association "Opera dei Pupi Messinesi Gargano" (Siracusa):
4. The family Vaccaro-Mauceri" (Syracuse):
5. Puglisi Family's Ancient Opera dei Pupi Company (Sortino)

=== The Opera dei Pupi of Palermo ===
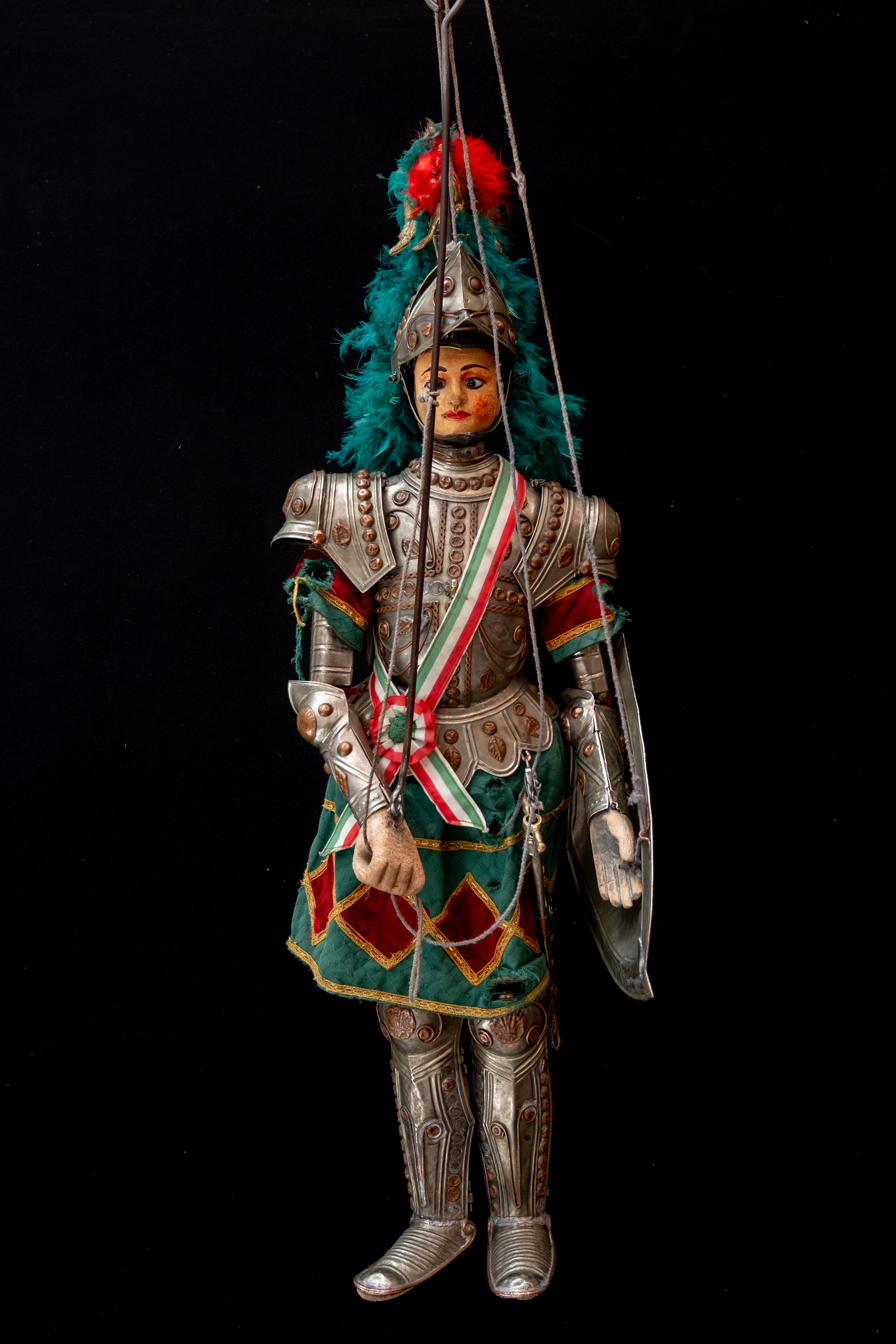
Pupo from Palermo, Orlando. Collection of the Company Brigliadoro, Palermo

The "Palermo" style of the opera dei pupi characterizes western Sicily and in particular the provinces of Palermo, Agrigento and Trapani. Palermo's puppets are about 90 cm high and weigh between 5 and 10 kilos. The legs can perform a pendular movement, have articulated knees and can draw and place the sword in its scabbard thanks to a wire that crosses the right hand and connects the maneuvering iron to the sword hilt.

In Palermo, the puppeteers arrange themselves on the sides of the stage (for this reason the theater is deeper than it is wide) and, hidden by the side wings, operate on the same level as the puppets by extending their arms. The master puppeteer is located in the right wings (the left of the spectators), directing the show, operating the puppets, improvising the dialogues by lending his voice to all the characters (even female) and creating the sound and light effects.

The show was accompanied by the music of one or more violins which, at the end of the 19th century, were replaced by the barrel organ, still used today.

The cartelli from Palermo, painted in tempera on canvas, are divided into different squares, usually eight, resembling a chessboard. Each square, often subtitled, corresponds to one of the episodes of the long Carolingian cycle. A sheet bearing the words "Today" was attached to the square relating to the evening show, indicating at what point in the cycle they had arrived.

The heritage community

"Currently there are eight companies of puppeteers of Palermo who are depositories of the oral and intangible heritage of the opera dei pupi as well as of theatrical props (puppets, signs, sets, tools, etc.). This includes both historical material and that which is used for the realization of the shows":

Palermo:

- Vincenzo Argento's Agramante Cultural Association
- The "Franco Cuticchio" Cultural Association
- Angelo Sicilia's Marionettistica Popolare Siciliana Cultural Association
- Vincenzo Mancuso's Charlamagne Theatrical Cultural Association
- Cuticchio Figli d'Arte Association
- Girolamo Cuticchio's TeatroArte Cuticchio Company

Alcamo:

- The "Gaspare Canino" Opera dei Pupi Cultural Association

== Subsequent diffusion of the puppet opera ==
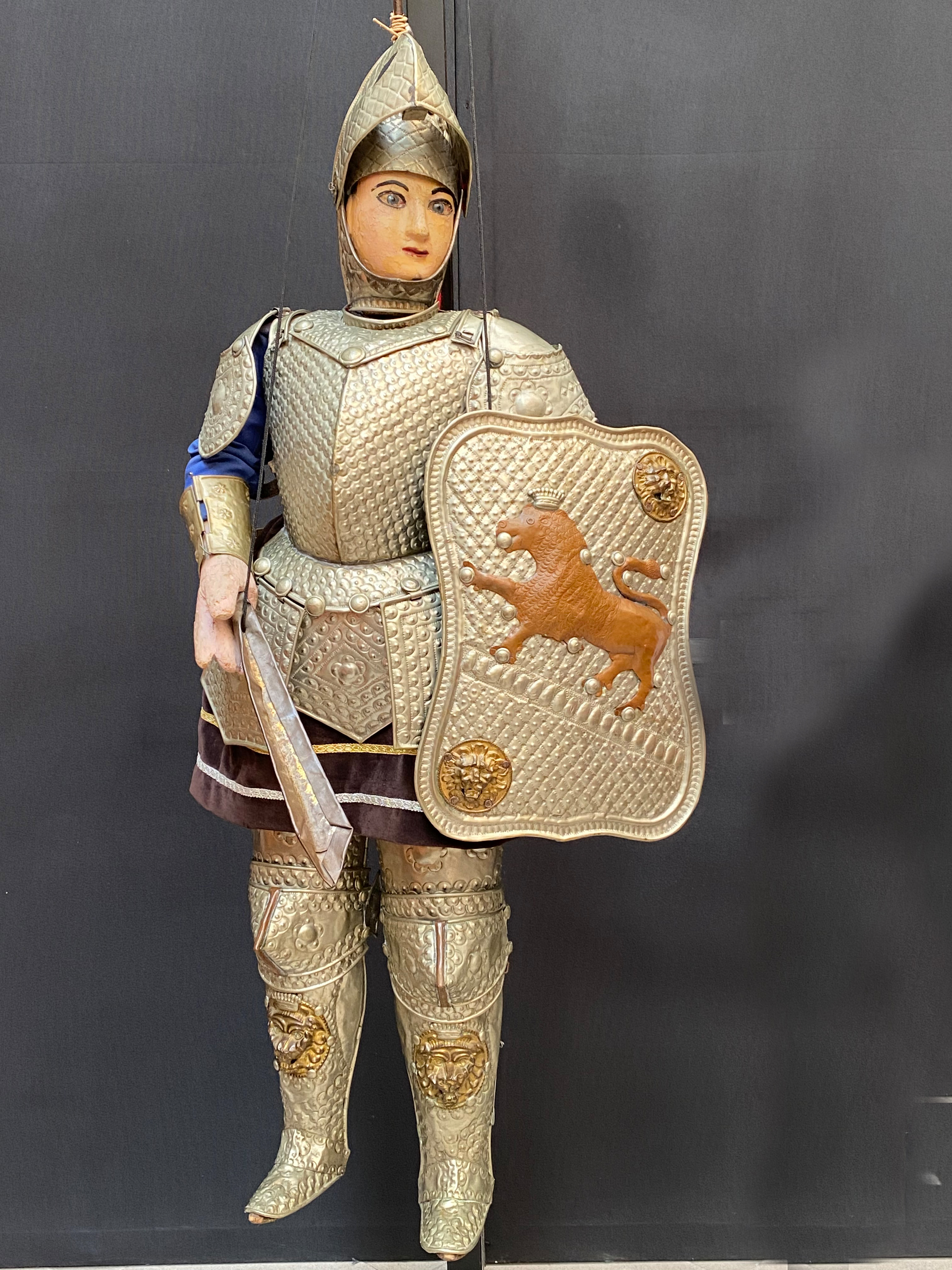
Pupo, Naples style, Renaud. From the collection of the Antonio Pasqualino International Puppet Museum, Palermo

The Opera dei Pupi is attested in Campania and Apulia, where puppets have the same mechanics and figurative characteristics.

The puppets, equipped with a padded wooden skeleton, are 110 cm. and weigh about 20 kg. The legs are semi-articulated. They have a single maneuvering iron rod as both arms are maneuvered with wires. The puppeteers would operate the puppets from a raised bridge behind the backdrop and lent their voices to the puppets by reading from a script placed on a sliding lectern.

As in Catania, the position of the puppeteers determines a greater width of the stage and a reduced depth.

In addition to the warlike stories, which include the Cycle of the Paladins, the Guerrin Meschino and the Palmerino d'Ulivo, historical-romance events, stories of bandits and the stories of the guappi were also represented in Naples.

In Naples, the cartelli are painted in tempera with pastel colors on wrapping paper or on canvas and depict a single scene on which a sheet was affixed that summarized the story of the day.

Among the most famous companies of Campania are those of Angelo Buonandi, the Corelli, the Di Giovannis, Alfredo Farina and Verbale.

== Museums and collections ==
If the show itself is the moment of implementation of the oral and intangible heritage of the puppet masters, the objects associated with the Opera dei Pupi (puppets, backdrops and signs, etc.) also constitute a precious heritage of tangible assets capable of restoring the history of the Sicilian traditional puppet theatre including the different phases it went through, the innovations, and the talented artisans who animated it. Among the most representative museums and collections of the mestieri of individual families of puppeteers, there are:

- Antonio Pasqualino's International Museum of Marionettes
- The Ignazio Buttitta Foundation Collection – Gallery of arti popolari of Geraci
- The Nino Canino Collection – Real Cantina Borbonica, Partinico
- The Ninì Cocivera Collection – Museo cultura e musica popolare dei Peloritani, Gesso
- The Giacomo Cuticchio Senior Collection – Palazzo Branciforte, Palermo
- The Ignazio Munna Collection, Monreale;
- The Pennisi Theater Collection – Macrì of Acireale
- The Gesualdo Pepe Collection, Caltagirone;
- Giuseppe Pitrè's Sicilian ethnographic Museum Collection, Palermo
- The Agostino Profeta Collection, Licata
- The Puglisi Family's Antique Opera dei pupi Collection – Museo civico, Sortino
- The Opera dei Pupi Collection of Randazzo

== Modern developments ==
The Opera dei Pupi nourishes the collective imagination, both in the theatrical, cinematographic and artisan fields. For example, in 2015 Girolamo Botta, of Palermo origin, founded the art company G.Botta in Sulmona. With his mobile theater, he makes his puppets and paintings tour in central Italy. His artifacts have a smaller size than the traditional ones of the Palermo school: in fact, the puppets measure 70 cm, and the theater is also on a smaller scale. Later he gave life to the "Italic puppets" that tell the deeds of the warriors of the Osco-Umbrian peoples during the Social War against the Roman Republic.

== In the media ==
There are numerous film appearances of the Opera dei Pupi as well as documentary films produced. Below is a non-exhaustive list:

Film appearances and reinterpretations:

- Totò a colori, directed by Steno, 1952
- Che cosa sono le nuvole, directed by Pier Paolo Pasolini, 1967
- The Godfather – part 2, directed by Francis Ford Coppola: in the film from 1974 there is a scene depicting Little Italy during the 1900s where a Sicilian puppet theater is represented.

Documentaries

- Nasce un paladino, directed by Roberto Andò and Rita Cedrini, 1983
- Per filo e per segno, directed by Roberto Andò, 1990
- In viaggio con i Pupi, directed by Maurizio Sciarra, 2008
- The Childhood of little Roland. Antonio Pasqualino and the Opera dei Pupi, directed by Matilde Gadliardo and Francesca Milo, 2014
- Pupi a 360 gradi, directed by Alessandra Grassi, 2018
- Cùntami, directed by Giovanna Taviani, 2021
- Pupus, directed by Miriam Cossu Sparagano Ferraye, 2021

== See also ==
- Paladin – Legendary knights of Charlemagne's court
- Carolingean cycle – Body of Medieval literature associated with the history of France
- Matter of France – Body of Medieval literature associated with the history of France
- Unesco
