= Fredrik Ericsson =

Swedish mountaineer and skier (1975–2010)

Jan Fredrik Ericsson
Personal information
- Born: 14 March 1975 Sundsvall, Sweden
- Died: 6 August 2010 (aged 35) K2, Pakistan

Sport
- Sport: Skiing

Jan Fredrik Ericsson (14 March 1975 in Sundsvall, Sweden – 6 August 2010 at K2, Pakistan) was a Swedish mountaineer and extreme skier. He grew up in Umeå in the northern part of Sweden, but spent most of his time in Chamonix, in the French Alps.

== History ==
During the summer of 2003, Ericsson climbed and skied the 7495 meters high Ismoil Somoni Peak (Peak Communism) in Tajikistan. In 2004, he became the first Swede to ski descend an 8000-meters peak when he skied from the central summit of Shisha Pangma (8027 m) in Tibet.

In 2005, Ericsson and his Norwegian friend Jörgen Aamot made an attempt to ski the coveted Laila Peak (6069 m) in Pakistan, but bad conditions forced them to turn around at 5950 m. They were the first people who ever skied down the mountain. That same year they also skied from the summit of Gasherbrum II (8035 m), Ericsson's second 8000-meters peak.

Ericsson returned to the Himalayas in 2007 to attempt his third 8000er, Dhaulagiri (8167 m) in Nepal. Massive amounts of snow and dangerous conditions forced him to turn around at 8000 meters, from where he skied 3000 vertical meters down to base camp.

Ericsson also skied in Turkey, Iceland, Sicily and Svalbard. He was featured in documentary films such as Skiing Everest and ski movies including Free Radicals 618 and Kong Vinter 3.

== Death ==
On 6 August 2010, Gerlinde Kaltenbrunner joined Ericsson and his partner Trey Cook on the way to the summit of K2, leaving Camp 4 (8000 m) at 1:30 a.m. Weather conditions included light snow, 100-metres visibility, 40-km/h wind, around −15˚C with a forecast for conditions to improve throughout the day. Between 6:30 and 7:00, just below the Bottleneck, Cook turned back due to cold hands that had been frostbitten weeks earlier while establishing the team's Camp 3. Ericsson and Kaltenbrunner continued up the Bottleneck and, while Ericsson placed a piton, a rock dislodged, knocking him from his stance. He fell 1,000 metres (3,300 ft) and was killed. Kaltenbrunner aborted the summit attempt.

== Ski descents ==
- In 2003, Ericsson climbed Peak Somoni (Peak Communism) and skied from the summit at 7495 m to 4500 meters.
- In 2004, he climbed the central summit of Shisha Pangma and skied down to 5600 meters.
- In 2005, he climbed Gasherbrum II (8035 m) together with Norwegian Jörgen Aamot and they skied from the summit to 5500 meters.

Other significant ski descents include Mont Blanc, the Gervasutti Couloir on Mont Blanc du Tacul and the Y-couloir on Aiguille d'Argentière.
