= Ligo Ligo =

Ligo Ligo, a Greek phrase meaning "little little", may refer to:

- "Ligo Ligo" (Antique song), a 2001 song by the Greek-Swedish duo Antique
- "Ligo Ligo" (Mando song), a 2002 song by Greek singer Mando
