= List of ski descents of eight-thousanders =

Notable records on mountains over 8000m

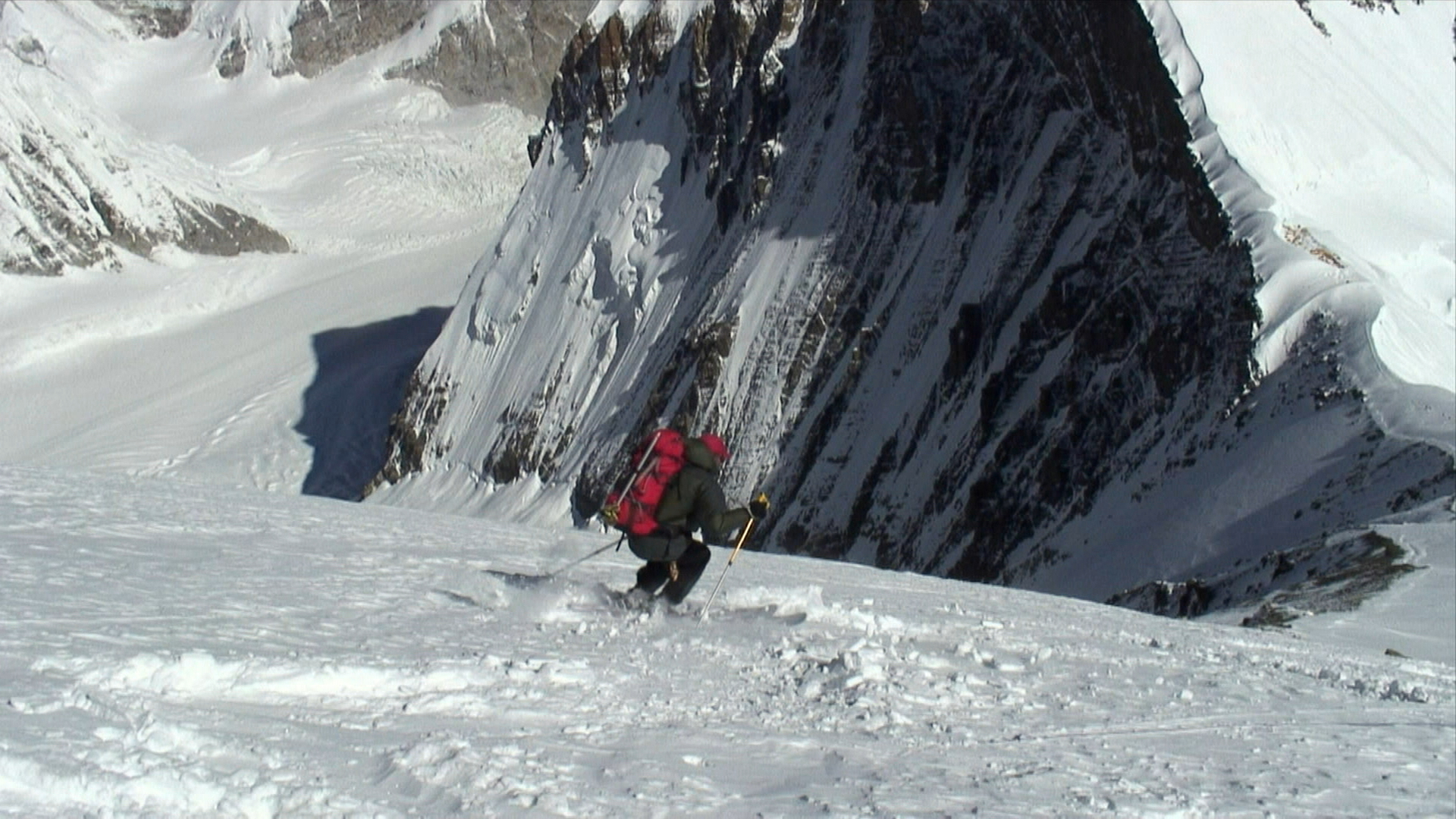
Steve Marolt skiing down the Northeast Ridge of Mount Everest in 2007

This is a list of ski descents of eight-thousanders (which are the 14 highest peaks in the world that are over 8,000 meters (26,247 feet) in elevation). Such feats are part of the sport of ski mountaineering, and also related to the sport of extreme skiing. The first descents can be traced to the 1970s.

== Notable firsts ==
- 1970: Yuichiro Miura (Japan) made the first ski tracks above 8000m in preparation for his schuss from the south col of Everest for the film The Man Who Skied Down Everest.
- Yves Morin† (France) was the first to ski down an 8000m peak which he did on Annapurna in 1979 and over the course of the expedition skied all segments of the descent. However, he died while descending from the summit.
- 1988: Veronique Perillat (France) became the first woman to ski from the top of an eight-thousander and the first woman to ski from over 8000 meters, skiing off the top of Cho Oyu on a monoski.
- 2000: Davo Karničar† (Slovenia) completed the first top-to-bottom (base camp) descent of Everest (South Col route) without removing his skis. However, he benefited from O_{2} use.
- 1996: Hans Kammerlander (Italy) skied the top 300 meters of Everest but climbed down to 7700m before skiing to Advance Base Camp. Kammerlander skied the North Col route.
- 2006: Kit DesLauriers (United States) is the first woman to ski from the top of Everest.
- 2018: Andrzej Bargiel (Poland) completed the first top-to-bottom (base camp) descent of K2 (a combination of the normal route, Basque route, Messner's variant to the Polish route) without removing his skis.
- 2025: Andrzej Bargiel (Poland) First person in history to climb and ski from the summit of Everest without bottled oxygen.

== List by eight-thousander ==
=== Mount Everest ===
NEPAL/TIBET - 8850 meters

Skier Name	Nationality	Date	Start Altitude (meters)	Descent Route	Notes	O2	Age
Hans Kammerlander	Italy	1996	8848	N. face	First 300m from summit, then 1,000m by foot, then skied entire remaining route to Advanced Base Camp (ABC).	No	39
Davo Karničar†	Slovenia	2000	8848	S. col	1st Summit (8,848 meters) to Base Camp (5,380 meters) ski descent by the South Col route, with oxygen, without removing skis (a total vertical drop of 3,488 meters/11,443 Feet) in 4h:40min. Completion of this route required skiing the Hillary Step, the Lhotse Face, and the Khumbu Ice Fall.	Yes	37
Marco Siffredi†	France	2001	8848	Norton Couloir	1st descent of mountain by snowboard (summit to ABC with no rappel)	Yes	22
Stefan Gatt	Austria	2001	8848	Norton Couloir	Snowboard descent was interrupted, complete only from 8848m-8630m and 7600m-6500m due to lack of snow, and had to stop before ABC, thus crediting first complete descent to Siffredi the day after.	No	30
Kit DesLauriers	United States	2006	8848	S. col	1st woman to ski off summit (making her also the first woman to ski from the Seven Summits). Switched to crampons in Hillary Step due to low oxygen. Spent night at South Col (Camp IV, ~7,900 meters), skied Lhotse Face to Camp II (6,400 meters), then during same day to Base Camp using a combination of skis and crampons.	Yes	36
Jimmy Chin	United States	2006	8848	S. Pillar	Skied from Summit; abseiled (rappelled) Hillary Step with skis on; skied from bottom of Hillary Step to South Summit; skied the South Pillar route which is the fall line from Camp 4; spent night at Camp IV (7,900 meters; skied Lhotse Face to Advanced Base Camp (ABC)	Yes	33
Rob Deslauriers	United States	2006	8848	S. col	abseiled Hillary Step with skis on; hiked to South Col; spent night at 7,800 meters; skied Lhotse Face to Advanced Base Camp (ABC)	Yes	41
Olof Sundstrom	Sweden	2006	8848	N. ridge	to Advanced Base Camp (ABC, 6,400 meters), removed skis for several sections	Yes	25
Martin Letzer	Sweden	2006	8848	N. ridge	to ABC (6400), removed skis for several sections	Yes	25
Tormod Granheim	Norway	2006	8848	Norton	to 8,800; 87,50 to 8,500; 8,480 to 7,100, camped overnight; to 6,500m	Yes	31
Tomas Olsson†	Sweden	2006	8848	Norton	died from fall at 8500	Yes	30
Pierre Tardivel	France	1992	8760	S. col	to c2. world altitude record at time	Yes	28
Dominique Perret	Switzerland	1996?	8300	N. face	Hornblein couloir, n. face	No	34
Jean Afanassieff†	France	1978	8200	S. col	to 6200 "not in one smooth run"	Yes	25
Nicolas Jaeger†	France	1978	8200	S. col	to 6200 "not in one smooth run"	Yes	31
Reinhard Patschneider	Italy	1987	8200	lhotse face from S. col	fell dislocated shoulder	Yes	30
Brice Lequertier	France	2003	8200	S. col	to 6100		26
Yuichiro Miura	Japan	1970	8082	S. col	5-6 turns to S. Col, then wore parachute in schuss to ~6200, ended with fall	Yes	37
Petr Machold†	Hungary	2003	7600	N Col-NE Ridge	Snowboard descent hampered by lack of snow, preventing descent of the entire route, which aimed to be the first snowboard descent from the Tibetan side	No	30
Andrzej Bargiel	Poland	2025	8848	S. col	1st summit-to-Base Camp ski descent without supplemental oxygen. Skied from the summit to Camp II via the South Col on Sept 22, then continued to Base Camp on Sept 23	No	37

=== K2 ===
PAKISTAN - 8611 meters

Skier Name	Nationality	Date	Start Altitude (meters)	Descent Route	Notes	O2	Age
Federico Secchi	Italy	2024	8611	Abruzzi	summiteer; skied top 300m, climbed rest of route due to conditions and pitch	No	32
Andrzej Bargiel	Poland	2018	8611	The combination of the normal route (Abruzzi), then Basque route to camp 3, then traverse via Messner's variant to the Polish route and ski down to BC	summiteer; 1st summit to bc ski descent without removing skis	No	30
Hans Kammerlander	Italy	2001	8611	Abruzzi	summiteer; skied top 400m, climbed rest of route due to conditions and pitch	No	44
David Watson	United States	2009	8351	Abruzzi	did not summit; skied to c3 (7351), downclimbed pyramid and chimney, skied 6400 to 5100	Yes	34
Fredrik Ericsson†	Sweden	2010	7800	Cesen/Basque Route	did not summit; skied to BC (5100 m); died in the attempt to reach the summit	No	35
Luis Stitzinger†	Germany	2011	8050	Cesen/Basque Route to C3, traverse to Kukuczka Route, down to BC	did not summit; skied Kukuczka Route to BC (5100 m); longest ski descent up to date	No	39

=== Kangchenjunga ===
NEPAL - 8586 meters

Bartek Ziemski NO O2 Skied from summit

No ski descents from above 8000 meters

=== Lhotse ===
NEPAL - 8516 meters

Skier Name	Nationality	Date	Start Altitude (meters)	Descent Route	Notes	O2	Age
Jamie Laidlaw	United States	2007	8300	Face	to 6400 at night	Yes	27
Hilaree Nelson†	United States	2018	8516	Dream Line	summiteer; 1st summit to bc ski descent	Yes	
Jim Morrison	United States	2018	8516	Dream Line	summiteer; 1st summit to bc ski descent	Yes	
Bartek Ziemski	Poland	2026	8516	unknown	summiteer; 1st summit of 2026	No	31

=== Makalu ===
NEPAL - 8466

Skier Name	Nationality	Date	Start Altitude (Meters)	Descent Route	Notes	O2	Age
Adrian Ballinger	United States	2022	8451	NW Ridge	First summit to crampon point ski descent. Started Ski descent from 15m below summit due to crowds on the summit. Abseiled without skis for 60m in the French Couloir due to pure rock section around 8,077m. Skied NW Ridge before abseiling with skis on from 7100m to 6900m due to steep rock/ice section. Descended the remaining 1000m to crampon point using fixed lines sparingly as hand line. Finished the descent to ABC on foot.	Yes	46
Bartek Ziemski	Poland	2024	8466		Partial ski descent, had to step out of skis on French Couloir, and skied down to 6000m, where the snow ended	No	29

=== Cho Oyu ===
NEPAL - 8188 meters

Skier Name	Nationality	Date	Start Altitude (meters)	Descent Route	Notes	O2	Age
Veronique Perillat	France	1988	8188	NW side	monoski, first woman from 8000m	No	26
Adrian Ballinger	United States	2013	8188	NW side	continuous to C1, no snow below C1; 10m roped skiing at icecliff	Yes	37
Sergey Baranov	Russia	2013	8188	NW side	continuous to C1, no snow below C1; 10m roped skiing at icecliff	Yes	44
Halvard Stave	Norway	2001	8188	NW side	to rock band at 7800; c3 to c2; fell 300m but ok	Yes	25
Thierry Renard	France	1987	8188	NW side	to 6200 - descent disputed	No	41
Russell Reginald Brice	New Zealand	1996	8188	W. ridge -W. face	to 7500	Yes	44
Stefan Gatt	Austria	1999	8100m	NW side	Snowboard descent from start of slope of summit plateau to rock ridge, walked 30m with the board board 8000m to C3 (7450m); next day Gatt snowboarded from C3 to 6800m.	No	28
Marco Siffredi†	France	2000	8188	NW side	Snowboard descent to 6400m	Yes	21
Bertrand Delapierre	France	2000	8188	NW side	Snowboard descent to 6400m	No	24
Hajime Terayama	Japan	2000	8188	NW side	to 7400	Yes	33
Laura Bakos	United States	2000	8188	NW side	to 6600 w/ overnight at camp 3	No	32
Vladimir Smrz	Switzerland	2000	8188	NW side	to c2, removed skis at yellow band	No	35
Vladislav Terzyul†	Ukraine	2000	8188	NW side	to c2; side stepped certain rock bands	No	47
Laura Bakos	United States	2000	8188	NW Side	Skied from summit to 6600m	No	32
Viki Groselj	Slovenia	2001	8188	NW side	top to c1, overnight at c2; no snow below c1	No	49
Kristoffer Erickson	United States	2001	8188	NW side	to c3(7500)	Yes	28
Kazuka Hiraide	Japan	2001	8188	NW side	to c3(7500)	No	22
Kristoffer Erikson	United States	2002	8118	NW side			
Thomas Laemmle	Germany	2003	8188	NW side	to rock band 7800; 7600 to serac (6800); 6750 to snow end (6000)	No	37
Wilhemus Pasquier	Switzerland	2003	8188	NW side	to C1 (6400)	No	54
Greg Nieuwenhuys	Netherlands	2004	8188	NW side	to 8000, overnight at c3 (7500), ski c3/c2 and 6750/6400	No	24
Takashi Nizayama	Japan	2004	8188	NW side	skinned up from 8000; skied from summit to 8000	Yes	43
Tomas Olsson†	Sweden	2004	8188	NW side	continuous to c1 (6400)	No	28
Tormod Granheim	Norway	2004	8188	NW side	continuous to c1 (6400)	No	30
Martin Walter Schmidt	New Zealand	2004	8188	NW side	continuous to c1 (6400)	No	44
Todd Cavell Windle	New Zealand	2004	8188	NW side	to 7800	Yes	30
Jean Noel Urban†	France	2005	8188	NW side	continuous to c2(6750)	No	45
Kasha Rigby†	United States	2005	8188	NW side	to abc (5700) with overnight at c2; 1st telemark descent	Yes	35
Hilaree Nelson†	United States	2005	8188	NW side	to abc with overnight at c2	Yes	32
Kenton Edward Cool	Great Britain	2006	8188	NW Side	to abc (abseiled icefall c2-c1)	Yes	33
Dusan Debelak	Slovenia	2006	8188	NW side	to c2 (6750)	No	40
Octavio DeFazio	Argentina	2006	8188	NW side	to c1 (6400) (except 10m ice cliff)	Yes	36
Martina Palm	Switzerland	2006	8188	NW side	to c1 (6400) (except 10m ice cliff)	Yes	32
Steve Marolt	United States	2007	8188	NW side	to c1 (6600)	No	42
Medhi Didault	France	2007	8188	NW side	to c1 (6600)	No	22
Tyler Johnson	United States	2007	8188	NW side	to abc (5700) with overnight at c2	No	31
Rory Stark	United States	2007	8188	NWside	to abc (5700) with overnight at c2	No	36
James Gile	United States	2007	8150	NW side	to c1(6600)	No	43
Michael Aasheim	United States	2005	8100	NW Side	skied to abc (5700) (thru icefall)	No	43
Daniel McCann	United States	2005	8100	NW side	skied to abc (5700) (thru icefall)	No	43
Mike Marolt	United States	2007	8100	NW side	to c1 (6600)	No	42
Fabio Beozzi	Italy	2011	8100	NW side	to 6000 (thru Messner Route, 1st ski descent)	No	37
Jose Diogo Giraldes Tavares	Portugal	2011	8050	NW side	to ABC (5700) with overnight at c2 (7100)	No	44
Brooks Entwistle	United States	2016	8188	NW side	To C1; No snow below C1; rappelled ice cliff and yellow band	Yes	49
Zebulon Blais	United States	2016	8188	NW side	Continuous to C1; no snow below C1; roped skiing through yellow band and ice cliff	Yes	33
Emily Harrington	United States	2016	8188	NW side	Continuous to C1; no snow below C1; roped skiing through ice cliff	Yes	30
Adrian Ballinger	Great Britain	2016	8188	NW side	Continuous to C1; no snow below C1; roped skiing through ice cliff	Yes	40
Aleksander Ostrowski†	Poland	2015	8188	NW side	To C2, removed skis, packed a tent and then to C1 on skis	No	26
Caroline Gleich	United States	2018	8188	NW side	To C1: rappelled yellow band and ice cliff	Yes	32

=== Dhaulagiri ===
NEPAL - 8167 meters

Skier Name	Nationality	Date	Start Altitude (meters)	Descent Route	Notes	O2	Age
David Fojtik	Czech Republic	2009	8147	NE Ridge	20m below summit couloir to 30m above C3 (7200);C2 (6700) to BC (4700)	No	36
Bartek Ziemski	Poland	2023	8167	NE Ridge	Ziemski skied down the West Couloir all the way to base camp, but took off his skis briefly at C3 to wait for his team members and at C2 to pack up his tent.	No	28

=== Manaslu ===
NEPAL - 8163 meters

Skier Name	Nationality	Date	Start Altitude (meters)	Descent Route	Notes	O2	Age
Vladimir Vladimirov Pavlov	Bulgaria	2019	8150	NE Face	Snowboard descent from 8,150m to 6,200 m	Yes	38
Anthony B Marra	United States	2019	8163	NE Face	skis off 6100 to 5800, no sherpa support above BC	No	28
Wei Xie	China	2018	8100	NE Face	Snowboard from 100m below summit to C3, then back to BC at the same day.	Yes	40
Kimiko Kawasaki	Japan	2010	8000	NE Face	After conventional summit, snowboard descent to 7500m	Yes	34
Kenji Kondo	Japan	2010	8000	NE Face	After conventional summit, snowboard descent to 7500m	Yes	48
Jess Shade	United States	2021	8163	NE Face	skis off part of C4 to C3 due to wind slabs and C2 to C1, second female descent; Minimal support by using tents in high camps	Yes	33
Benedikt Bohm	Germany	2012	8163	NE Face	to bc (5000); skis off 7400-7300	No	35
Vitaly Lazo	Russia	2017	8163	NE Face	to c1 (5300); skis off 7400-7300 and 6400-6200	No	44
Anton Pugovkin	Russia	2017	8000	NE Face	to c1 (5300); skis off 7400-7300 and 6400-6200	No	39
Adrian Ballinger	United States	2011	8163	NE Face	skied summit cornice from top, skis off 6100 to 5800 on descent from summit due to avalanche, 6100-5800 (hourglass) skied on previous day	Yes	34
Andrzej Bargiel	Poland	2014	8163	NE Face	skied from summit to 6500m	No	26
Sergey Baranove	Russia	2011	8148	NE Face	skis off 6100 to 5800 "hourglass"	Yes	
Guy Willet	Great Britain	2009	8148	NE Face	downclimbed 1st 15m, skied to 5050 w/ 5m downclimb @6250	Yes	38
Robert Kay	United States/Australia	2011	8148	NE Face	downclimbed 1st 15m, skied to 7400 and 5800 to 5000 (crampon point)	Yes	49
Emma Jack	Great Britain	2009	8148	NE Face	Skied to 5000m where snow ran out w/ short downclimb @ 6250m	Yes	36
Kenton Cool	Great Britain	2010	8148	NE Face	to C2 (6400)/ 2 days	Yes	37
Andrew Eggleston	Great Britain	2010	8148	NE Face	to C2 (6400)/ 2 days	Yes	30
Josef Millinger	Austria	1981	8133	NE Face	skied from about 30m below summit to c5; then to c1 next day	No	39
Peter Woergoetter	Austria	1981	8133	NE Face	skied from about 30m below summit to c5; then to c1 next day	No	39
Nobukazu Kuriki† 栗城史多	Japan	2008	8133	NE Face	to c3 (6900) then to bc next day (4800)	No	26
Sebastian Haag†	Germany	2012	8003	NE Face	to basecamp (5000) with skis off 7400-7300	No	34
Constantin Pade		2012	8003	NE Face	to basecamp (5000) with skis off 7400-7300	No	
Andres Jorquera Taipa	Chile	2009	8000	NE Face	to 5000 (crampon pt) over 3 days	No	33
Anna Tybor	Poland	2021	8156	NE Face	ski descent from fore summit, stopped to pick up gear at camps 4 and 3 on way down	No	29

Benjamin Darcé -USA from 8100 (just below summit ridge) no oxygen or Sherpa support.

=== Nanga Parbat ===
PAKISTAN - 8126 meters

SkierName	Nationality	Date	Start Altitude (meters)	Descent Route	Notes	O2	Age
Hans Kammerlander	Italy	1990	8025	Diamir face (Kinshofer)	downclimb top 100m, ski to bc	No	34
Diego Wellig	Switzerland	1990	8025	Diamir face (Kinshofer)	downclimb 1st 100m, ski to bc	No	29
Luis Stitzinger†	Germany	2008	7850	Central Diamir Face (Independent Line parallel to Messner Solo Route 1978)	complete ski descent, ski to side moraine, 4600 m	No	39
Boris Langenstein	France	2019	8070		ski descent with skis on the entire way is the most complete ski descent recorded		33
Tom Lafaille	France	2024	8060	Diamir face	did not summit due to bad weather	No	23

=== Annapurna ===
NEPAL - 8093 meters

Skier Name	Nationality	Date	Start Altitude (meters)	Descent Route	Notes	O2	Age
Yves Morin†	France	1979	8091	N Face	skied all sections but died at 6600 on descent from summit	No	34
Davo Karničar†	Slovenia	1995	8091	normal route	1st descent from top to bc in one day - hawley notes suggest started 1200m below top?	No	32
Andrej Karnicar	Slovenia	1995	8091	normal route	1st descent from top to bc in one day	No	25
Bartek Ziemski	Poland	2023	8091	N Face	Skied from summit to camp 4 to wait for team member. Then skied to camp 3 without rappelling. At camp 2, they learned another climber had fallen in a crevasse, and went to assist. Later skied from camp 2 to 4800 m, when the snow ran out.	No	28

=== Gasherbrum I ===
- PAKISTAN - 8080 meters

Skier Name	Nationality	Date	Start Altitude (meters)	Descent Route	Notes	O2	Age
Sylvain Saudan	Switzerland	1982	8080	N. Face	possibly longest 50 degree slope ever skied, descent required making 3,000 metres of jump turns	No	42
Iztok Tomazin	Slovenia	1995	8080	N. Face	Overnight at c3, Abseiled 8m section in Japanese couloir, to 5300	No	45
Luis Stitzinger†	Germany	2018	8080	N. Face	Skied from the summit, descended a passage 7800-7600 by foot (icy), overnight at c3, descended Japanese Couloir by foot (avalanche hazard), to 5400 (edge of icefall)	No	50
Andrzej Bargiel	Poland	2023	8080	N. Face			35

=== Broad Peak ===
PAKISTAN - 8051 meters

Skier Name	Nationality	Date	Start Altitude (meters)	Descent Route	Notes	O2	Age
Hans Kammerlander	Italy	1994	7850	West Ridge	descent from col (7850 m) to bc	No	38
Luis Stitzinger†	Germany	2011	7850	West Ridge	descent from col (7850 m) to bc	No	39
Andrzej Bargiel	Poland	2015	8051	West Ridge	only descent from top to bc in 3 hrs	No	27
Bartosz Ziemski	Poland	2022	8051	West Ridge	took his skis off twice - the first time for the return ascent of Rocky Summit and the second time at the railing ropes in the krux on the rocky traverse	No	27
Tom Lafaille	France	2023	8051	West Ridge		No	21
Anna Tybor	Poland	2023	8051	West Ridge		No	31

=== Gasherbrum II ===
PAKISTAN - 8034 meters

Skier Name	Nationality	Date	Start Altitude (meters)	Descent Route	Notes	O2	Age
Jacques Demarolle	France	1984	8034	SW Ridge	skied summit to c4 (7500)		
Frederic Maurel	France	1984	8034	SW Ridge	skied summit to c4 (7500)		
P. Glaizes	France	1984	8034	SW Ridge	skied summit to c4 (7500)		
P. Guedu	France	1984	8034	SW Ridge	skied summit to c4 (7500)		
Wilhemus Pasquier	Switzerland	1984	8034	SW Ridge	summit to bc (5200) over 3 days all on ski including 10m serac repel		35
Patrice Bournat	France	1984	8034	SW Ridge	summit to bc (5200) over 3 days all on ski including 10m serac repel		
Thierry Renard	France	1985	8034	South Face	bivouacked at 7500, skied to c1 (5400) next day.		42
Fredrik Ericsson†	Sweden	2005	8034	East and south Face	from summit by the east and then direct south face to ABC (5600m)	No	30
Jorgen Aamot	Norway	2005	8034	East and south Face	from summit by the east and then direct south face to ABC (5600m)	No	31
Jean Noel Urban†	France	2006	8034	SW Ridge		No	46
Luis Stitzinger†	Germany	2006	8034	SW Ridge	17hr ABC to ABC (5900m); skied entire descent	No	37
Benedikt Bohm	Germany	2006	8034	SW Ridge	summit to c3	No	29
Sebastian Haag†	Germany	2006	8034	SW Ridge	summit to c3	No	28
Benedikt Bohm	Germany	2006	8034	SW Ridge	17hr ABC to ABC (5900m); skied entire descent	No	29
Sebastian Haag†	Germany	2006	8034	SW Ridge	17hr ABC to ABC (5900m); skied entire descent	No	28
Bartosz Ziemski	Poland	2022	8034	SW Ridge	due to the approach near Camp 2, he takes off his skis. Then, on the first steep part of Banana Ridge, he makes a lateral descent, secured by a rappelling rope, after which he continues down to Camp 1. The last section from Camp 1 to Base Camp is done half on skis (the flat part of the glacier), while the Icefall is done on foot.	No	27
Andrzej Bargiel	Poland	2023	8034	SW		No	35

=== Shisha Pangma ===
CHINA - 8027 meters

Skier Name	Nationality	Date	Start Altitude (meters)	Descent Route	Notes	O2	Age
Peter Woergoetter	Austria	1985	8027	NE Face	uncertain if descended from main or central summit		44
Oswald Gassler	Austria	1985	8027	NE Face	uncertain if descended from main or central summit		38
Mark Whetu	New Zealand	1987	8027	Northern route	AAJ'88/279 suggests whetu from summit		28
Jerzy Kukuczka†	Poland	1987	~8000	Northern Route	from bivac at around 8000m, partial descent	No	39
Jean Noel Urban†	France	2005	8027	SW Face - scott rte	main summit partial descent	No	45
Giorgio Daidola	Italy	1988	8027	Northern Route		No	
Pino Negri	Italy	1988	8027	Northern Route			
Christian Kuntner†	Italy	1998	8027			No	36
Mike Marolt	United States	2000	8008	Northern Route	central summit; 1st N. Am. to ski from 8000m	No	36
Steve Marolt	United States	2000	8008	Northern route	central summit; 1st N. Am. to ski from 8000m	No	36
Fredrik Ericsson†	Sweden	2004	8008		central summit	No	29
Jean Noël Urban†	France	2004	8008	SW Face - Loretan rte	central summit partial descent	No	44
Mark Newcomb	United States	2005	8008	Untsch	central summit	No	38
Kent McBride	United States	2005	8008	Untsch	central summit	No	
Luis Stitzinger†	Germany	2013	8027	Inaki Route NE Face	main summit to end moraine(5900m); skied entire descent	No	44

== See also ==
- Skiing Everest, 2009 documentary film
- Extreme skiing
- Ski mountaineering
- List of ski descents in North America
