= List of ski descents in North America =

This is a list of ski descents in North America which are notable as first descents or otherwise.

It includes a number of ski descents covered in Fifty Classic Ski Descents of North America, a book published by Capitol Peak Publishing in 2010. The book was edited by Chris Davenport, Art Burrows, and Penn Newhard, with significant contributions from mountaineers who skied many of the listed descents. Contributors included Jimmy Chin, Pete Costain, Lou Dawson, Kristoffer Erickson, Lorne Glick, Greg Hill, Andrew McLean, Hilaree O'Neill, Eric Pehota, Glen Plake, Kevin Quinn, Chic Scott, Lowell Skoog, Ptor Spricenieks, Mark Synnott, and Jon Walsh.

The list of 50 ski descents has become a challenge for some. Two mountaineers, at least, have worked ahead towards skiing all of these, but have made a point to call it folly, if they were to ignore safety considerations merely to bag another descent on the list. The corresponding term peak bagging, about quests to ascend all mountains in a defined set, is likewise pejorative.

== Canada ==
=== Eastern Canada ===
- Polar Star Couloir, Mount Beluga, Baffin Island

=== Columbia Mountains/Rockies ===
- Mount Robson/Yuh Hai Has Kun, North Face, BC
- Aemmer Couloir, Mount Temple, AB
- Mount Columbia, Southeast Face, AB
- Skyladder, Mount Andromeda, BC
- Comstock Couloir, Mount Dawson, BC
- Seven Steps to Paradise, Youngs Peak, BC
- Rogers/Swiss Peaks, Uber Tour, BC
- Rogers Pass to Bugaboos Traverse, BC

=== Canada Coast Mountains ===
- Combatant Couloir, Mount Combatant
- Mount Currie, Pencil and Central Couloirs
- Joffre Peak, Northwest Face
- Spearhead Traverse, Whistler

== United States ==
=== Eastern U.S. ===
- Tuckerman Ravine, Mount Washington, NH
- Huntington Ravine, Mount Washington, NH

=== Colorado ===
- Landry Line, Pyramid Peak
- North Maroon Peak, North Face
- Cross Couloir, Mount of the Holy Cross
- Wilson Peak, Northeast Face
- Silver Couloir, Buffalo Mountain

=== Utah ===
- Mount Superior, South Face
- Hypodermic Needle, Thunder Peak
- Cold Fusion, Mount Timpanogos
- Mount Tukuhnikivatz, La Sals

=== Wyoming ===
- Ford-Stettner Couloir, Grand Teton
- The Skillet, Mount Moran
- East Face Glacier Route, Middle Teton

=== Idaho/Montana ===
- The Sickle, Horstmann Peak, ID
- Devil's Bedstead, North Face, ID
- Castle Peak, South Face, ID
- North Couloir, McGowan Peak, ID
- Mount Stimson, Southwest Face, MT
- The Patriarch, Glacier Peak, MT

=== California/Nevada ===
- Mount Whitney, Mountaineer's Route, CA
- Stair Steps Couloir, Mount Williamson, CA
- Split Couloir, Split Mountain, CA
- Bloody Couloir, Bloody Mountain, CA
- Mount Shasta, Avalanche Gulch, CA
- Terminal Cancer Couloir, Ruby Mountains, NV

=== Pacific Northwest ===
- Northwest Route, Mount Shuksan, WA
- Watson's Traverse, Mount Baker, WA
- Fuhrer Finger, Mount Rainier, WA
- Newton-Clark Headwall, Mount Hood, OR
- Eldorado Peak, Eldorado Glacier, WA

=== Alaska ===
- University Peak, South Face
- Mira Face, Mount Saint Elias
- Pontoon Peak, Southeast Ridge
- The Sphinx, Southeast Ridge
- The Ramp, Meteorite Mountain
- Messner Couloir, Denali

== Mexico ==
- Pico de Orizaba, 3rd tallest mountain in North America, Veracruz/Puebla

== See also ==
- List of ski descents of Eight-Thousanders (mountains over 26,000 feet)
