= Glacier Peak (disambiguation) =

Glacier Peak is a stratovolcano in the Cascade Range, Washington state.

Glacier Peak may also refer to:

- Glacier Peak (Bow Range), on the border of British Columbia and Alberta
- Glacier Peak (New Zealand), in the Southern Alps
- Glacier Peak (Oregon), in the Wallowa Mountains
- Glacier Peak (Park County, Montana), in the Beartooth Mountains
- Glacier Peak High School, Snohomish, Washington
- Glacier Peak Wilderness, a protected area surrounding Glacier Peak, Washington
