= Olof Sundstrom =

Swedish mountaineer

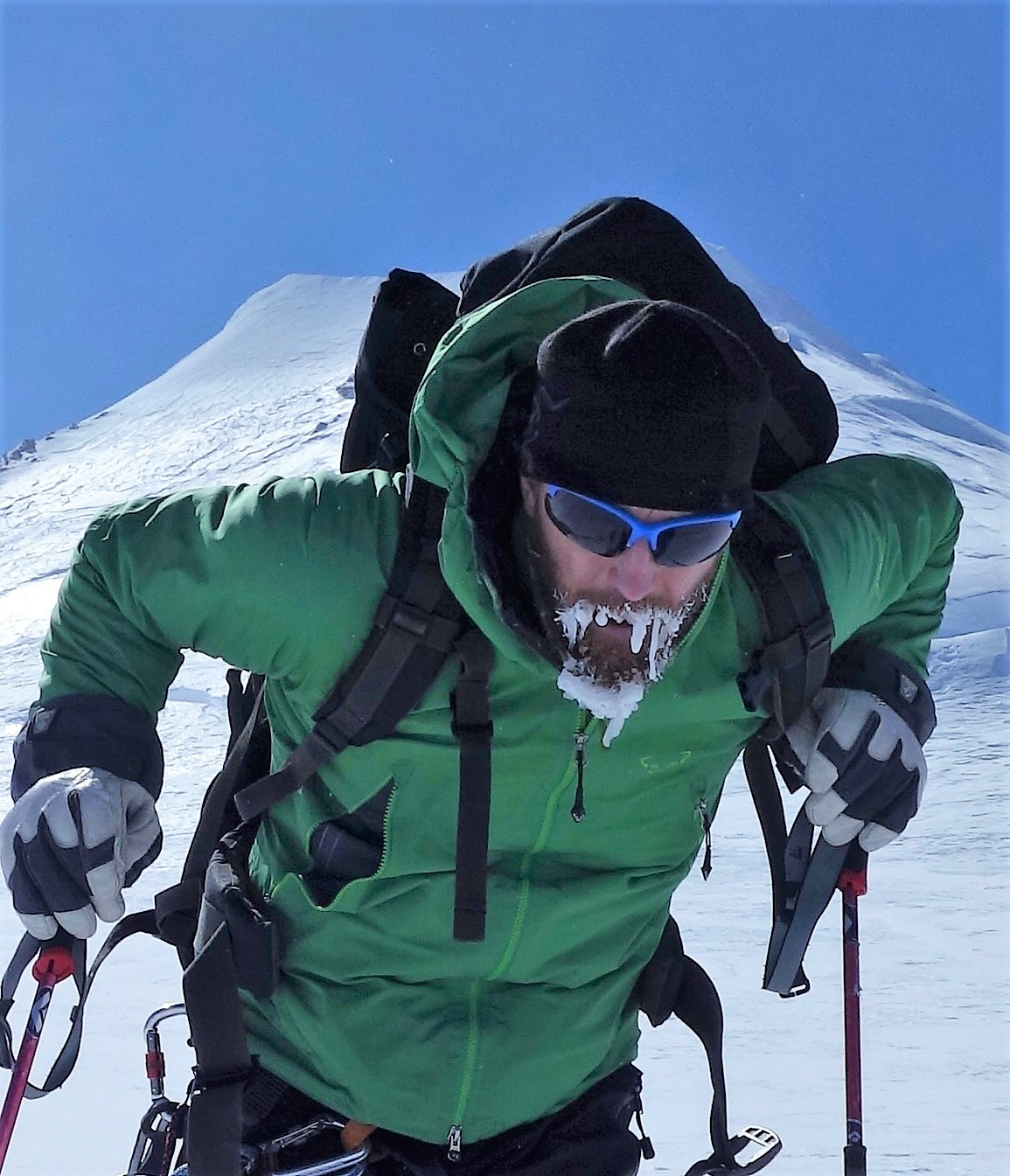
Olof Sundstrom on Mt. Logan 2017

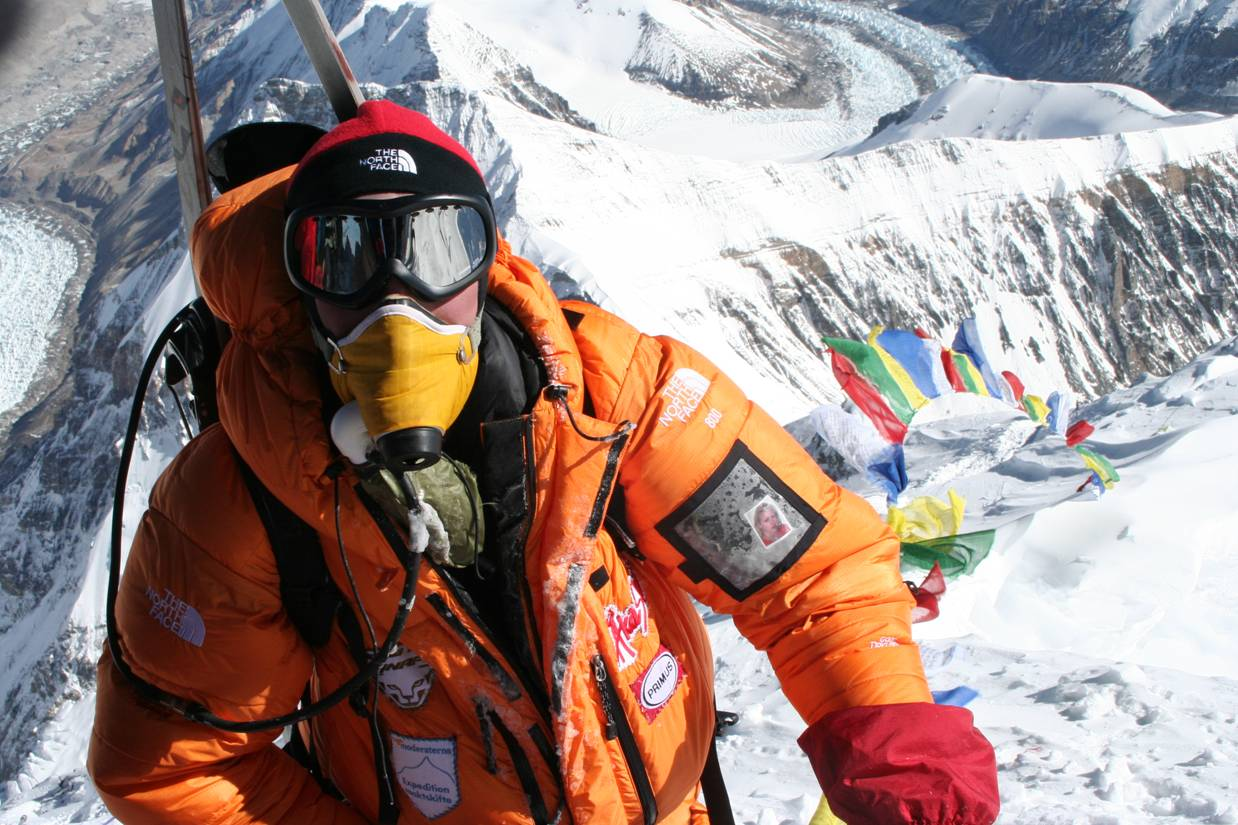
Olof Sundstrom on Mt. Everest 2006

Olof Sundstrom (born 1980) is a Swedish adventurer, high altitude mountaineer, solo sailor and inspirational speaker.

He is most noted, together with Martin Letzter, as the first person to climb and ski off the Seven Summits.

== Life ==
Sundstrom holds a M.Sc. in Engineering and a M.Sc. in Business Strategy from Lund University, Sweden, and ETH, Switzerland. He is a Managing Director and Partner at Boston Consulting Group. He is also a military officer in the Swedish Marines and a trained Combat diver.

He is married to Petra Sundstrom and has three children.

He is a fellow of The Explorers Club. He lives in the Bay Area, United States.

== Expeditions ==
In 2003 to 2008, Olof climbed and skied down from the highest peaks on each continent, including Mount Elbrus, 5643m, Russia, Denali, 6193m, Alaska, Aconcagua, 6962m, Argentina, Carstensz Pyramid, 4884m, Papua Province, Mount Kosciuszko, 2228m, Australia, Mount Kilimanjaro, 5895m, Tanzania, Vinson Massif, 4892m, Antarctica and Mount Everest, 8848 m, Nepal/Tibet.

In 2004, he also made an attempt to solo climb and ski mt. Cho Oyu, 8201m, Tibet, the sixth highest mountain in the world, but had to abandon the climb due to severe high altitude sickness. Later the same year, he sailed from Sweden to Australia in a 8m/28 ft boat, including a solo crossing of the Pacific Ocean. In 2008, he broke the speed record overland across Africa, from the Cape of Good Hope to the Great Pyramid of Giza 9000 km north (despite having to fly over the border of Sudan and Egypt due to a lack of roads).

In 2010, he made a horseback expedition together with his wife Petra across South America, from the Atlantic Coast south of Bahía Blanca, Argentina, across the Andes to the coast of the Pacific in Chile. In 2012, the couple, together with their then eight month old son, followed the Colorado River, from the source in the Rocky Mountains to the sea in the Gulf of California, Mexico 2330 km away, using a foldable canoe and bikes. In 2013, he successfully raced the Tuareg desert rally in North Africa, along parts of the classic route of the Dakar Rally. In 2016 he sailed a traditional Ngalawa along the east coast of Africa, from southern Tanzania to Zanzibar.

Since 2015, Olof has been chasing the record for the longest vertical line ever skied, including a failed attempt 2015 on Mount Saint Elias, 5489m, Alaska, that had to be abandoned due to snow conditions, and the lack of a constantly skiable line from the summit to the sea. In 2017, he successfully climbed and skied down Mount Logan, 5959m, the highest peak in Canada, but was not able to ski all the way to sea level.

Other notable mountains climbed and skied include Rwenzori Mountains, 5109m, Democratic Republic of the Congo/Uganda, Aoraki / Mount Cook, 3724m, the highest peak in New Zealand, and Mt. Ararat, 5123 m, the highest mountain in Turkey.

In 2022, he finished the Mongol Derby endurance horse race in Mongolia, the world's longest horse back race. He also finished the Sonora Desert Rally on a Motorcycle.

== Records ==
Olof was the first person together with Martin Letzter, to ski off the peaks of the Seven Summits, as defined by Reinhold Messner. He was also the first Swede to climb the Seven Summits. He holds the speed record overland across Africa, "Cape to Cairo", in 13 days and 18 hours.

== Accidents and Rescue Missions ==
Olof caught Pulmonary edema during a climb of mt. Cho Oyu in Tibet 2004 at 7900 m. and was carried down the mountain by yak herders. He later got stuck in the Typhoon "Sonca" during a solo sail across the Pacific 2005. Together with Martin Letzter and two Sherpas, Olof conducted the search on Mt Everest for climber Tomas Olsson, who fell to his death in 2006. They found the body after four days at 6700m below the Hornbein Couloir and carried the body down to the base camp.

Together with Martin Letzter, Olof helped rescue ten climbers that had got stuck in a Bivouac shelter in a Snowstorm after one member took a fall in a Crevasse, halfway up the Vinson Massif in Antarctica in 2006, among them the Swedish climber Fredrik Sträng.

== Works ==
- Martin Letzer and Olof Sundstrom, Ad hock rocks: Seven summits på skidor (Prisma, 2007), ISBN 9151849100
- 'Risk Management at a high level: A risk assessment of Expedition Travel' (unpublished MA thesis, Lund University of Technology)
