= Davo Karničar =

Slovene alpinist and extreme skier (1962–2019)

Davorin "Davo" Karničar
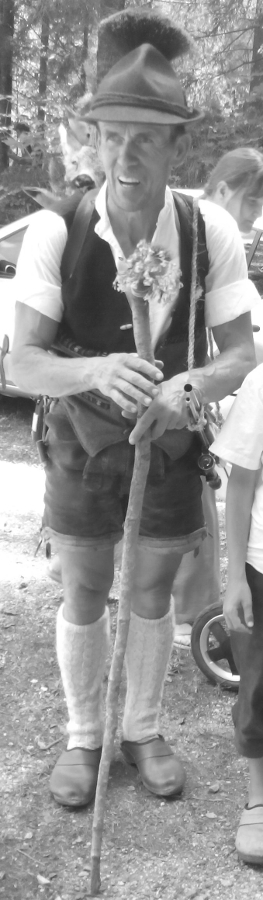
- Davorin "Davo" Karničar on ethnographic event Sheep bal in Jezersko.
- Born: October 26, 1962; Zgornje Jezersko, SR Slovenia, SFR Yugoslavia
- Died: September 16, 2019 (aged 56); Zgornje Jezersko, Slovenia.
- Occupations: Alpinist, Extreme skier
- Known for: First skier to ski nonstop from the summit of Mount Everest to base camp, 12,000 feet, first skier to make a successful descent from the summit of Annapurna

Davorin "Davo" Karničar (October 26, 1962 – September 16, 2019) was a Slovene alpinist and ski mountaineer.

As an active mountain skier, Davo was a member of the Yugoslavian national mountain ski team between 1975 and 1982. An alpinist since 1980, he made an estimated 1,700 climbs and descents.

He made his first summit of an eight-thousander in 1989 when he climbed Nanga Parbat in Pakistan, later summitting K2 in 1993. In 1995, he made his first ski descent from Annapurna in Nepal and, in 1996, he made a ski descent from Shishapangma in Tibet. When Davo was 38 years old he became the first person to ski down from the summit of the highest mountain in the world, Mount Everest, on October 7, 2000. The feat took four hours and 40 minutes to complete.

He was the first person to make a complete ski descent from the Seven Summits, less than one month after the first person, Kit DesLauriers, skied from the top of all of the seven summits, but did not accomplish complete descents on Everest and Denali.

His Seven Summits descents were:

- Mount Everest (8848 m) in Asia in October 2000
- Kilimanjaro (5895 m) in Africa in November 2001
- Mount Elbrus (5642 m) in Europe in July 2002
- Aconcagua (6960 m) in South America in January 2003
- Mount Kosciuszko (2228 m) in Australia in August 2003
- Denali (6194 m) in North America in June 2004
- Puncak Jaya (4884 m) in Oceania in September 2005
- Vinson Massif (4897 m) in Antarctica in December 2006

The other significant peaks he skied from include the north-east face of Eiger and the east face of Matterhorn in Switzerland and Mont Blanc, the highest peak in Alps in the border between Italy and France. In February 2001, he guided the first ski school for Nepalese children on the Khumbu Glacier in Nepal.

In 2017, he collaborated with ski manufacturer Elan to produce the world's first mass production folding skis.

He died on September 16, 2019 in a tree-cutting accident on his property.

== See also ==
- List of 20th-century summiters of Mount Everest
