= Urdok Ridge =

Karakoram mountain range

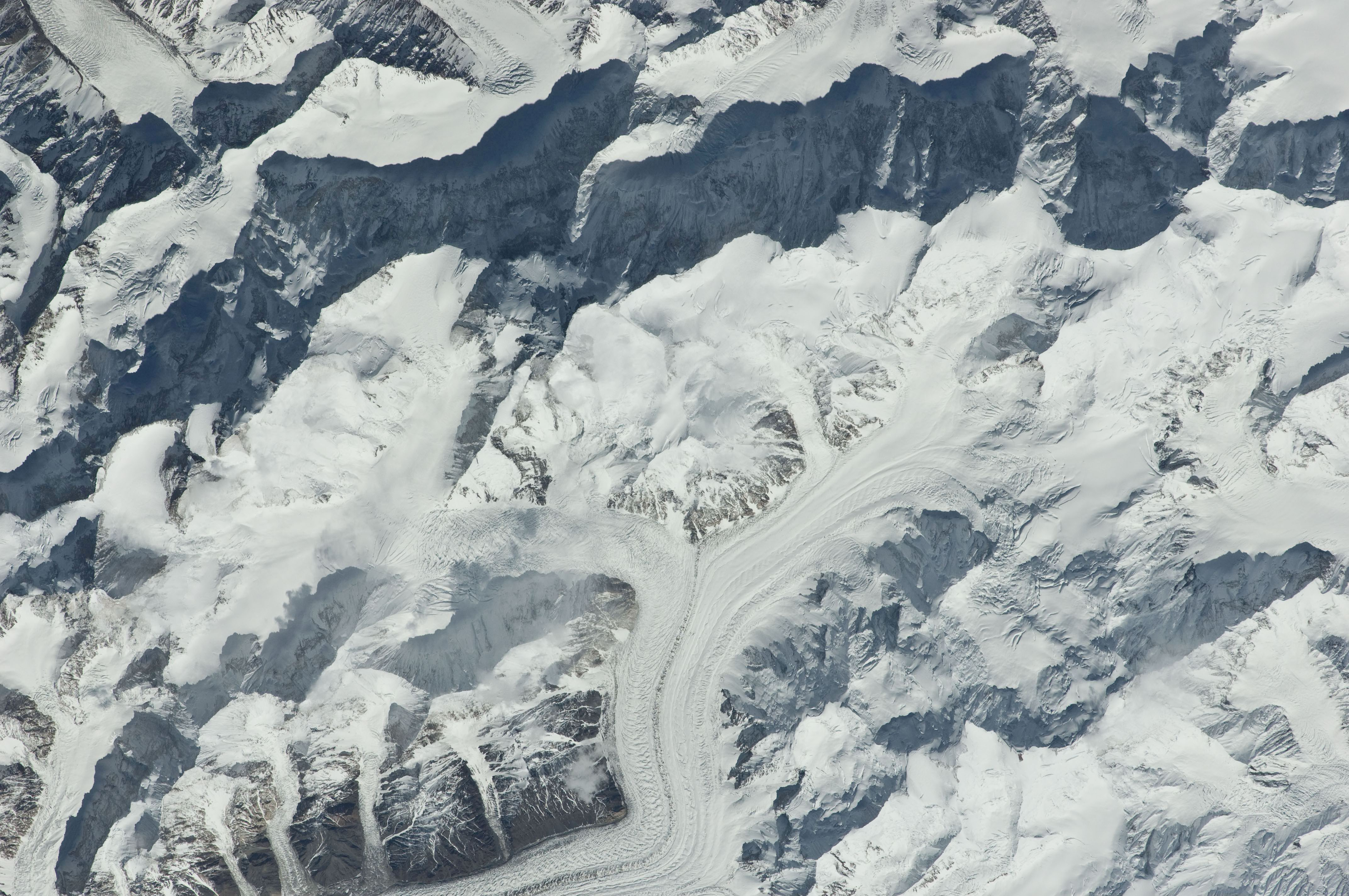
- Overhead view of the Gasherbrum group from space, the Urdok range runs from left to right, noticeable due to the shadow on the north face

Geography
- Location within Pakistan Location within China
- Countries: Pakistan and China
- Region: Xinjiang (China)
- Parent range: Karakoram

The Urdok ridge is a 7,250-metre (23,790 ft) high mountain ridge which follows the continuation of the southwest ridge of Gasherbrum I.

Two main chains of the Karakoram range meet on this ridge. Along the Urdok ridge, there are several peaks. From north to south these include:

Urdok I (7,250 also known as Urdok Kangri I), and an unnamed peak (7,136 m), before the ridge reaches the Abruzzi Saddle mountain pass (6,782 m). The Abruzzi Saddle marks the boundary between the Gasherbrum group and the Sia Kangri massif.

Continuing south, the ridge rises to Urdok II (7,082 m) and Urdok III (6,950 m) before reaching Sia Kangri. Some recognize Urdok II as Sia Kangri North.

== Nomenclature ==
In 1934, Günter Oskar Dyhrenfurth explored the region while looking for access points to climb Gasherbrum I. He named the Urdok ridge as it drops off to the northeast towards the Urdok Glacier. The glacier was already known by this name on the Chinese side of the Karakoram at this time.

Urdok I
- Urdok Kangri I

Highest point
- Elevation: 7,250 m (23,790 ft)
- Prominence: 270 m (890 ft)
- Parent peak: Gasherbrum I
- Isolation: 1.34 km (0.83 mi)
- Coordinates: 35°42′17″N 76°43′42″E

Geography
- Location: Gilgit-Baltistan
- Parent range: Baltoro Muztagh

Climbing
- First ascent: 4 August 1975 by Hanns and Liselotte Schell, Robert Schauer, Herbert Zefferer and Karl Hub

Urdok II
- Urdok Kangri II

Highest point
- Elevation: 7,082 m (23,235 ft)
- Prominence: 262 m (860 ft)
- Isolation: 1.89 km (1.17 mi)
- Coordinates: 35°41′9″N 76°44′43″E

Geography
- Location: Gilgit-Baltistan

Climbing
- First ascent: Unclimbed

Urdok III
- Urdok Kangri III

Highest point
- Elevation: 6,950 m (22,800 ft)
- Prominence: 180 m (590 ft)
- Parent peak: Ghent Kangri
- Isolation: .03 km (0.019 mi)
- Coordinates: 35°40′53″N 76°45′27″E

Geography
- Location: Xinjiang

== Climbing history ==
There is little recorded history of climbs of mountains of this group.

=== Urdok I ===
Urdok I was climbed for the first time in 1975 by an Austrian expedition led by Hanns Schell. While enroute to Gasherbrum I, the expedition detoured to summit Urdok I, summiting Gasherbrum I several days later.

=== Urdok II ===
In 2018, Luis Stitzinger led a team from Amical alpin to be the first to summit Urdok II. After considerable snow fell at base camp, the team abandoned the expedition, and moved to summit Gasherbrum I.
