= Alix von Melle =

German alpinist and PR professional

- Born: 1 September 1971 (age 54); Hamburg, Germany
- Education: Geography
- Alma mater: LMU Munich
- Occupations: Mountaineer, PR professional
- Known for: Climbing more eight-thousanders than any other German woman
- Spouse(s): Luis Stitzinger (2011—his death, 2023)
- Children: 0
- Website: https://www.goclimbamountain.de/en

Alix von Melle (September 1, 1971, in Hamburg) is a German mountaineer and alpinist who is considered one of Germany's most successful high altitude mountaineers, summitting seven eight-thousanders without using supplemental oxygen.

== Biography ==
Alix von Melle was the third of four children born to a school teacher and businessman in Ahrensburg. After high school, she studied geography in Hamburg and in 1992 transferred to LMU Munich. It was while studying in Munich when she fell in love with the mountains and discovered her passion for climbing and ski mountaineering. In Munich, she also met Luis Stitzinger, who would become her partner in ski mountaineering and in life.

In 2001, she joined her partner on an expedition to Aconcagua that he was leading as a mountain guide. On that trip, she would become the first German woman to climb Aconcagua when she reached the summit via the south face. The experience led her to want to climb more. She climbed Muztagata the next year.

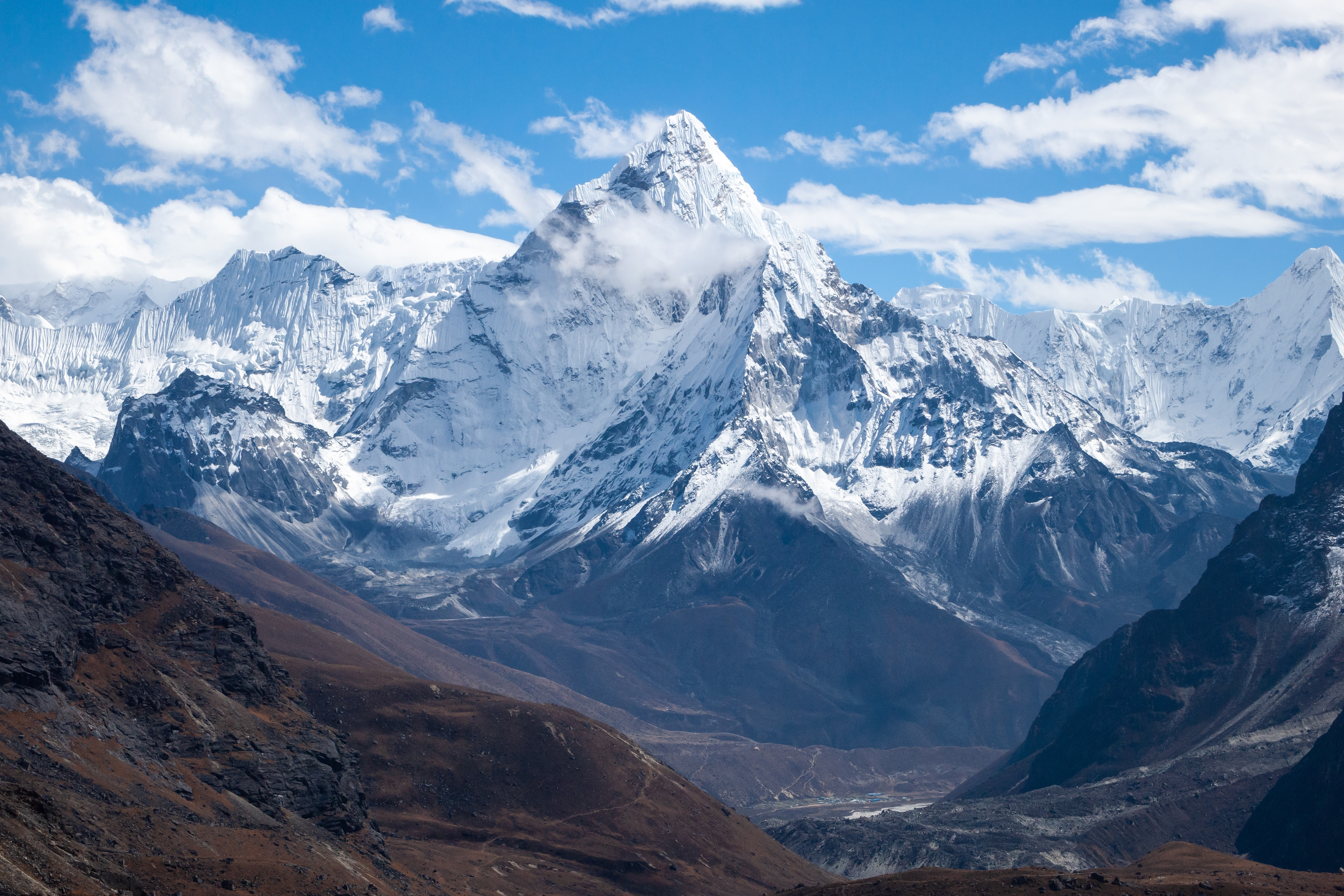
Ama Dablam, Himalayas, where von Melle was the first German woman to summit

After university, she spent a decade managing the Bavarian regional office of the German Alpine Club while Stitzinger was a mountain guide. Over twenty-five years together, the two became Germany's most high profile mountaineering couples, and would climb many of the world's highest peaks together.

In 2004, von Melle climbed Ama Dablam via the southwest ridge, as well as Huascaran Norte. In 2005, she reached the summit of Denali. In 2006, alongside Luis, von Melle summitted her first eight-thousander, Gasherbrum II. The next year, she reached the summit of Lenin Peak.

Stitzinger and von Melle married in 2011.

Later she managed the press and public relations department of Globetrotter, a German sporting goods retailer before becoming a self-employed PR consultant. In 2014, after an unsuccessful summit of Makalu, due to altitude sickness, she climbed Kilimanjaro to recover.

== Notable ascents ==
Date	Mountain	Height (m)	Route	Notes
29 June 2006	Gasherbrum II	8.034	Southwest Spur (III), Banana-Ridge	
21 June 2008	Nanga Parbat	8,125	Kinshofer Route (V)	Together with Helga Söll, second German woman at the summit
18 May 2009	Dhaulagiri	8,167	Northeast Ridge (II)	Together with Helga Söll, second German woman at the summit
May 2010	Makalu	8,485	French Route	Turned back at 8050m due to cold
2 October 2010	Cho Oyu	8,188	Tichy-Route	
25 July 2011	Broad Peak	8,051	West ridge and west flank	
May 2012	Manaslu	8,163	Northeast flank and northeast ridge	Turned back at 7990m due to thunderstorm
1 May 2012	Shishapangma	8,027	North ridge	
May 2014	Makalu	8,485	French route	Turned back at 8250m due to altitude sickness
April – June 2015	Mount Everest	8,848		Unsuccessful due to 2015 Nepal Earthquake
30 September 2017	Manaslu	8,163	Northeast flank and northwest ridge	

In 2023, her husband and climbing partner Luis Stizinger died while climbing Kangchenjunga in Nepal. Despite her loss, she has continued to climb and return to the mountains.

== Literature ==
- Gaby Funk: Alix von Melle & Luis Stitzinger – Ein Paar mit gemeinsamer Leidenschaft fürs Hohe (PDF; 849 kB). In: DAV Panorama – Magazin des Deutschen Alpenvereins. 65. Jahrgang, Nr. 4, 2013, ISSN 1437-5923, S. 92–97.

== Writing ==
- Leidenschaft fürs Leben. Together with Luis Stitzinger. Malik-Verlag, München/Berlin 2015, ISBN 978-3-89029-442-1.
