= Youngs Peak =

Mountain in Colorado, USA

- C Hill
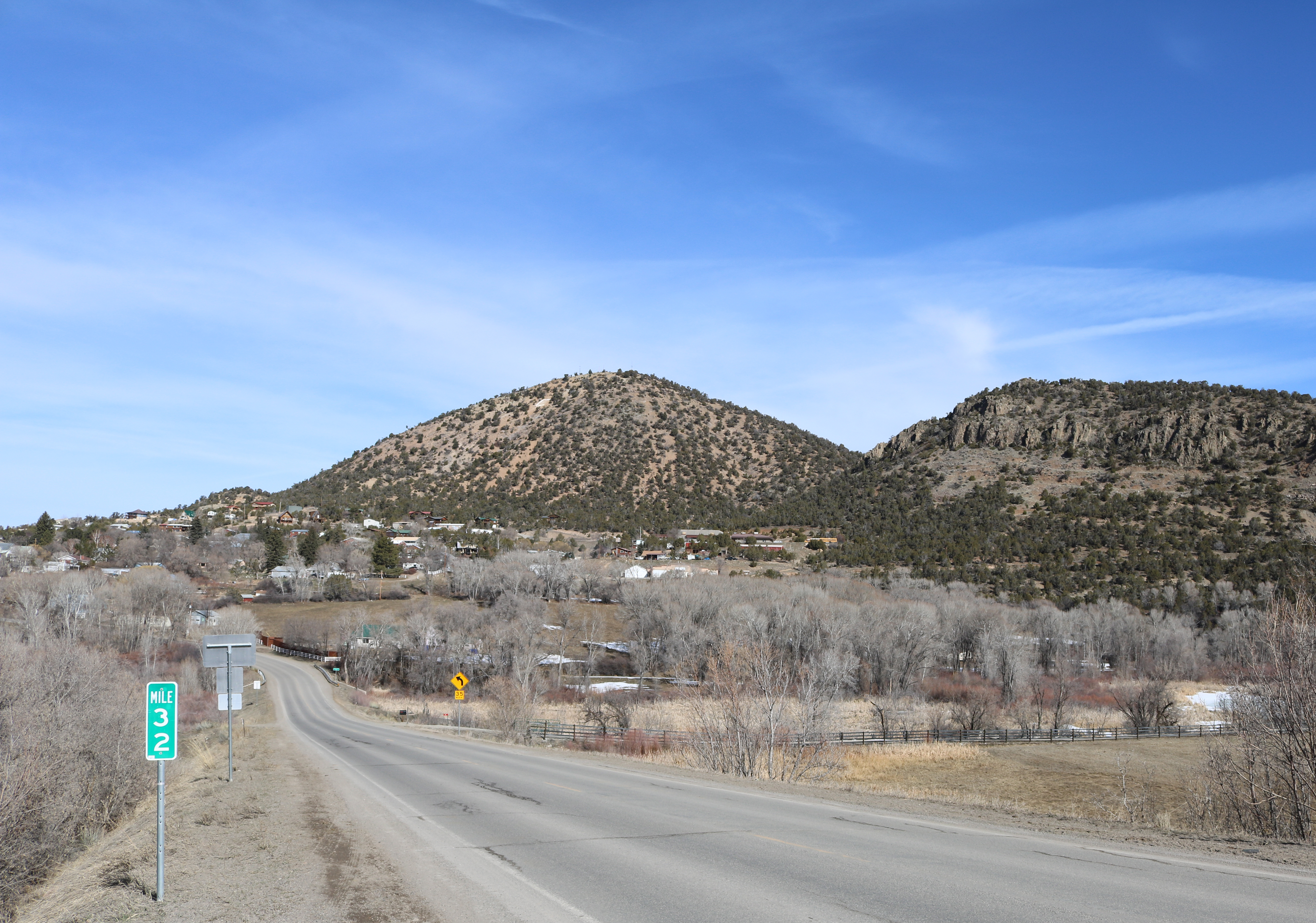
- Youngs Peak is the mountain on the left

Highest point
- Elevation: 7,424 ft (2,263 m)
- Prominence: 600 ft (180 m)
- Parent peak: Needle Rock
- Isolation: 3.13 mi (5.04 km)
- Coordinates: 38°42′41″N 107°36′23″W

Geography
- Location within Colorado
- Location: Delta County, Colorado, United States
- Parent range: West Elk Mountains
- Topo map(s): USGS 7.5' topographic map Crawford, Colorado

Youngs Peak is a small mountain located on the western side of the West Elk Mountains just east of and overlooking Crawford, Colorado. It has an elevation of 7,424 ft (2,263 m) with about 600 ft (180 m) of vertical relief above the town below. Although much of the mountain is covered with sedimentary rocks, Saddle Mountain is an exposed igneous intrusion that geologists call a laccolith.

The summit of Youngs Peak can be accessed by a hiking trail or by a four-wheel drive road. The top offers 360 degree views of the surrounding area with Needle Rock and the West Elk Mountains to the east, Crawford State Park to the south, the Black Canyon uplift and Gunnison Gorge National Conservation Area to the east, and Grand Mesa and North Fork of the Gunnison River valley to the north.
