= Urdok Glacier =

Karakoram glacier

- Baltoro Muztagh
- Interactive map of Urdok Glacier
- Location: Xinjiang (China)
- Coordinates: 35°46′00″N 76°45′45″E
- Length: 24-27 km
- Highest elevation: 5,800 m
- Lowest elevation: 4,300 m

The Urdok Glacier is found in the eastern Karakoram along the Shaksgam Valley or Trans-Karakoram Tract.

It separates the Siachen Muztagh in the east from the Baltoro Muztagh in the west. In the west and south, the glacier is framed by Gasherbrum I (8,068 m), Sia Kangri (7,422 m) and Urdok I (7,250 m). Runoff from the Urdok Glacier ultimately flows into the Shaksgam River.

The Urdok Glacier is largely covered by rock debris, which slows snowmelt. Despite the presence of climate change, research has found that ice cliffs were growing in size on Urdok Glacier, compared to other glaciers in the region. The Urdok Glacier is additionally characterized as a "surge-type" or "surge-modified" glacier, where its speed can increase rapidly. The variability in the glacier's depth and speed has resulted in varying measurements in the glacier's overall length and size. Various figures have measured its length to be 24 km, 25 km or 27 km.

The Urdok Glacier has been known to exhibit "ice sails", a geological feature that appears as a sharp ridge or spike of melting ice protruding from the glacier surface. Also known as "ice pyramids" the feature has been documented across the Urdok Glacier in 2006 and 2014.
