= Dominique Perret =

Swiss free ride skier and ski safety specialist

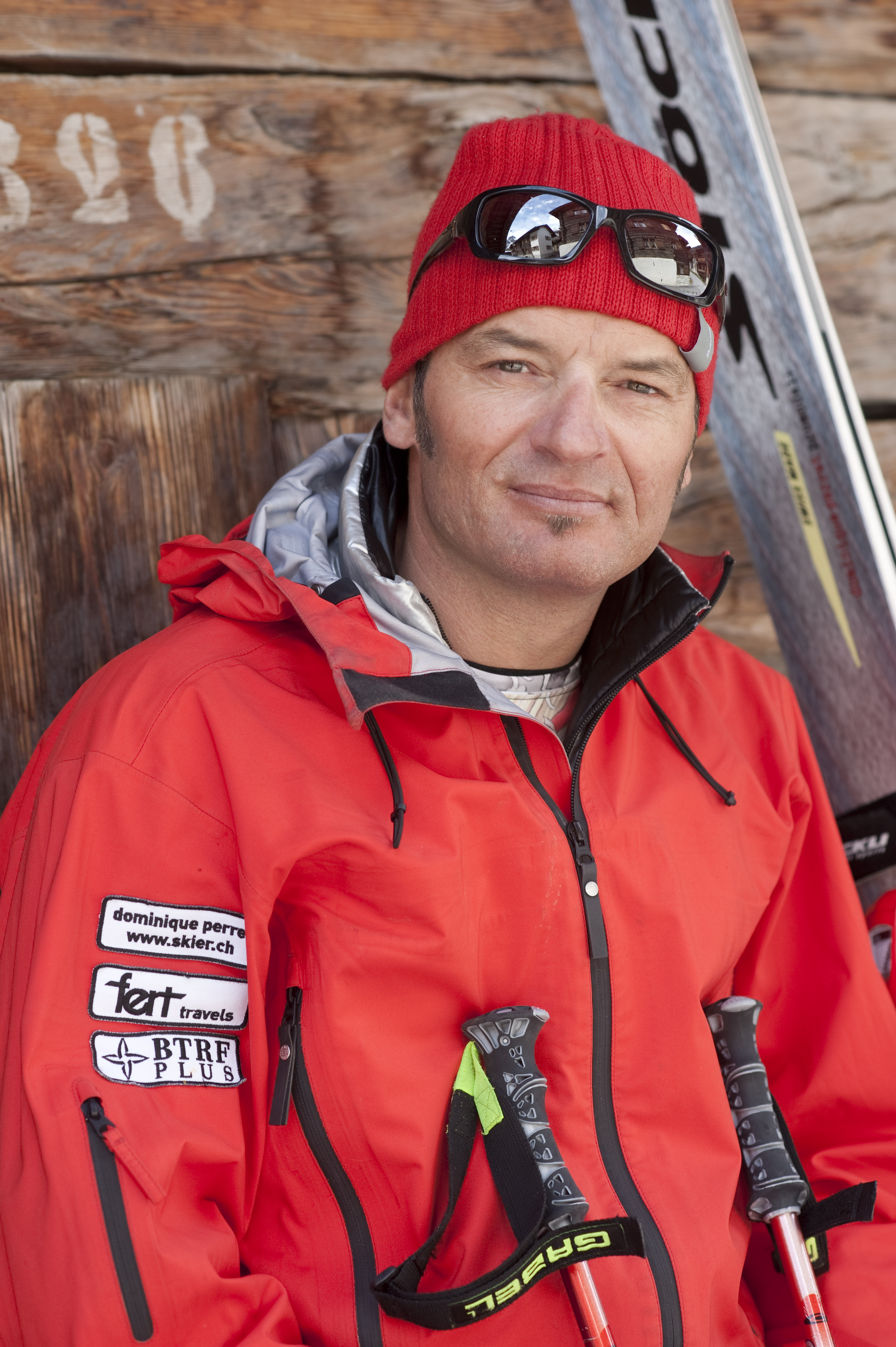

Personal information
- Born: 20 November 1962 (age 63) La Chaux-de-Fonds, Switzerland
- Education: Master's degree, mechanical engineering
- Occupation: Ski safety specialist
- Height: 6 ft 0 in (183 cm)
- Weight: 198 lb (90 kg; 14 st 2 lb)
- Other interests: Ski and avalanche safety

Sport
- Sport: Free-ride skiing

Dominique Perret (born 20 November 1962 in La Chaux-de-Fonds) is a Swiss freeride skier, filmmaker and ski safety pioneer. He gained notoriety for skiing mountains that had been deemed "un-skiable" and was named the "best freeride skier of the century" at the 2000 Paris Board Awards. In 2014 he founded the International Snow Training Academy, an organization dedicated to avalanche safety and awareness.

== Background ==
Perret was born into a family of skiers, growing up less than 500m from ski lift. Perret began skiing at age 2, spending the next fifteen years developing a technical skillset on skis following the Swiss development system. His father Louis-Charles Perret was a Swiss Olympic skier and contemporary of Jean Vuarnet, the Olympic gold medalist ski racer. Rather than following their footsteps into competition, Perret wanted to ski and have the freedom to practice his technique, innovating as a freeride skier. Soon he began sharing his exploits in the new medium of ski films.

=== Free-ride skiing and filmmaking ===
In 1985, he moved to Chamonix, and set up his own film production company. In his films, he would seek out new routes and locations for long and steep lines.

In 1990, he made a world record 120-foot (36.40 m) cliff jump on skis in Champéry, Switzerland while completing a downhill run. In 1991, he reached 131 miles per hour/ 211.825 km/h on skis at a ski racing track in Portillo, Chile. It was the world's seventh fastest time on skis at the time.

In 1996, Dominique Perret takes part in an expedition with Jean Troillet to make the first ski descent from the North Face of Mount Everest from the Tibetan side in alpine style, without sherpas or oxygen. After three months and three attempts at more than 8,000m descents, they make their Everest descent from 27,887 feet/ 8,500m.

Two years later in 1998 he set a world record for ski endurance, travelling 353,600 feet / 120,000 m across 75 runs in 14 hours. The record took place at the Mike Wiegele Heli Resort, Canada.

Despite the altitude and distance of some of his ski descents, including a descent from Mount Everest, Perret did not consider himself an extreme skier or ski mountaineer. Instead, Perret focused more on speed and snow quality for his descents, where "the voyage is important, to ski and experience where there is snow".

Through his films, Perret became a prominent face of European skiing, appearing as a ski model, appearing in multiple television specials and earning an estimated million dollars a year at the height of his career. In 2000 he was named "best freeride skier of the century" by journalists and the skiing community at the Board Awards in Paris. In 2004, US magazine « Skiing » names him one of the 12 « stars » to change the sport. Perret would film ski films for 28 years, making his last film at age 50.

=== International Snow Training Academy ===
After retiring from ski films, he turned his attention to ski safety. Looking back at his career, he counted thirty friends that had died in avalanches. Perret has warned that "around 200 individuals lose their lives every year in avalanches, which are triggered in 90% of cases by the victim or a member of their group."

In 2014, after 75 skiers were killed in avalanches, Perret developed and launched the International Snow Training Academy (ISTA), a ski education platform to improve snow safety. The organization promotes respect of nature and safety on the mountain to prevent avalanche casualties, and involves a certification program, inspired by PADI's dive certification. The system standardizes awareness and aims to ensure backcountry enthusiasts focus on prevention of avalanches, alongside recovery. The ISTA system for avalanche awareness is now implemented at resorts in Europe and North America.

== Films ==
- Home Swiss Home, 2010 (Switzerland)
- White Noise, 2008 (Alaska)
- 16 Hours in Alyeska, 2007 (Alaska)
- Versus, 2006 (Turkey)
- Kaçkar Sugar, 2005 (Turkey)
- Red Alert 2004 (Swiss Alps)
- Namasté 2003 (Himachal, India)
- Origin 2002 (Yukon & Canada)
- Timeless 2001 (Norway)
- Y2sKi 2000 (Switzerland)
- Soul Pilot 1999 (Alaska)
- Just in Powder 1998 (Canada)
- Speed is my Friend 1997 (compilation)
- Natural Born Skier 1996 (France)
- Alp Fiction 1995 (Suisse)
- Edelweiss Powder 1994 (Suisse)
- Rocky's Rock 1993 (Canada)
- Go East 1992 (USSR)
- Perret-stroika 1991 (Uzbekistan, the first foreign-produced ski film shot in the former USSR)
- C'est Tout Bon 1990 (Canada)

== Publications ==
- 1995, The Extreme Skier, ISBN 978-2940125074
- 2003, Dominique Perret - Lignes de pente (Adventure Skier) ISBN 978-2828907464
