= Hidden Glacier =

Glacier in Montana, United States

- Location within Montana
- Type: Mountain glacier
- Location: Beartooth Mountains, Park County, Montana, U.S.
- Coordinates: 45°09′08″N 109°50′23″W
- Area: Approximately 10 acres (0.040 km^{2})
- Terminus: Barren rock
- Status: Unknown

Hidden Glacier is located in the US state of Montana. The glacier is situated in the Beartooth Mountains at an elevation of 10,500 feet (3,200 m), nestled within a cirque between Mount Villard to the east and Glacier Peak to the west. The glacier covers approximately 10 acres (0.040 km^{2}).

== See also ==
- List of glaciers in the United States
