= Flor Cuenca =

Peruvian mountaineer

Graciela Flor Cuenca Blas
- Born: 1977 (age 48–49); Chuspin, Peru
- Occupations: Mountaineer, tour guide, Spanish teacher
- Known for: Summitting 11 eight-thousanders

Flor "Hirkawarmi" Cuenca is a Peruvian climber. She is the first Peruvian woman to have reached the summit of 11 eight-thousanders without supplemental oxygen. She is the first Peruvian to have climbed Gasherbrum I (8068 m), K2 (8611 m) and Kanchenjunga (8586 m).

== Background ==
Flor Cuenca was born in Chuspín, Casca District. She is the third of 14 children, born into a farming family, where she had to climb 1,000m to tend her family's sheep. Growing up in the Ancash region of the Andes, she made her first summit of 4,500m at "7 or 8" years old.

She moved to Lima to train as a tourist guide at the Instituto Superior Tecnológico Eleazar Guzmán Barrón in Huaraz, as she felt it would be the right career to help her stay close to the mountains. In 2006, she moved to Europe on a student visa to learn German. She decided to stay in Germany as she could earn enough income to self-fund her expeditions, which was not possible in Peru. Since 2008, she has been living in Karlsruhe, Germany, and is a member of the German Alpine Club.

She is also known as "Hirkawarmi", which is Ancash Quechua for "mountain woman".

=== Mountaineering ===
Flor is known for her lean expeditions, self-funded, without sherpas, sponsorship and without supplemental oxygen.

She is critical of large expeditions that leave garbage, waste, old tents and used O2 canisters across the Himalayas and Karakoram, and has sought to bring attention to the issue. In 2025, when two Nepali sherpas were killed in an avalanche while ferrying oxygen containers on Annapurna, Cuenca was openly critical of conditions that the sherpas were working in, which cost their lives. Writing on Instagram, she said, "In every expedition in the Himalaya, in every accident, there are always the Sherpas who pay with their lives… They die serving people, opening routes, and carrying equipment up and down for tourists. If we go back in history, many have also died due to the negligence, stubbornness, or selfishness of their clients."

=== Summits of eight-thousanders ===
Summit	Country	Altitude	Year	Notes
Cho Oyu	Tibet / Nepal	8201 m	2016	First 8 thousander
Manaslu	Nepal	8163 m	2017	
Broad Peak	Pakistan / China	8051 m	2019	
Gasherbrum	Pakistan / China	8068 m	2021	First Peruvian ascent summit on Peru's bicentennial
Dhaulagiri	Nepal	8167 m	2021	
K2	Pakistan / China	8611 m	2022	First Peruvian ascent
Kanchenjunga	India / Nepal	8586 m	2023	First Peruvian ascent
Nanga Parbat	Pakistan	8125 m	2023	
Gasherbrum II	Pakistan / China	8035 m	2023	
Annapurna	Nepal	8091 m	2024	
Makalu	Tíbet / Nepal	8485 m	2024	

She started the project "Hijas de la Montaña" in an effort to lead the first Peruvian female expedition in the Himalayas. The project, aims to send five women from the Peruvian Andes, including Flor, to climb Manaslu and advocate for environmental sustainability and gender equality. The project plans to bring more than 100 kg of trash down from base camp during the expedition.

In 2023, she was named to the Forbes 50 Most Powerful Women in Peru List.

== See also ==
- Luis Stitzinger
- Silvia Vásquez-Lavado
