= Glacier Peak (Park County, Montana) =

Mountain in Montana, United States

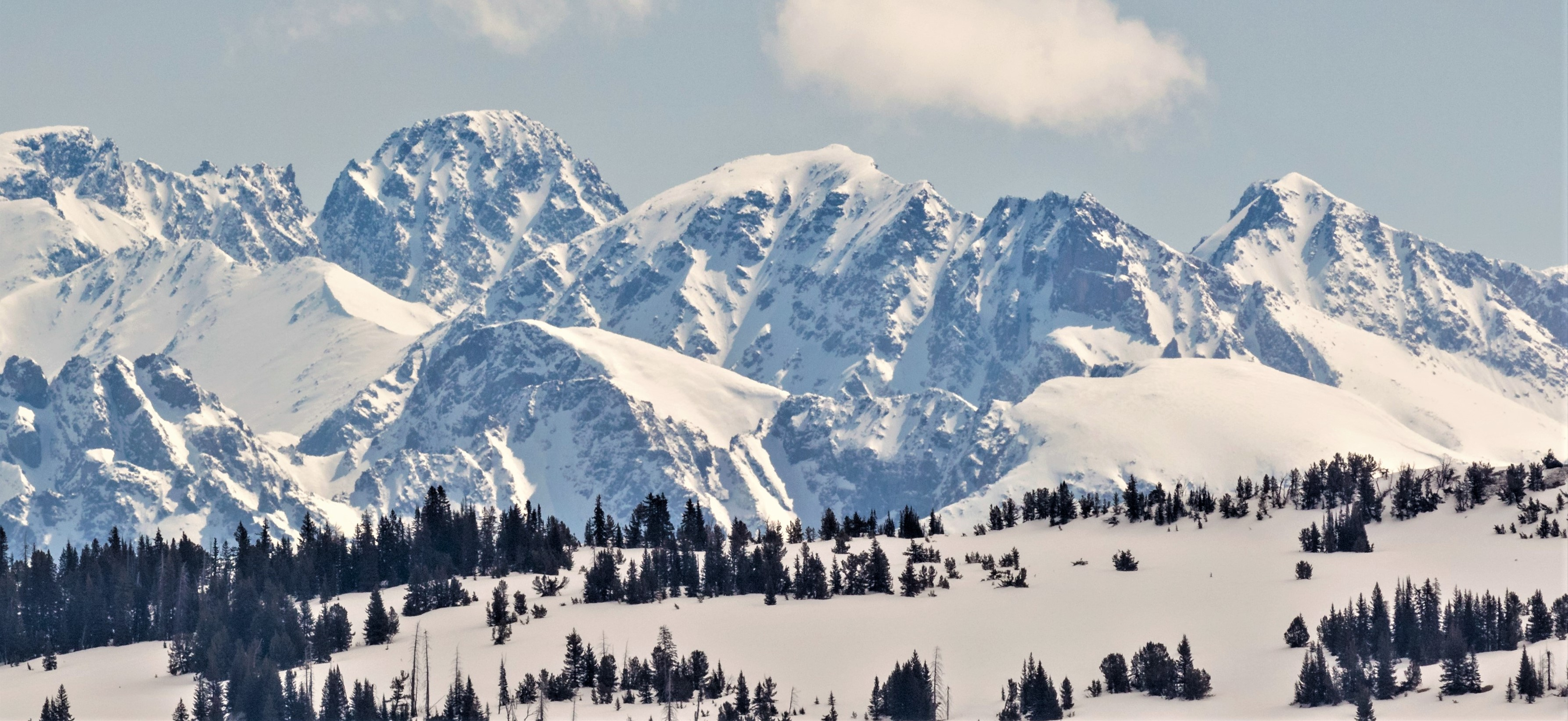
- Glacier Peak in the center, Mount Villard (right), Granite Peak (highest in Montana) to left. Camera pointed east.

Highest point
- Elevation: 12,320 ft (3,760 m)
- Prominence: 800 ft (240 m)
- Coordinates: 45°08′59″N 109°50′58″W

Geography
- Location within Montana Location within the United States
- Location: Park County, Montana, U.S.
- Parent range: Beartooth Mountains
- Topo map: USGS Granite Peak

Glacier Peak (12,320 feet (3,760 m) to 12,360 ft (3,770 m)) is in the Beartooth Mountains in the U.S. state of Montana. The peak is one of the tallest in the Beartooth Mountains and is in the Absaroka-Beartooth Wilderness, on the border of Custer and Gallatin National Forests.
