= Tormod Granheim =

Norwegian ski mountaineer

Tormod Granheim (born September 17, 1974, in Trondheim, Norway) is a Norwegian adventurer and motivational speaker involved in expeditions and extreme skiing. On May 16, 2006, he made the first ski descent of Mount Everest's North Face by the Norton Couloir.

== Skiing Mount Everest ==
Tormod Granheim, his Swedish partner Tomas Olsson and photographer Fredrik Schenholm approached Everest from the Tibetan side in Spring 2006. Granheim climbed the mountain from Advanced Base Camp (6400 meters above sea level) to the summit (8848 m) in a continuous 24‑hour effort, meeting Olsson en route, who spent two days covering the same ground. The route they followed, known as the Mallory route normally takes climbers five days to complete. The pair then skied into the North Face by the Norton Couloir, a 55 degree steep and nearly 3000 meter high mountain face. Near the top Olsson's ski broke, adding extra tension to the already complex task. A cliff intersecting the couloir forced the two to make an abseil. A snow anchor failed and Olsson fell an estimated 2500 meters to his death. Granheim skied alone to the North Col.

The accident led the team to arrange the first helicopter rescue on the Tibetan side of Mount Everest.

== North-Atlantic reed boat crossing ==
On July 11, 2007, Tormod Granheim set out from New York City on the reed boat Abora3, captained by German scientist Dominique Görlitz. The mission was to prove inter-continental sea-journeys were possible with technology available even before the ice-age. He and his crew were met and transferred to another boat on August 25 after the stern of their raft was damaged.

== All 82 4000 Meter Summits in the Alps ==
Tormod Granheim is the first climber from the nordic countries to summit all summits higher than 4000 meters in the Alps according to the UIAA List of Alpine four-thousanders. The final summit was Weisshorn climbed August 29. 2016. This achievement won him the Adventurer of the Year award in Norway.

== Works by Granheim ==
- På ski fra EVEREST, 2006
- SPOR, 2009
- Alpenes 4000-metere, 2017
