= Needle Rock Natural Area =

Mountain in United States of America

Needle Rock
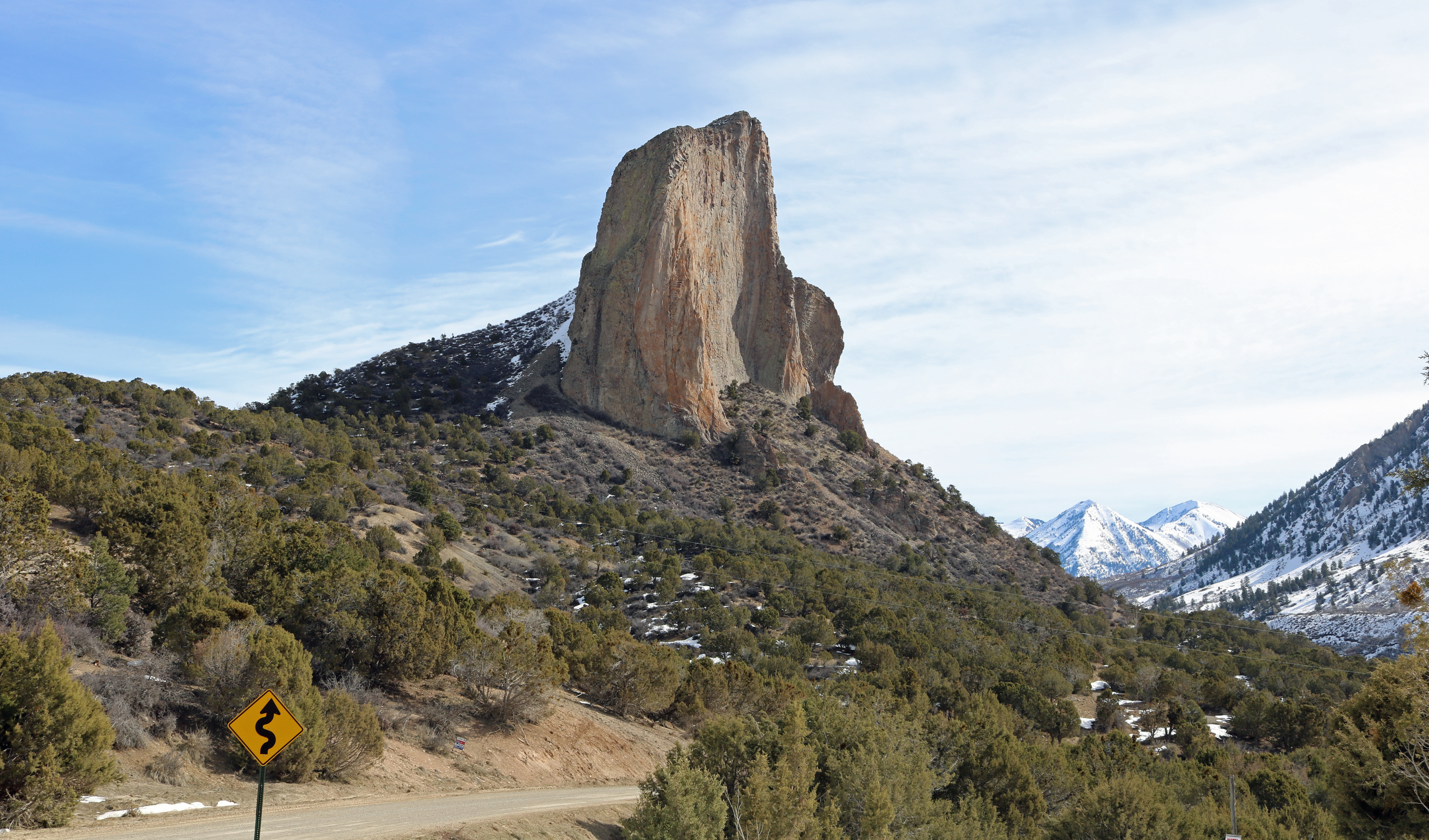
- Needle Rock in 2016.

Highest point
- Elevation: 7,797 ft (2,377 m)
- Coordinates: 38°43′28″N 107°33′00″W

Geography
- Location within Colorado
- Location: Delta County, Colorado, U.S.
- Parent range: West Elk Mountains
- Topo map(s): USGS 7.5' topographic map Crawford, Colorado

Geology
- Rock age: c.a. 28 Ma
- Mountain type: Igneous Intrusion

Climbing
- Easiest route: rock

Needle Rock Natural Area is located at the western edge of the West Elk Mountains of Colorado. The surrounding terrain is characterized by laccolithic mountains flanked by precipitous cliffs, extensive talus aprons, forested mesas, canyons, and spacious, well-watered intermontane basins. Needle Rock is an intrusive plug of monzonite porphyry cropping out 3.5 miles (5.6 km) east-northeast (bearing 68°) of the Town of Crawford in Delta County, Colorado, United States. With an elevation of 7,797 feet (2,377 m), the towering rock spire stands 800 feet (240 m) tall above the floor of the Smith Fork of the Gunnison River valley. The massive rock feature originated in the Oligocene geological epoch when magma intruded between existing sedimentary rocks as the crown of a buried laccolith or possibly the underlying conduit of a laccolith. Subsequent erosion has exposed the prominent rock formation seen in the natural area today.

The Needle Rock Natural Area is managed by the Bureau of Land Management.

== See also ==
- West Elk Mountains
- List of Colorado mountain ranges
- List of Colorado mountain summits
  - List of Colorado fourteeners
  - List of Colorado 4000 meter prominent summits
  - List of the most prominent summits of Colorado
- List of Colorado county high points
