= Sebastian Haag =

German ski mountaineer and skier (1978–2014)

Sebastian Haag (23 May 1978 – 24 September 2014) was a German extreme ski mountaineer and extreme skier. Together with Benedikt Böhm he holds the records in speed ski mountaineering at the Muztagata and the Gasherbrum II.

Haag was born in Munich, where he worked as a veterinarian, and was a member of the Dynafit Gore-Tex team.

Haag died on 24 September 2014 together with the Italian mountaineer Andrea Zambaldi at the Shishapangma in an avalanche accident. He was 36.

== Selected results ==
- speed record in high altitude mountaineering with downhill skiing at the Muztagata together with Benedikt Böhm under the leadership of Matthias Robl, 23 August 2005
- speed record in high altitude mountaineering with downhill skiing at the Gasherbrum II together with Benedikt Böhm under the leadership of Luis Stitzinger, 3 August 2006
