= Luis Stitzinger =

German ski mountaineer

Luis Andreas Stitzinger
- Born: December 16, 1968; Füssen, Allgäu, Germany
- Died: May 25, 2023 (aged 54); Kangchenjunga, Nepal
- Cause of death: High altitude cerebral edema and exhaustion
- Body discovered: 8400 m
- Resting place: Putha Hiunchuli
- Education: Technical University of Munich, LMU Munich
- Occupation: Mountain guide
- Known for: 10 summits of eight-thousanders, 7 ski descents of eight-thousanders, first ski descent of Gasherbrum
- Spouse: Alix von Melle (2011-his death)
- Website: https://www.goclimbamountain.de/

Luis Andreas Stitzinger (born 16 December 1968 – 25 May 2023) was a German ski mountaineer, alpinist, and mountain guide. Stitzinger was one of the most prominent big mountain skiers of his generation, known for his ten successful summits of eight-thousanders, and ski descents of seven of them.

== Background ==
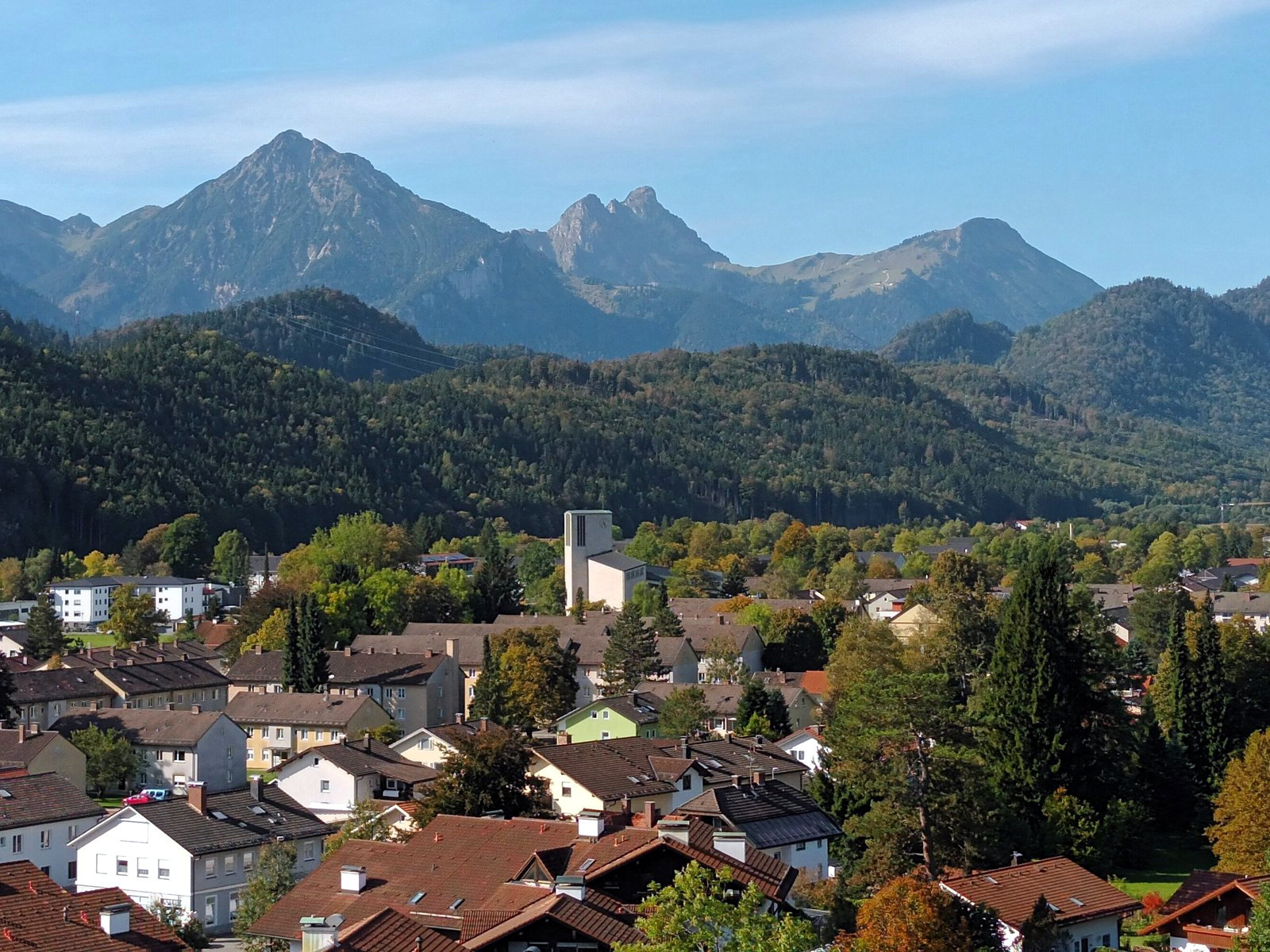
Stitzinger's home of Füssen, with the Allgäu Alps in the background.

Stitzinger grew up in Halblech in Ostallgäu. He was said to have been "born with skis on his feet" and was the son of Volkmar Stitzinger, a prominent mountain guide and pioneer of the local German Alpine Club. At university, he studied Sports Science at the Technical University of Munich and later studied English at LMU Munich. During his studies, he became a state certified mountain and ski guide. It was at university where he met fellow mountaineer Alix von Melle, with whom he would climb six eight-thousanders together, including Broad Peak, Manaslu and Shishapangma. The two would marry in 2011.

From 1998 to 2003, Stitzinger worked for the Munich section of the German Alpine Club as the head of the mountaineering department, library, and managed equipment rental. Then from 2004 to 2012 he led expeditions and extreme mountaineering for the DAV Summit Club program, a subsidiary of the German Alpine Association focusing on hiking, trekking, climbing, mountaineering, ski touring, snowshoeing, and cycling trips across the globe.

In 2013, he started Go Climb A Mountain in Füssen, and became self-employed as a professional mountaineer.

== Mountaineering ==
Throughout his career, Stitzinger summited 10 8,000-meter peaks, some of these multiple times. He became known for his ski descents, including a number of first descents of the world's tallest mountains.

=== Expeditions ===
2000 Cho Oyu (8188 m) leading the German Alpine Club DAV Summit Club-Autumn Expedition.

2006 Gasherbrum II (8034 m) leading the German Alpine Club DAV Summit Club-Expedition, in which all nine participants reached the summit. After a day of rest at the base camp, Stitzinger, accompanied by Benedikt Böhm and Sebastian Haag set off again to the summit, reaching it in 12 hours and 30 minutes from base camp (5900 m). There, the three made a successful first complete ski descent, negotiating sections of over 50 degrees. The three returned safely to base camp after a 17-hour round trip.

2008 Nanga Parbat (8125 m) leading the German Alpine Club DAV Summit Club-Expedition, in which six of seven participants reached the summit on 21 May. After the successful climb, Josef Lunger and Stitzinger stayed on the mountain a little longer to try to traverse the 10 km long Mazeno Ridge to the summit of Nanga Parbat. They managed to climb Mazeno Peak (7,145 m) for the second time. Before reaching the Mazeno Col (6940 m), they had to stop after seven days of climbing due to running out of food supplies, where they descended back to base camp via Reinhold Messner's solo route (1978). After a few days of rest, Stitzinger set off again alone towards the summit and made the first ski descent from Nanga Parbat on the central Diamir flank from 300 meters below the summit. After 24.5 hours he returned to base camp.

2009 Dhaulagiri (8167 m) again leading the German Alpine Club DAV Summit Club-Expedition, eight out of ten participants – reached the summit. The planned ski descent failed due to bad weather, but Stitzinger successfully made the first ski descent of nearby Tukuche Peak (6920 m).

2010 Makalu (8485 m) again leading the German Alpine Club DAV Summit Club Stitzinger had to abandon his summit attempt at 8,050 m due to the extreme cold.

2011 Broad Peak (8051 m) und K2 (8611 m). After leading the DAV Summit Club expedition to Broad Peak, Stitzinger and his wife Alix von Melle successfully summited around 2 p.m. on 25 July. Stitzinger then skied from the highest point possible, the Col at 7,850 m, to the base of the wall. A short time later, Stitzinger and about a dozen other mountaineers reached the “shoulder” of K2 (approx. 8000 m) on 5 August. The climbers had to abandon their summit attempt due to worsening weather and all climbers descended back to base camp. On 6 August Stitzinger then skied down from Camp 4 (7900 m) via the Kukuczka route to the base of the wall - the first ski descent on this line and the longest ski descent on K2 at the time.

2012 Manaslu (8163 m). Stitzinger and his wife Alix von Melle abandoned their summit attempt just 180m from the summit due to avalanche risk.

2013 Shishapangma (8027 m). Von Melle and Stitzer climbed the world's smallest of the eight-thousanders in April 2013. Stitzinger skied from a launch site 50 meters below the main summit, to the end of the Shishapangma glacier at about 5700 m.

2014 Kokodak Dome (7129 m) As part of the Amical Alpin team, Stitzinger was one of the first successful summiteers of this yet unclimbed mountain.

2015 A planned trip to summit Mt. Everest was cancelled after the 2015 Nepal earthquake.

2017 Manaslu (8163 m). Alongside his wife, Alix von Melle, Stitzinger successfully summited on 30 September.

2018 Gasherbrum I (8080 m). Alongside climbing partner Gianpaolo Corona, Stitzinger summited on 18 July without the use of additional oxygen after an unsuccessful summit attempt on Urdok II. Stitzinger then skied down from the summit to just above base camp, with two interruptions (descent on foot approx. 7500 to 7100 m due to darkness and Japanese Couloir 7200 to 6500 m due to the risk of avalanches).

2019 Mount Everest (8848 m). Stitzinger summited Everest on 24 May, while serving as an expedition leader for an international group of climbers. All members successfully reached the summit, using supplemental oxygen.

2022 Mount Everest (8848 m). On 13 May Stitzinger summited Everest for the second time, this time climbing from the Southern route. On this trip, he served a mountain guide and expedition leader for Graham Keene, who at 68, was the oldest Briton to climb Mount Everest.

2023 Kangchenjunga (8586 m). Climbing solo, Stitzinger reached the summit on 25 May without using bottled oxygen. He would not make it off the mountain.

=== Final climb ===
After his successful summit on 25 May 2023, Stitzinger was lost on Kangchenjunga (8586 m). On his way to the summit, he asked mountaineer Flor Cuenca to wait for him at camp 4, as she was descending from the summit. She waited, but he never arrived. His last radio contact was around 9 p.m., inaccurately reporting he was at an altitude of 8,200 or 8,300 meters and would reach Camp IV in just over two hours. Five days later, his body was found at an altitude of 8,400 meters. He had not reached his skis for the planned descent. It was his tenth eight-thousander.

On 1 June his body was removed from the mountain, in accordance with a new law requiring bodies that are found to be removed. An autopsy later revealed that he had suffered from altitude sickness.

In 2024, Stitzinger's widow Alix von Melle returned Stitzinger's ashes to the Himalaya in accordance with his wishes. His ashes were scattered on Putha Hiunchuli, a mountain he had previous summited in 2021, and appreciated for its remote and lonely aspect.

== Literature ==
- Gaby Funk: Alix von Melle & Luis Stitzinger – Ein Paar mit gemeinsamer Leidenschaft fürs Hohe (PDF; 829 kB). In: DAV Panorama, Nr. 4/2013, ISSN 1437-5923, S. 92–97
- Evamaria Wecker and Luis Stitzinger: Bergtouren mit Bus & Bahn, Bayerische Alpen, Verlag Geobuch, Munich, 2002 ISBN 3-925308-09-1
