= Mount Villard =

Mountain in the U.S. state of Montana

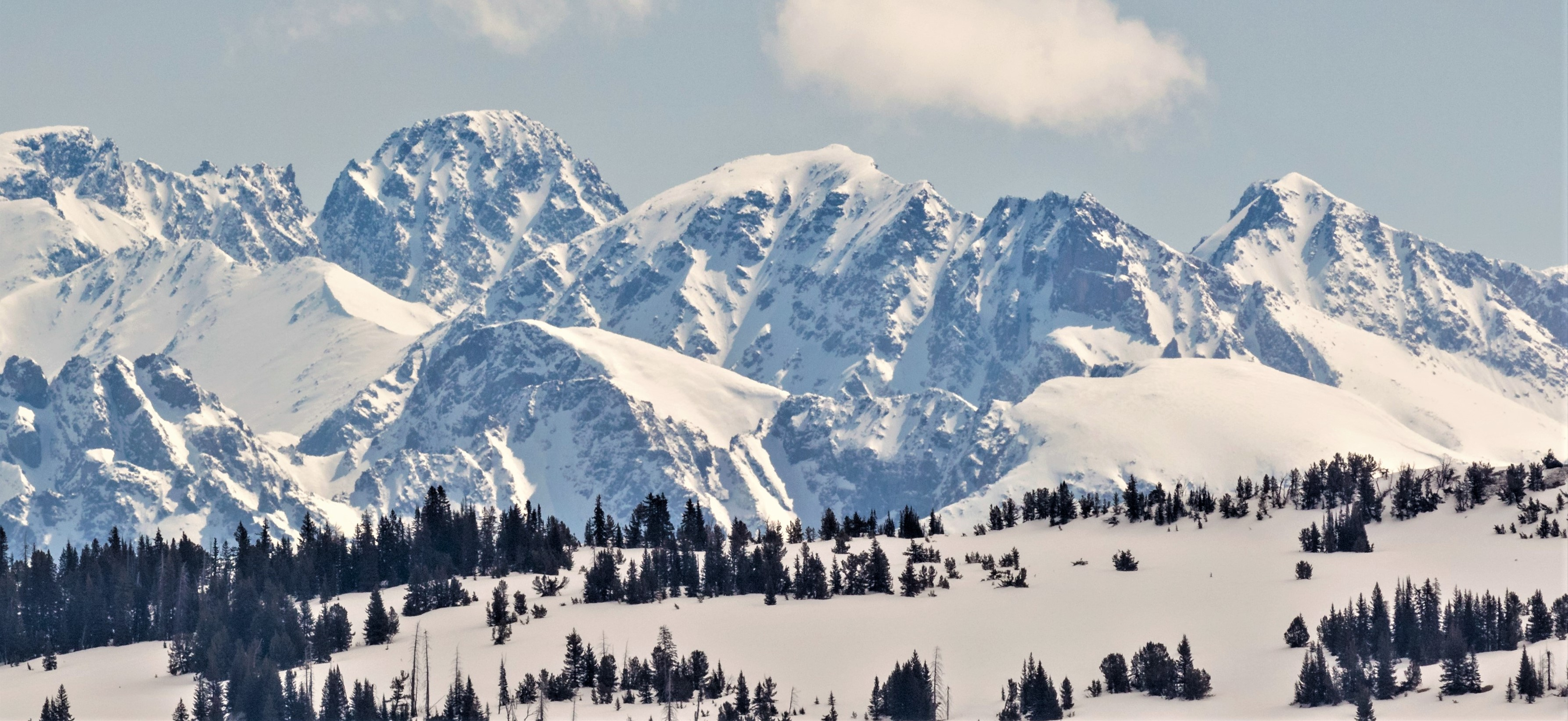
- Mount Villard (right), Granite Peak (highest in Montana) to left, Glacier Peak in the center. Camera pointed east.

Highest point
- Elevation: 12,350 ft (3,760 m)
- Prominence: 545 ft (166 m)
- Coordinates: 45°08′58″N 109°49′56″W

Geography
- Location within Montana Location within the United States
- Location: Park County, Montana, U.S.
- Parent range: Beartooth Mountains
- Topo map: USGS Granite Peak

Mount Villard (12,350 feet (3,760 m)) is in the Beartooth Mountains in the U.S. state of Montana. The peak is one of the tallest in the Beartooth Mountains and is in the Absaroka-Beartooth Wilderness on the border of Custer and Gallatin National Forests. Hidden Glacier lies to the northwest of the peak.
