= Kit DesLauriers =

American ski-mountaineer and mountain climber (born 1969)

Kit DesLauriers (born 1969) is an American ski-mountaineer who was the first person to ski down the Seven Summits. Her ski-mountaineering feats earned her a National Geographic Adventurer of the Year award in 2015. She was the first woman to have won two consecutive World Freeskiing Champion titles, in 2004 and 2005.

== Early life ==
DesLauriers was born in Albany, New York and grew up in Westport, Massachusetts and Long Island, New York. Her grandfather built the first chairlift at Stowe Mountain in Vermont. Prior to starting high school, her family moved to Arizona.

DesLauriers graduated from the University of Arizona with a degree in environmental political science, where she took up trail running and rock climbing. While pursuing her college degree in Arizona, DesLauriers also obtained a scholarship from the National Outdoor Leadership School and in the summer of 1991, DesLauriers spent a semester in Alaska. During college, she also modeled for a while so she could travel to Europe and further her ski skills, especially at Verbier. After college, she moved to Telluride, Colorado, where she lived for nearly ten years. She also spent much time in Indian Creek, Utah. In Telluride, she volunteered extensively with the San Miguel County Search and Rescue Team and also worked for the ski patrol at Telluride Ski Resort for two seasons, during which time she became a certified EMT and highly trained in technical and helicopter rescue.

== Freeskiing ==
DesLauriers is a two-time women's world freeskiing champion, winning back-to-back titles in 2004 and 2005 after only two years of competition. In August 2005, she won the women's division of the Rendezvous Hill Climb to the top of the Jackson Hole Mountain Resort.

== Ski-mountaineering ==
The idea for the Seven Summits adventure was visualized during DesLauriers' time on the freeskiing circuit. The initial notion came from a 2005 meeting with Richard Bass, the first person to climb all of the peaks. DesLauriers is the first woman to climb and ski Mount Aspiring/Tititea in New Zealand, and the first woman and first American to ski from the summit of Mount Everest. She is only the third woman to climb and ski Grand Teton in Wyoming.

In May 2004, DesLauriers became the first American woman to climb and ski from the summit of the highest peak in America -- Denali, in Alaska. This was followed in 2005 with a trek to Mount Elbrus in Russia, Europe's highest peak, a descent from Mount Kosciuszko, the highest mountain in Australia, Vinson Massif, the highest peak on Antarctica, and Aconcagua, the highest peak in South America. In spring 2006 she climbed Mount Kilimanjaro, Africa's highest mountain.

On October 18, 2006, DesLauriers skied Mount Everest and became the first person to ski from the summit of the Seven Summits - the highest mountains on all seven continents.

== Personal life ==
DesLauriers and her husband, Rob DesLauriers, met in 1999 while on a mountaineering trip to Mount Belukha in Siberia. The couple live in Teton Village, Wyoming, where she is a stonemason and runs landscape design company Rockit Corporation. DesLauriers also coaches other women in skiing, and runs the "Turn It Up Women's Ski Camps." She also is a road and mountain bicycle competitor.

She is a certified Wilderness Emergency Medical Technician, a Telluride Professional Ski Patroller, a Rescue 3 International low to high angle rope rescue instructor, a Helicopter Rescue Technician, and volunteers with Search and Rescue.

== Film ==
- Like a Wolf

== Sources ==
- USA Today 2005 Article
