= Tomas Olsson =

Swedish ski mountaineer

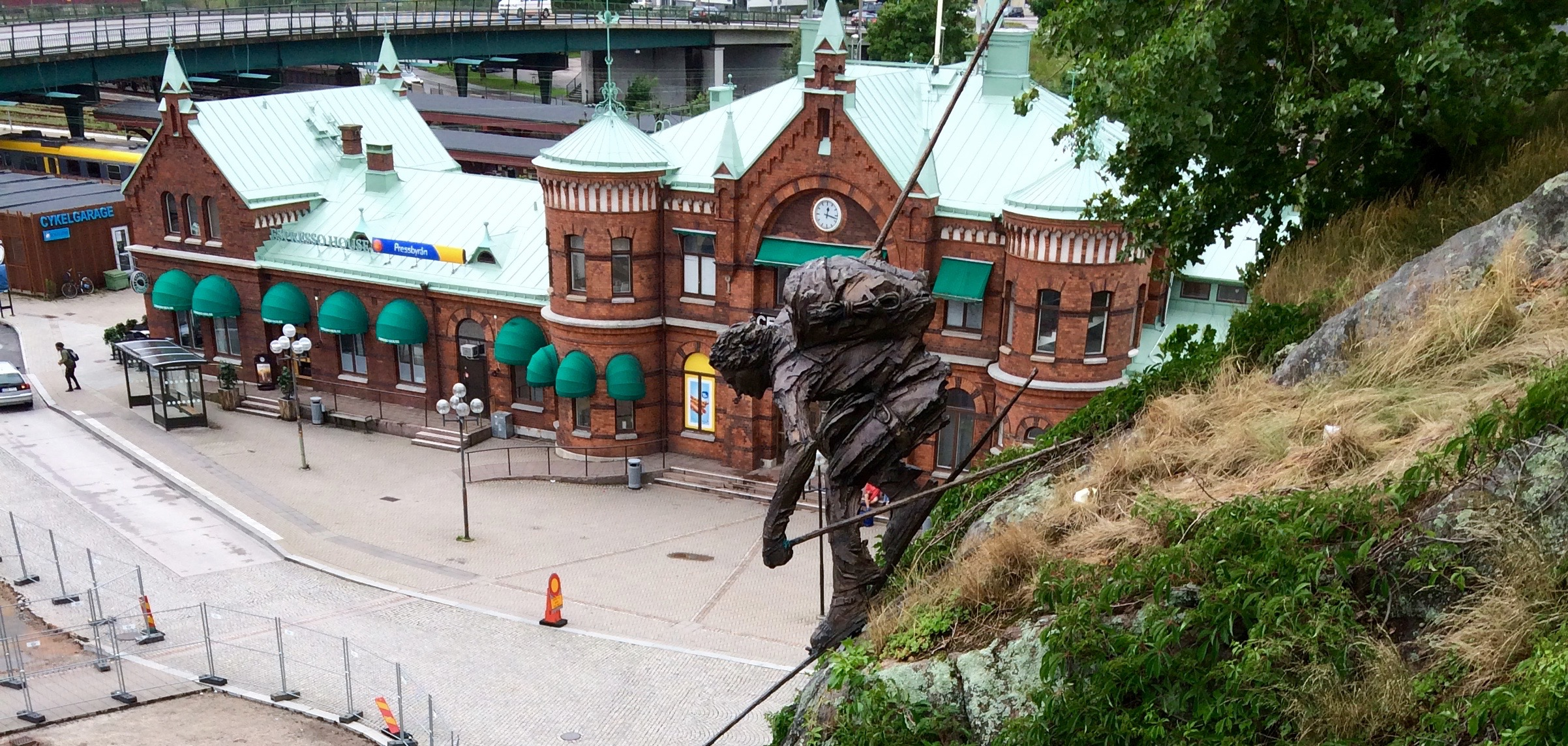
- Memorial to Tomas Olsson, a bronze sculpture by Richard Brixel inaugurated 16 May 2016 on a steep hill in central Borås.
- Born: 18 March 1976; Kristinehamn, Sweden
- Died: 16 May 2006 (aged 30); Mount Everest, Nepal
- Occupation: Ski mountaineer

Tomas Kenneth Olsson (18 March 1976 – 16 May 2006) was a Swedish adventurer and ski mountaineer. He was born in Kristinehamn but grew up in Borås. He took an engineering degree at Linköping University in 2001, after which he moved to Chamonix in France to focus on skiing. He specialized in skiing down some of the world's highest and steepest mountains. He had gone from the top of Aconcagua in Argentina (6960 m), Lenin Peak in Kyrgyzstan (7134 m), Muztagh Ata (7546 m) and Kuksay Peak (7134 m) in China and Cho Oyu in Tibet (8201 m).

In May 2006, Olsson was found dead after attempting a first descent of the North Face of Mount Everest.

== Biography ==
Tomas Olsson lived in Chamonix in France, where he worked as a professional extreme skier.

=== Birth and early life ===
He was born in Kristinehamn and raised in Borås. In high school, he became aware of action sports. By the time of his MSc studies in Linköping, he was devoted to skiing and climbing. After graduating in 2001, he moved to Chamonix to pursue skiing.

=== Life in Chamonix ===
Based at Chamonix in the French Alps, Olsson dedicated himself to skiing and climbing. Multiple times a year, he would go to exotic locations to explore new environments and to test his own limits. Tomas skied from the summit of Aconcagua (6960m) in Argentina, Peak Lenin (7134m) in Kyrgyzstan, Muztagh Ata (7546m) and Kuksay Peak (7134m) in China, Cho Oyu (8201m) in Tibet, and a volcano in Kamchatka in Siberia. Besides skiing, he had held lectures and worked in product development and promotions with Bergans of Norway and Silva Sweden.

=== Desire to ski down Everest ===
Olsson's ultimate goal, which was scheduled for spring 2006, was to once again stand on the summit of Everest. There, he planned that he and Norwegian Tormod Granheim would become the first skiers in the world to ski down Everest's steep north side. At the end of March 2006, he set off to go to Everest.

As training for the Everest expedition in June 2005, he cycled alone from Stockholm to Chamonix, climbed Mont Blanc (4810m), and then rode back to Sweden.

Olsson, Granheim and photographer Fredrik Schenholm approached Everest from the Tibetan side in Spring 2006. Olsson climbed the mountain from Advanced Base Camp, 6400 meters above sea level, to the summit (8848 m) in a 2 days effort. The route he followed, known as the Mallory route, normally takes climbers five days to complete.

Olsson and Graneheim reached Everest's peak on 16 May 2006. The pair then skied into the North Face by the Norton Couloir, a 55 degree steep and nearly 3000 meter high mountain face. The North Col (North Face) Route is one of the most difficult of all the difficult routes to the top of the mountain. On May 16, 2006, after a full day of climbing, the two met up on the mountain and reached the summit. Exhausted, they wondered if they had the strength to ski down. Undeterred by their fatigue, they set off on skis down the North Face via the Norton Couloir at angles as steep as 60 degrees and a sheer 3,000 meter drop. Unfortunately, just as they set off, and after only skiing down the North Face approximately 1,500 feet (460 meters), one of Olsson's skis broke, adding extra tension to the already complex task. They tried to repair the ski with tape. A cliff intersecting the couloir forced the two to make an abseil. A snow anchor failed and Olsson fell an estimated 2500 meters to his death. Granheim skied alone to the North Col.

Tomas Olsson was not the only one to attempt skiing down Mount Everest this year he was part of "The Vikings are back: Climb + Sky-ski Everest expedition 2006" with the ambition to ski down the North Col route of Mount Everest. As part of an ongoing project to ski the Seven summits, the Swedish expedition were involved in a project of climbing and sky-skiing down the Seven Summits. The expedition consisted of Tomas Olsson, Tormod Granheim from Norway and Fredrik Schenholm. The guys successfully skied down Cho Oyu in fall, 2004. However, logistical problems prevented the pair from attempting a similar feat on Shisha Pangma. Olsson and Granheim had been training hard all winter in Chamonix, French Alps, for the upcoming Everest challenge. Fredrik Schenholm would join the expedition as a photographer.

Another expedition, Swedish Everest Ski expedition (Martin Letzter and Olof Sundstrom), also skied down Everest the same day as Tomas Olsson using an easier route.

They had already skied Elbrus, Denali, Aconcagua, Kosciuszko, and Kilimanjaro during the last three years. To reach Mount Everest the team reached Tibet after driving 12,000 kilometers from Stockholm to Kathmandu, through such countries as Russia, Poland, Romania, Turkey, Iran, Pakistan and India, in a 13-year-old Land Rover Defender.

The team would have skied the Antarctica the coming winter if they would have been successful in completing their series by skiing Mount Vinson during the Antarctic summer 2006/2007.

== Mountain skiing ==
- 2002 – Aconcagua – 6962 m
- 2002 – Pik Lenin – 7134 m
- 2003 – Kuksay Peak – 7186 m
- 2003 – Muztagh Ata – 7546 m
- 2004 – Cho Oyu – 8201 m
- 2006 – Mount Everest – 8848 m

== See also ==
- List of people who died climbing Mount Everest
- Tormod Granheim
- David Sharp, who died the day before Olsson.
