= National Register of Historic Places listings in Blaine County, Idaho =

Location of Blaine County in Idaho

This is a list of the National Register of Historic Places listings in Blaine County, Idaho.

This is intended to be a complete list of the properties and districts on the National Register of Historic Places in Blaine County, Idaho, United States. Latitude and longitude coordinates are provided for many National Register properties and districts; these locations may be seen together in a map.

There are 23 properties and districts listed on the National Register in the county. More may be added; properties and districts nationwide are added to the Register weekly.

This National Park Service list is complete through NPS recent listings posted May 1, 2026.

== Current listings ==
	Name on the Register	Image	Date listed	Location	City or town	Description
1	Bald Mountain Hot Springs		November 17, 1982 (#82000320)	Main and 1st St. 43°40′44″N 114°21′42″W	Ketchum	
2	Bellevue Historic District	Bellevue Historic District	June 16, 1982 (#82002506)	Roughly bounded by U.S. Route 93, Cedar, 4th, and Oak Sts. 43°27′51″N 114°15′29″W	Bellevue	
3	Blaine County Courthouse	Blaine County Courthouse	February 17, 1978 (#78001050)	1st and Croy Sts. 43°31′08″N 114°18′42″W	Hailey	
4	Eben S. and Elizabeth S. Chase House	Eben S. and Elizabeth S. Chase House	May 5, 2009 (#09000292)	203 E. Bullion St. 43°31′14″N 114°18′47″W	Hailey	
5	Cold Springs Pegram Truss Railroad Bridge	Cold Springs Pegram Truss Railroad Bridge	July 25, 1997 (#97000762)	Over the Big Wood River 0.5 miles south of the junction of U.S. Route 93 and State Highway 367; 43°39′15″N 114°20′55″W	Ketchum	
6	Emmanuel Episcopal Church	Emmanuel Episcopal Church	October 5, 1977 (#77000457)	101 2nd Ave., S. 43°31′13″N 114°18′44″W	Hailey	
7	Fish Creek Dam		December 29, 1978 (#78003437)	Northeast of Carey; 43°25′23″N 113°49′54″W	Carey	
8	J. C. Fox Building	J. C. Fox Building	March 31, 1983 (#83000279)	S. Main St. 43°31′08″N 114°18′51″W	Hailey	
9	Fox–Worswick House	Fox–Worswick House	August 31, 2011 (#11000613)	119 E. Bullion St. 43°31′15″N 114°18′48″W	Hailey	
10	Gimlet Pegram Truss Railroad Bridge	Gimlet Pegram Truss Railroad Bridge	July 25, 1997 (#97000757)	Over the Big Wood River 0.5 miles south of the junction of U.S. Route 93 and East Fork Wood River Rd. 43°35′53″N 114°20′43″W	Ketchum	
11	Greenhow and Rumsey Store Building	Greenhow and Rumsey Store Building	August 18, 1983 (#83000280)	180 N. Main St. 43°40′48″N 114°21′47″W	Ketchum	
12	Hailey Masonic Lodge	Hailey Masonic Lodge	September 12, 2008 (#08000869)	100 S. 2nd Ave. 43°31′14″N 114°18′47″W	Hailey	
13	Hailey Methodist Episcopal Church	Hailey Methodist Episcopal Church	January 24, 2017 (#100000560)	200 2nd Ave., S. 43°31′11″N 114°18′43″W	Hailey	
14	Ernest and Mary Hemingway House		March 13, 2015 (#13001073)	Address restricted	Ketchum	
15	Ketchum Ranger District Administrative Site	Ketchum Ranger District Administrative Site	February 9, 2007 (#07000005)	131/171 River St. 43°40′42″N 114°21′45″W	Ketchum	
16	Henry Miller House		May 30, 1975 (#75000624)	South of Bellevue off U.S. Route 93; 43°26′47″N 114°15′16″W	Bellevue	
17	Homer Pound House	Homer Pound House	December 28, 1978 (#78001051)	314 2nd Ave., S. 43°31′05″N 114°18′35″W	Hailey	
18	Proctor Mountain Ski Lift	Proctor Mountain Ski Lift	January 20, 1980 (#80001294)	Trail Creek; 43°42′23″N 114°20′06″W	Sun Valley	
19	The Rialto Hotel	The Rialto Hotel	December 30, 2009 (#09001162)	201 S. Main St. 43°31′14″N 114°18′58″W	Hailey	
20	St. Charles of the Valley Catholic Church and Rectory	St. Charles of the Valley Catholic Church and Rectory	November 17, 1982 (#82000321)	Pine and S. 1st Sts. 43°31′02″N 114°18′42″W	Hailey	
21	Sawtooth City		April 4, 1975 (#75000625)	Southeast of Alturas Lake; 43°53′48″N 114°50′25″W	Sun Valley	
22	W. H. Watt Building	W. H. Watt Building	March 31, 1983 (#83000281)	120 N. Main St. 43°31′14″N 114°18′53″W	Hailey	
23	Werthheimer Building	Werthheimer Building	September 12, 1985 (#85002160)	101 S. Main St. 43°31′10″N 114°18′53″W	Hailey	

== Former listings ==
	Name on the Register	Image	Date listed	Date removed	Location	City or town	Description
1	Hiawatha Hotel		July 15, 1974 (#74000733)	January 31, 1986	First Ave. and Croy St.	Hailey	Burned down in January 1979.

== See also ==
- List of National Historic Landmarks in Idaho
- National Register of Historic Places listings in Idaho
