= Wood River Jewish Community =

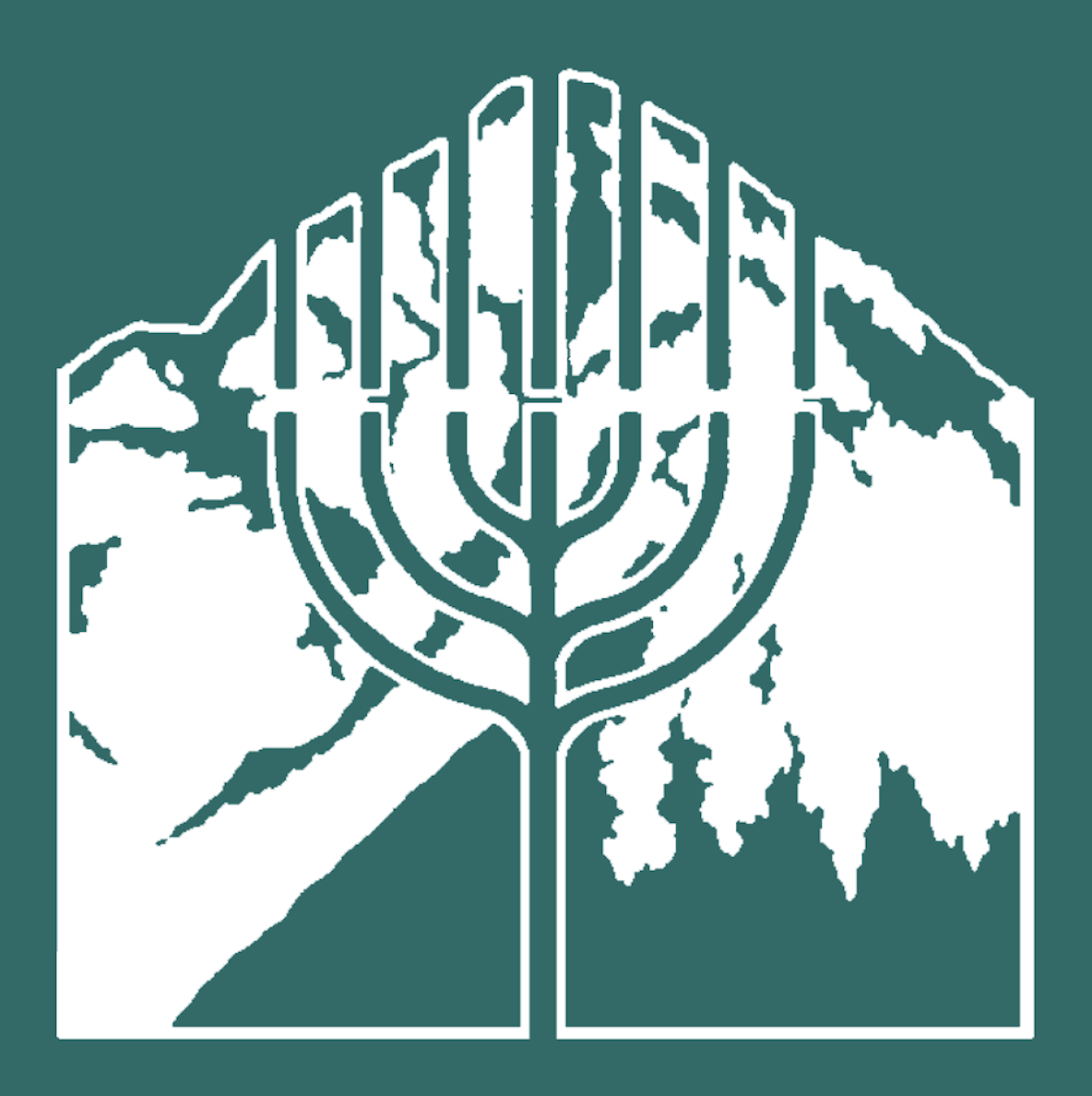
- Formation: 1983
- Type: Reform Judaism
- Location: Ketchum, Idaho
- Members: 200 families
- Website: wrjc.org

The Wood River Jewish Community, also known as the WRJC, is a Jewish congregation serving Ketchum, Hailey, Sun Valley, and Bellevue in the Wood River Valley in central Idaho. The congregation is affiliated with the Union for Reform Judaism.

== History ==
The first Jewish residents of the Wood River Valley included Simon J. Friedman, Simon M. Friedman, Leopold Werthheimer, and other German immigrants following a mining boom in the 1880s. After a mining bust in the 1890s, most Jewish residents left the valley until the 1950s and 60s, when the success of the Sun Valley Resort attracted Jews once again to settle in the region.

A growing Jewish community, alternatively named the WRJC and “Temple Beth Baldy” after Bald Mountain, celebrated Shabbat and holidays in living rooms and local restaurants including the Sun Valley Lodge. A congregation was formally established in 1983 by Helen and Ben Goldberg, Carlyn Ring, Naomi Fine, and Steven Luber in the Goldberg home.

In 1989, the WRJC received a 150-year-old Torah scroll that had survived the Holocaust in Czechoslovakia. An ark designed by Ketchum-based artist David Hurd was dedicated in 1998 and the Torah scroll was restored in 2003.

== Clergy ==
Wood River Jewish Community Spiritual Leaders
Tenure	Clergy	Status
1995 to 2000	Rabbi Laura Rappaport	part-time
2002 to 2006	Rabbi Martin Levy	full-time
2006 to 2007	Rabbi Sheila Goloboy	part-time
2007 to 2008	Rabbi Barnett Brickner	part-time
2014 to 2017	Rabbi James Mirel	part-time
2018 to 2023	Rabbi Cantor Robbi Sherwin	part-time
2024 to present	Rabbi Sam Klein	full-time

== Building ==
In the 1990s, the WRJC held Jewish religious services in Ketchum’s Presbyterian Church of the Bigwood. In the early 2000s, the congregation began holding services at the St. Thomas Episcopal Church.

In 2023, the WRJC opened a permanent synagogue in Sun Valley’s Elkhorn neighborhood, which is the third synagogue building in Idaho after Congregation Ahavath Beth Israel in Boise and Temple Emanuel in Pocatello.
