= Fox House =

Fox House, Fox Hall, Fox Building, Fox Farm, or Fox Farm site may refer to:

== Entertainment ==
- Fox Farm (novel), a 1911 novel by the British writer Warwick Deeping
- Fox Farm (film), a 1922 silent film directed by Guy Newall based on novel

== Places ==
(sorted by state, then city/town)

- Fox Motel House, listed on the National Register of Historic Places (NRHP) in White County, Arkansas
- Fox House (Pine Bluff, Arkansas), listed on the NRHP in Jefferson County, Arkansas
- Fox Stone Barn, Boulder, Colorado, listed on the NRHP in Boulder County, Colorado
- White–Fox House Archeological Site, New Smyrna Beach, Florida, listed on the NRHP in Volusia County, Florida
- J. C. Fox Building, Hailey, Idaho, listed on the NRHP in Blaine County, Idaho
- Fox–Worswick House, Hailey, Idaho, listed on the NRHP in Blaine County, Idaho
- Fox River House, Aurora, Illinois, listed on the NRHP in Kane County, Illinois
- William Fox House, listed on the NRHP in Pulaski County, Kentucky
- Fox Farm site (Mays Lick, Kentucky) near Mays Lick, Kentucky, NRHP-listed
- Weaver–Fox House, Uniontown, Maryland, NRHP-listed
- Warren Fox Building, Lowell, Massachusetts, NRHP-listed
- Herbert M. Fox House, Becker, Minnesota, NRHP-listed
- Foxx–Cox House, listed on the NRHP in Lincoln County, Mississippi
- Fox House (Wanilla, Mississippi), listed on the NRHP in Lawrence County, Mississippi
- Van Winkle–Fox House, listed on the NRHP in Bergen County, New Jersey
- James Fox House, listed on the NRHP in Yates County, New York
- Albert R. Fox House, listed on the NRHP in Rensselaer County, New York
- Fox Haven Plantation, listed on the NRHP in Rutherford County, North Carolina
- Snipes–Fox House, listed on the NRHP in Chatham County, North Carolina
- Fox–Pope Farm, listed on the NRHP in Geauga County, Ohio
- Fox House (Lexington, South Carolina), listed on the NRHP in Lexington County, South Carolina
- S. H. Fox House, listed on the NRHP in Collin County, Texas
- Jacob Fox House, listed on the NRHP in Victoria County, Texas
- Fox–Cook Farm, listed on the NRHP in Rutland County, Vermont
- Fox Hall (Westmore, Vermont), listed on the NRHP in Orleans County, Vermont
- John Fox Jr. House, listed on the NRHP in Wise County, Virginia
- Fox Farm site (McMullin, Virginia), listed on the NRHP in Smyth County, Virginia
- Red Fox Farm, listed on the NRHP in Mecklenburg County, Virginia
- Fox House, South Yorkshire
- Fox Hall, West Virginia
- Fox Hall (Fitchburg, Wisconsin), listed on the NRHP in Dane County, Wisconsin
