= Sun Valley =

Sun Valley may refer to:

== Places ==
=== Australia ===
- Sun Valley, New South Wales
- Sun Valley, Queensland, a suburb of Gladstone

=== United States ===
- Valley of the Sun, a region that covers the Phoenix metropolitan area
- Sun Valley, Arizona
- Sun Valley, Los Angeles, California
- Sun Valley, Denver, Colorado
- Sun Valley, Idaho
- Sun Valley, Nevada
- Sun Valley, Pennsylvania
- Sun Valley, Texas
- Sun Valley, West Virginia

=== Elsewhere ===
- Sun Valley, Saskatchewan, Canada
- Sun Valley, Cape Town, South Africa
- Sun Valley, Parañaque, Metro Manila, Philippines
- Sun Valley, Honiara, Solomon Islands
- Sun Valley (Taiwan), a tourist attraction in Yanchao District, Kaohsiung

== Other uses ==
- The Sun Valley, a version of the Mercury Montclair automobile made in 1954 and 1955
- "Sun Valley", a United States Air Force codename for C-130A-II Sigint missions to monitor Soviet transmissions in the late 1950s
- Sun Valley (film), a Chinese film
- Sun Valley Serenade, a 1941 musical film
- Sun Valley Magazine, an American magazine published in Idaho
- Sunvalley Shopping Center, a mall in Concord, California
- SunValley Speedway (renamed Motoplex Speedway), an auto racing facility in British Columbia
- "Sun Valley", the codename for the Windows 11 operating system
- Allen & Company Sun Valley Conference in Idaho

== See also ==
- Sunny Valley, Oregon
- Valley of the Sun, Phoenix, Arizona
- Valley of the Sun (film), a 1942 Western film
- Sun Valley Airport (disambiguation)
- Sun Valley High School (disambiguation)
