= Leopold Werthheimer =

Merchant and philanthropist in Hailey, Idaho

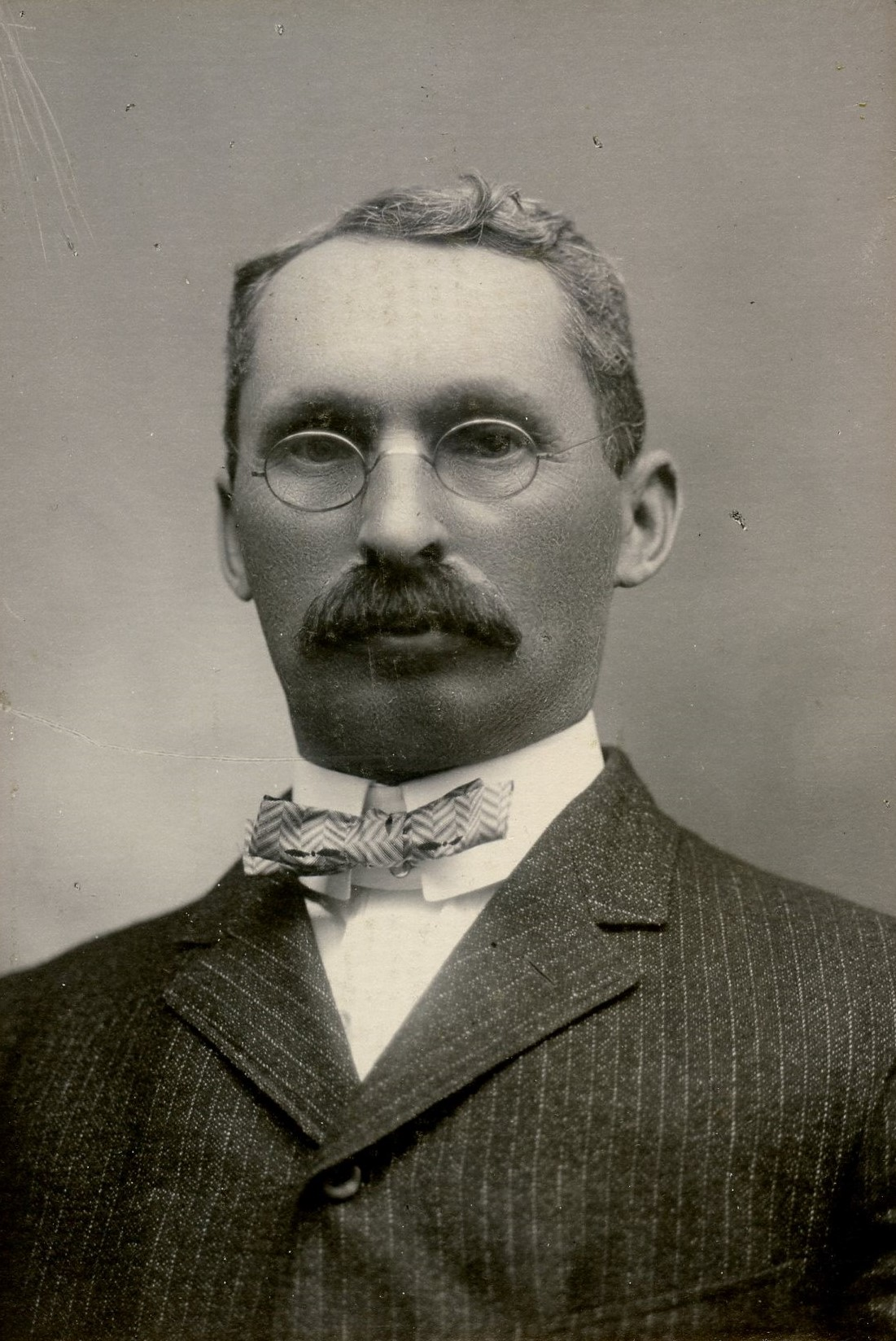

Personal details
- Born: c. 1854 Germany
- Died: 1913 (aged 58–59) Hailey, Idaho

Leopold Werthheimer (c. 1854-1913) was a leading merchant and philanthropist in Hailey, Idaho.

== Early life ==
Werthheimer was born to a Jewish family in Germany and immigrated to the United States in 1872. After spending two years in New York, he moved to Cheyenne, Wyoming, and entered the clothing trade with his uncle.

In 1884, at the age of thirty, he moved to Hailey, which was then a booming mining town in the recently established Idaho Territory.

== Career ==
When Werthheimer settled in Hailey, he opened a men’s clothing and furnishing store at the corner of the city’s Main and Bullion Streets. Like many other local Jewish immigrants, including Simon M. Friedman and Simon J. Friedman, Werthheimer was an active member of the Hailey Lodge of the Independent Order of Odd Fellows, a fraternal service organization. He found commercial success and, in 1887, was able to purchase the building that housed his store.

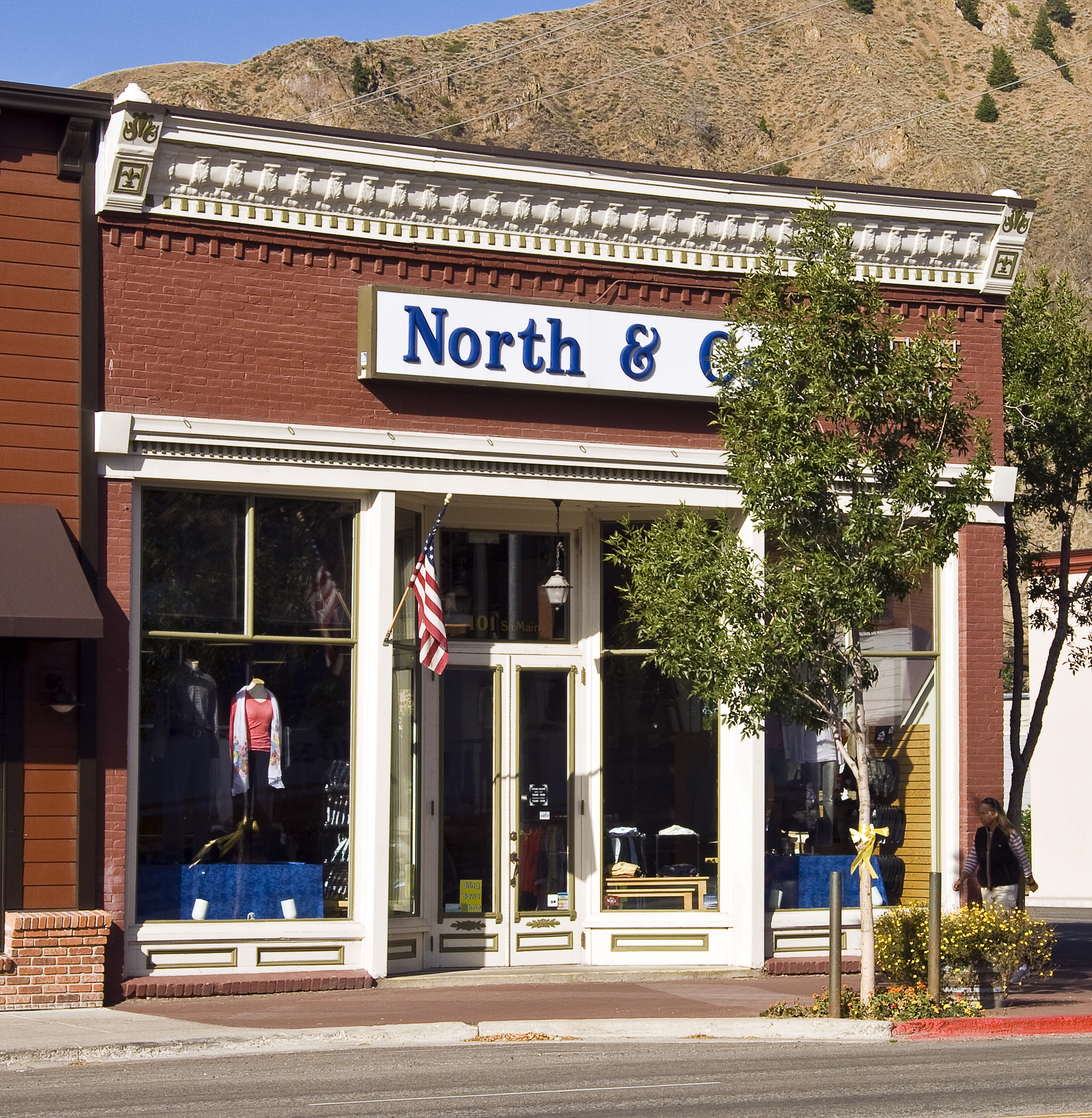
The Werthheimer Building in Hailey, ID is a protected landmark due to its historical significance.

On July 2, 1889, a large fire destroyed almost all of Hailey’s business district, including Werthheimer’s Bullion Block.

While many merchants left the Wood River Valley after the fire, Werthheimer chose to stay, quickly rebuilding his store and the other buildings on the Bullion Block in partnership with local merchant J.C. Fox. He continued to achieve commercial success and soon expanded his business activities to become a rancher, money lender, and director of the Hailey National Bank.

== Legacy ==
When Werthheimer died on December 29, 1913, the Wood River Times reported that 25 sleighs carrying four to ten mourners each accompanied his body to the local cemetery. “But for the snow storm which lasted all day,” the Times clarified, “the attendance would have been the largest at any funeral seen on Wood River. As a mark of respect the bank, public offices and a majority of public businesses were closed from noon until after the funeral.”

Upon his death, he left an estate of considerably more than $100,000 (worth $2,750,000 in 2021 dollars) to local charitable endeavors, including a $1,000 donation to the City of Hailey to refurbish an area that was being used as a horse-racing track. Out of gratitude for his generosity, the city renamed the area Werthheimer Park.

In 1985, Werthheimer’s former store at 101 S Main Street in Hailey was added to the National Register of Historic Places. It is formally named the Werthheimer Building in recognition of its architectural significance and his decision to rebuild it after the fire of 1889.
