= Rotarun Ski Area =

Ski area in Idaho, United States

- Location in Idaho Location in the United States
- Location: 25 Rodeo Drive; Blaine County, Idaho, U.S.
- Nearest city: Hailey
- Coordinates: 43°29′51.0″N 114°21′57.6″W
- Vertical: 475 feet (145 m)
- Top elevation: 5,895 feet (1,797 m)
- Base elevation: 5,420 feet (1,652 m)
- Lift system: 1 Poma lift
- Night skiing: Wednesdays and Fridays (6–9 p.m.)
- Website: rotarun.org

Rotarun Ski Area is a modest ski area in central Idaho, less than three miles (5 km) west of Hailey in Blaine County. The elevation of its summit is 5,895 feet (1,797 m) above sea level, with a vertical drop of 475 feet (145 m) on its treeless north-facing slopes of Art Richards Mountain. A Poma lift was installed in 1998; it replaced a J-bar lift that had served since 1964. The primary lift before the J-bar was a rope tow.

The facility has operated since the 1950s and offers an affordable alternative for alpine skiing for the Wood River Valley. (The world-famous Sun Valley resort is fifteen miles (25 km) north at Ketchum, with significantly higher prices.)

Supported by community volunteers and donations, Rotarun operates on Wednesday and Friday nights and weekend days; it is the only ski area for night skiing within a three hours' drive (Bogus Basin, northeast of Boise).

== See also ==
- List of ski areas and resorts in the United States#Idaho
- Comparison of North American ski resorts
