= Herbert Allen III =

American businessman

- Born: 1966 or 1967 (age 59–60)
- Known for: President of Allen & Company
- Spouse: Monica de la Torre
- Parents: Herbert Allen Jr. (father); Laura Parrish Allen (mother)
- Relatives: Herbert A. Allen Sr. (grandfather)

Herbert A. Allen III is an American businessman.

== Biography ==
Allen is the son of Laura (née Parrish) and Herbert Allen Jr., former president of Allen & Company, and grandson of Herbert A. Allen, Sr. who co-founded Allen & Company with his older brother, Charles Robert Allen, Jr. Allen & Company was one of the first in the industry to specialize in corporate takeovers. He has three siblings: Charles, Leslie, and Christie. His parents later divorced and his father remarried Broadway dancer Ann Reinking. Allen graduated from Yale University with a BA in history. He took over Allen & Company in 2002 and is president and Chief Executive Officer of Allen & Company.

In October 2012, Vanity Fair ranked him number 18 in their list of The New Establishment. Herbert Allen III, also known as Herb Allen, is a Wilson Center Expert. In 2021, Allen was elected as a director of the Coca-Cola Company.

== Personal life ==
Herbert Allen III is married to Monica de la Torre, a public-interest lawyer and native of Puerto Rico.

The couple are known for maintaining a low public profile, consistent with the family’s tradition of privacy surrounding Allen & Company. Unlike many Wall Street executives, Allen avoids publicity and rarely gives interviews, preferring to focus on the firm’s role as a behind-the-scenes adviser to major media and technology mergers.

Outside of his business activities, Allen is a frequent host and participant at the annual Sun Valley Conference, where global media, technology, and political leaders gather for private discussions and dealmaking.
