= KPTO =

KPTO may refer to:

- KPTO-LD, a low-power television station (channel 32, virtual 41) licensed to serve Pocatello, Idaho, United States
- KHLY, a radio station (1440 AM) licensed to serve Hailey, Idaho, which held the call sign KPTO from 2003 to 2005 and from 2005 to 2019
