= St. Charles of the Valley Catholic Church and Rectory =

Historic church in Idaho, United States

- U.S. National Register of Historic Places
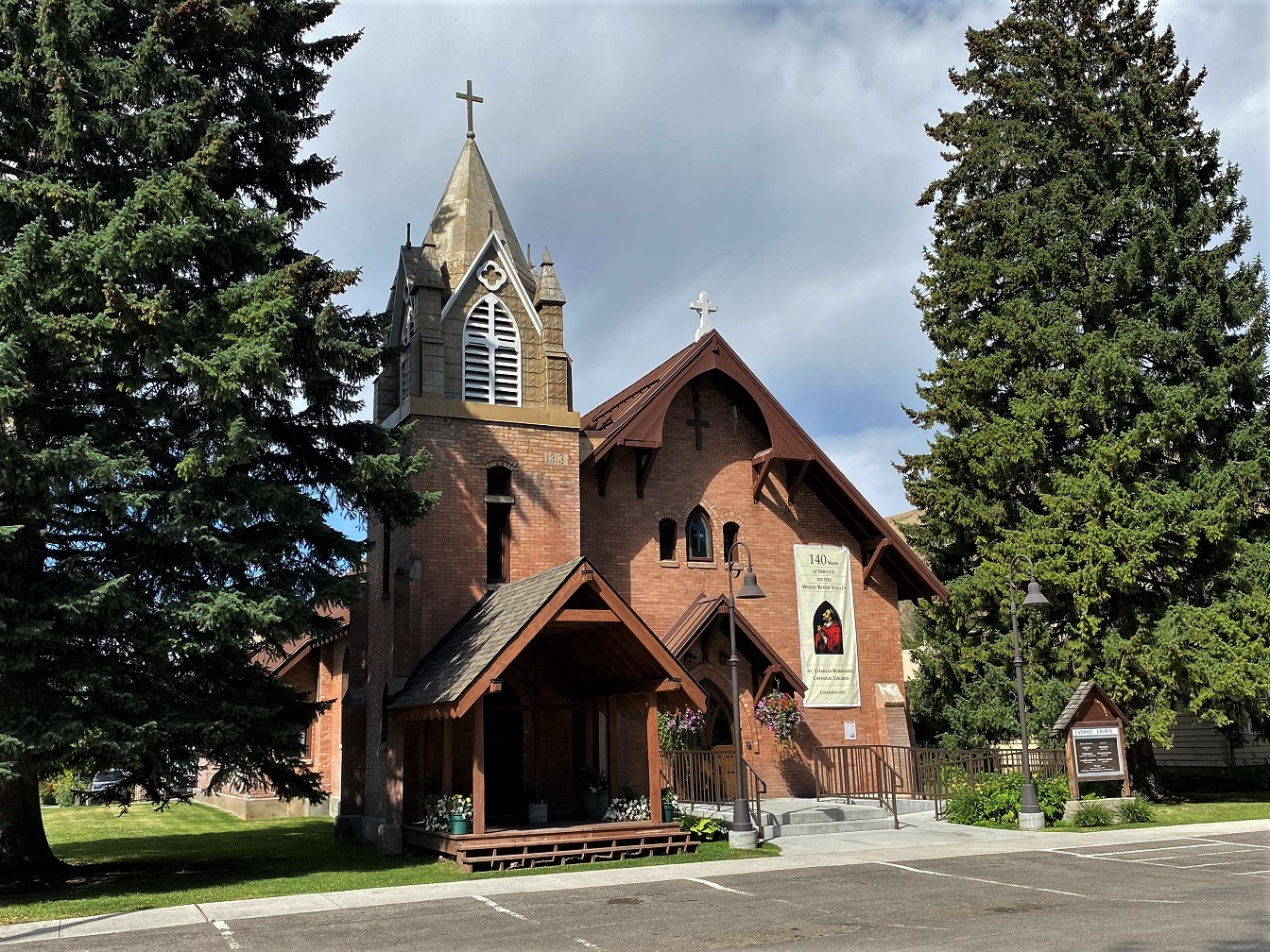
- Saint Charles Borromeo Church in 2023

- Location within Idaho Location within the United States
- Location: Pine and S. 1st Sts. Hailey, Idaho
- Coordinates: 43°31′2″N 114°18′42″W
- Area: less than one acre
- Built: 1914
- Architect: Tourtellotte & Hummel
- Architectural style: Gothic Revival
- MPS: Tourtellotte and Hummel Architecture TR
- NRHP reference No.: 82000321
- Added to NRHP: November 17, 1982

St. Charles Borromeo Church is a Catholic parish church in Hailey, Idaho, in the Diocese of Boise. Its historic parish church and rectory complex, located at Pine and S. 1st Streets, is listed on the National Register of Historic Places.

Fr. E.M. Nattini began ministering in the Wood River Valley in the 1880s. The population was growing rapidly, and he was soon able to raise funds for the construction of the first church of St. Charles, which began June 17, 1883. It was the first Catholic church east of Boise, and may be considered the mother church of southeastern Idaho.

== Architecture ==
The current church was designed by architects Tourtellotte & Hummel in the Gothic Revival style, and built by Nicholas F. Wirtzberger in 1913 at cost of $7,200. Among its distinctive elements is a stamped-metal belfry constructed in an ornate symmetrical plan. The complex also includes what has been known as Father Keys House.

A surviving window from the first church building can be viewed at the Reinheimer Barn on Highway 75 south of Ketchum. The complex was listed on the National Register in 1982. The listing included two contributing buildings.
