= Werthheimer Building =

- U.S. National Register of Historic Places
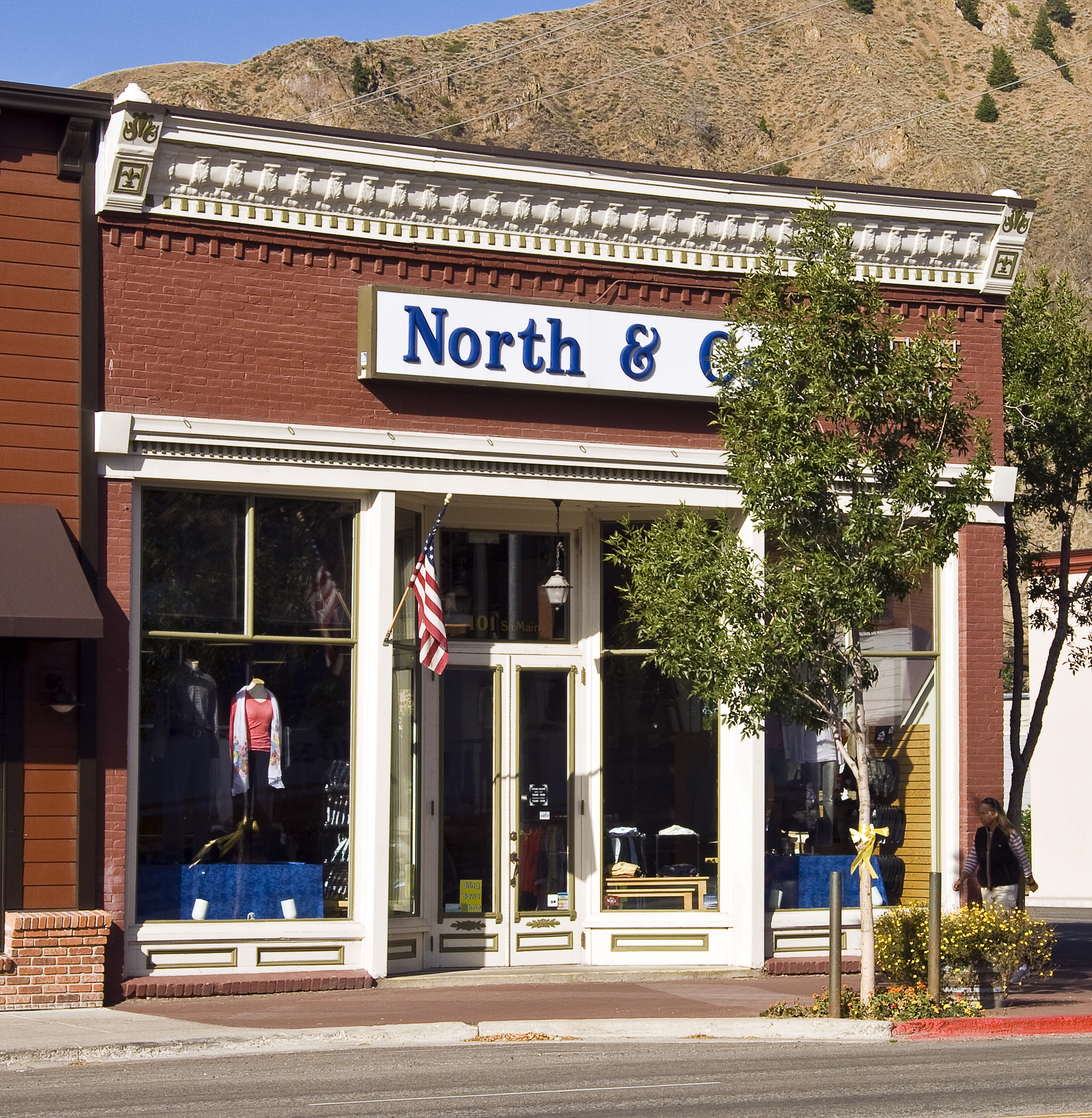

- Location within Idaho Location within the United States
- Location: 101 S. Main St., Hailey, Idaho
- Coordinates: 43°31′10″N 114°18′53″W
- Area: less than one acre
- Built: 1889
- NRHP reference No.: 85002160
- Added to NRHP: September 12, 1985

The Werthheimer Building is a one-story brick commercial building at 101 S. Main St. in Hailey, Idaho named for Leopold Werthheimer that was listed on the National Register of Historic Places in 1985. It was built in 1889 and served as the first courthouse in Hailey; a jail was in its basement level. A second floor existed but was destroyed by fire and was not replaced.

It is built of brick laid in common bond. It was renovated in 1981 using funding under the Economic Recovery Tax Act of 1981.
