= Rialto Hotel =

- The Rialto Hotel
- U.S. National Register of Historic Places
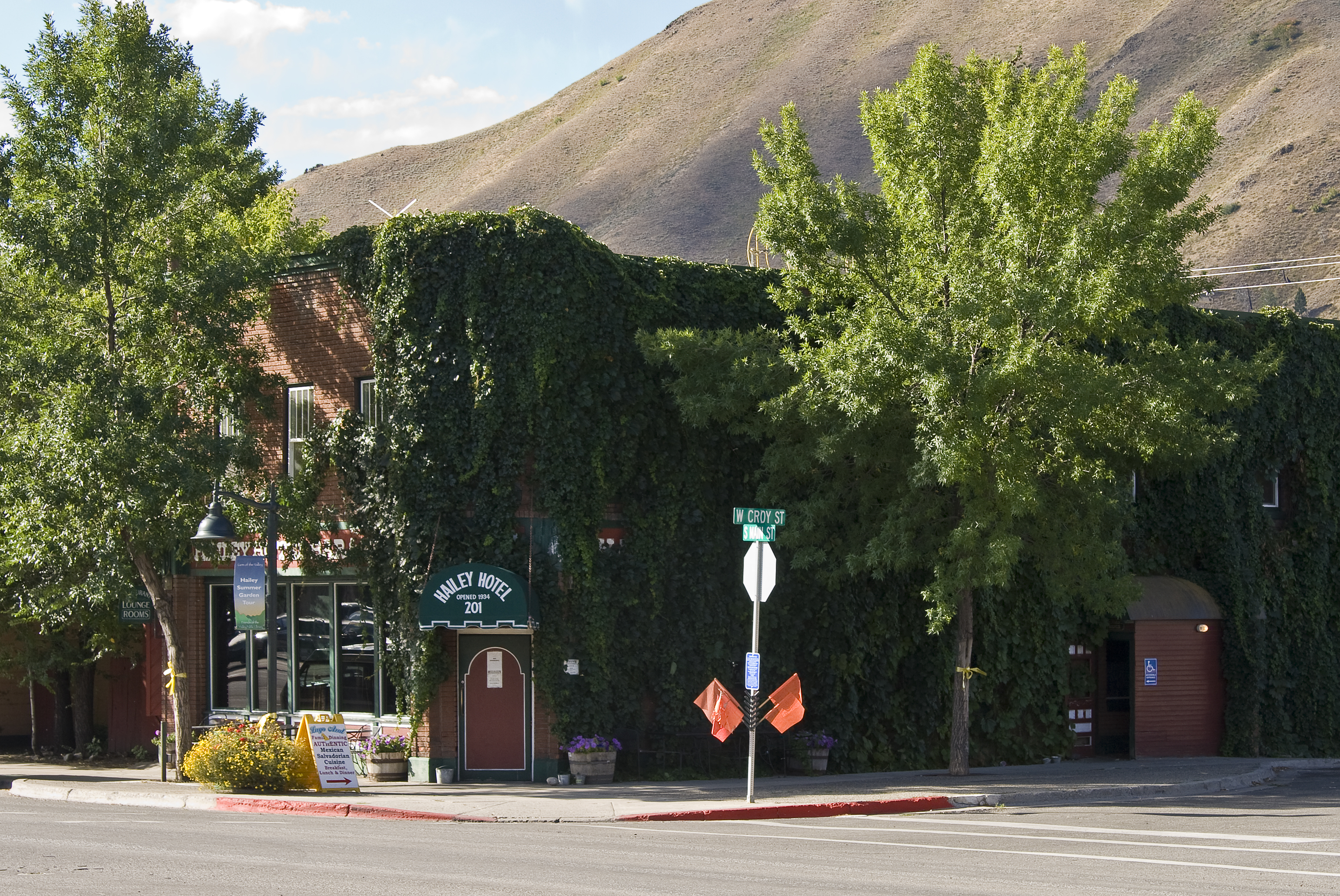

- Location within Idaho Location within the United States
- Location: 201 S. Main St., Hailey, Idaho
- Coordinates: 43°31′13″N 114°18′53″W
- Area: Less than one acre
- Built: 1934
- Built by: Rutter, John M. (Jack)
- NRHP reference No.: 09001162
- Added to NRHP: December 30, 2009

The Rialto Hotel, known since 1980 as the Hailey Hotel, is a historic hotel in Hailey, Idaho, United States. It was a boarding house and cafe built in 1934. It now hosts a bar and, on its upper floor, a radio station, KSKI-FM.

It was listed on the National Register of Historic Places in 2009.
