= Herbert A. Allen Sr. =

American stockbroker (1908–1997)

- Born: February 13, 1908
- Died: January 18, 1997 (aged 88); New York City, U.S.
- Education: High School dropout
- Occupations: Stockbroker, investor, racehorse owner
- Board member of: Allen & Company, Benguet Consolidated Mining Co., Ogden Corp., Irvine Company
- Spouse: Ethel Strong
- Children: 2, including Herbert Allen Jr.
- Relatives: Herbert Allen III (grandson)

Herbert A. Allen Sr. (February 13, 1908 – January 18, 1997) was an American stockbroker.

== Biography ==
A partner in Allen & Company with his older brother, Charles Robert Allen Jr., for more than fifty-five years. They were one of the first in the industry to specialize in corporate takeovers. One of the wealthiest figures on Wall Street, in 1956 he was appointed chairman of Benguet Consolidated Mining Co. which had chrome and gold mining operations in the Philippines. Among his other investments, the Allen brothers' company held an eighty percent share position in Ogden Corporation as well as a substantial holding in pharmaceutical manufacturer, Syntex Corporation. He also controlled the Irvine Ranch in California, which was converted into a substantial real estate development company.

He was a major benefactor to Columbia-Presbyterian Medical Center, which named a community hospital in honor of the family. Herbert Allen became a major participant in Thoroughbred horse racing.

== Personal life ==
He was married to Ethel Strong, an Irish Catholic. Allen was a non-practicing Unitarian. They had two children, Herbert Allen Jr. and Susan Allen.
