= Eben S. and Elizabeth S. Chase House =

Historic house in Idaho, United States

- U.S. National Register of Historic Places
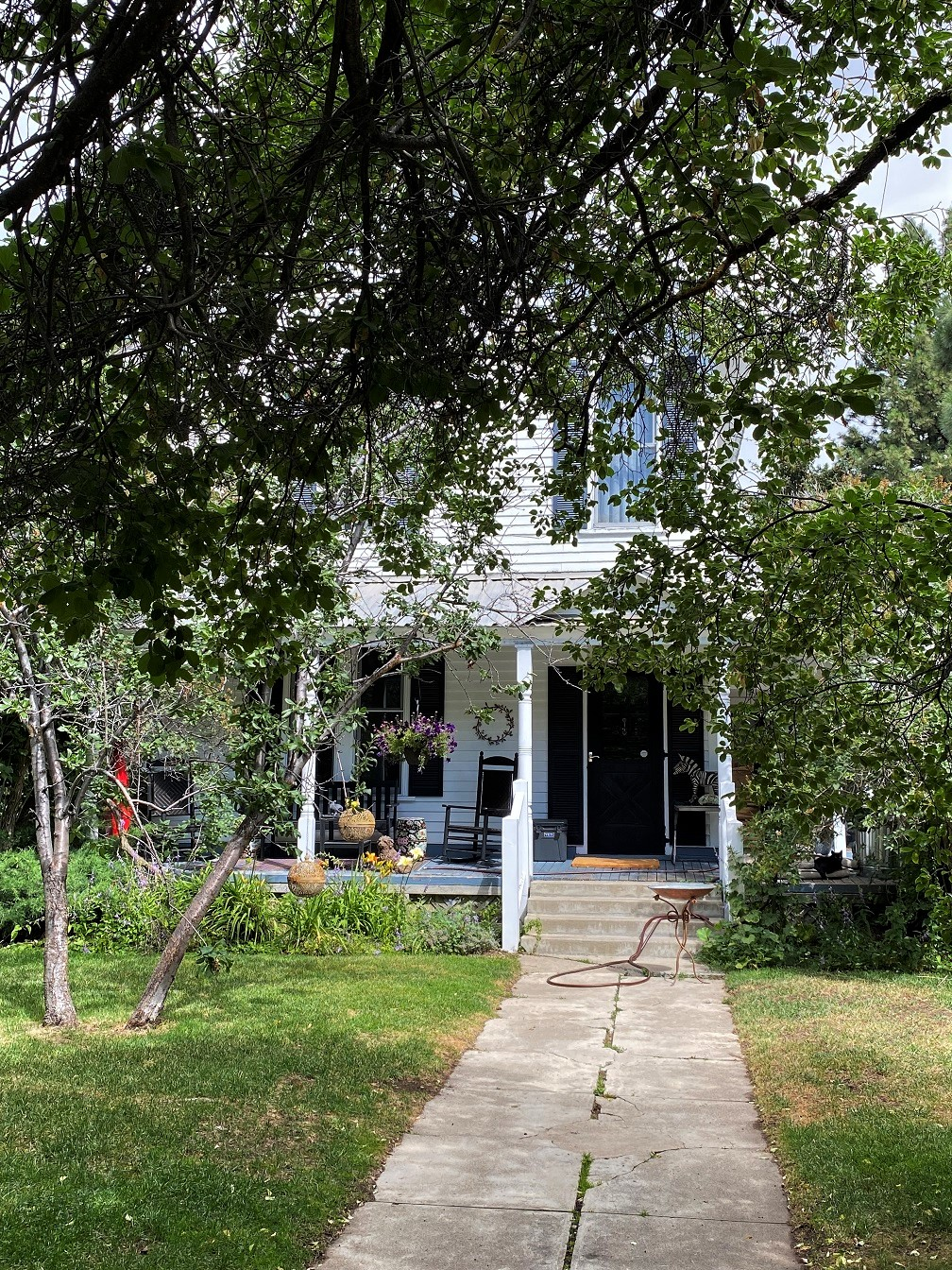
- Eben S. and Elizabeth S. Chase House in 2023

- Location within Idaho Location within the United States
- Location: 203 E. Bullion St. Hailey, Idaho
- Coordinates: 43°31′23″N 114°18′46″W
- Area: less than one acre
- Built: 1885
- Architectural style: Vernacular gable front
- NRHP reference No.: 09000292
- Added to NRHP: May 5, 2009

The Eben S. and Elizabeth S. Chase House, located at 203 E. Bullion St. in Hailey, Idaho, is a historic house that was built in 1885. It was first the home of Italian immigrant Peter Snider, who owned the Challenger Mine. It was also the home of U. S. Marshal E. S. Chase, who, with John Hailey, A. H. Boomer, and W.T. Riley, had the townsite of Hailey surveyed and platted in 1881. The house is listed on the National Register of Historic Places.

The owners of the house at time of NRHP listing had bought the home 40 years earlier with little idea of its history.

Also known as the Peter and Maria Snider House and as Temp. Site No. 30, it includes gable front vernacular architecture. The NRHP listing included two contributing buildings.
