= Allen & Company =

American investment bank

Allen & Company LLC

- Headquarters in Manhattan (2026)
- Type: Private
- Industry: Banking
- Founded: 1922; 104 years ago
- Founder: Charles Robert Allen, Jr.
- Headquarters: 711 Fifth Avenue; New York City
- Area served: United States
- Key people: Herbert Allen III
- Products: Investment banking
- Number of employees: 170 (2010)
- Website: none

Allen & Company LLC is an American privately held boutique investment bank based at 711 Fifth Avenue, New York. The firm specializes in real estate, technology, media and entertainment.

== History ==
Founded in 1922 by Charles Robert Allen, Jr., he was soon joined by his brothers, Herbert A. Allen, Sr. and Harold Allen. The firm is generally regarded as a boutique advisory firm with a specific specialization in real estate and the media and entertainment sectors.

Allen & Company, which since 2002 has been run by Herbert Allen III, grandnephew of the founder, generally shies away from publicity and does not maintain a website or issue press releases, with the exception of the extensive media procured for its annual conference evidenced by its allowance of access to the conference by financial media properties such as CNBC, The Wall Street Journal and others to cover its event.

In 1973, Allen & Company bought a stake in Columbia Pictures. When the business was sold in 1982 to Coca-Cola, it netted a significant profit. Since then, Herbert Allen, Jr. has had a place on Coca-Cola's board of directors.

Since its founding in 1982, the Allen & Company Sun Valley Conference has regularly drawn high-profile attendees such as Bill Gates, Warren Buffett, Rupert Murdoch, Barry Diller, Michael Eisner, Oprah Winfrey, Robert Johnson, Andy Grove, Richard Parsons, and Donald Keough.

Allen & Co. was one of ten underwriters for the Google initial public offering in 2004. In 2007, Allen was sole advisor to Activision in its $18 billion merger with Vivendi Games. In 2011, the New York Mets hired Allen & Co. to sell a minority stake of the team. That deal later fell apart. In November 2013, Allen & Co. was one of seven underwriters on the initial public offering of Twitter. Allen & Co. was the adviser of Facebook in its $19 billion acquisition of WhatsApp in February 2014.

In 2015, Allen & Co. was the advisor to Time Warner Cable in its $80 billion 2015 merger with Charter Communications, AOL in its acquisition by Verizon, Centene Corporation in its $6.8 billion acquisition of Health Net, and eBay in its separation from PayPal.

In 2016, Allen & Co was the lead advisor to Time Warner in its $108 billion acquisition by AT&T, LinkedIn for its merger talks with Microsoft, Walmart in its $3.3 billion purchase of Jet.com, and Verizon in its $4.8 billion acquisition of Yahoo!. In 2017, Allen & Co. was the advisor to Chewy.com in PetSmart's $3.35 billion purchase of the online retailer.

== Presidents/CEOs ==
- Charles R. Allen, Jr. (1922–1994)
- Herbert A. Allen, Jr. (1966–2002)
- Herbert A. Allen III (2002– )

== Notable former employees ==
- Bob Kerrey, former Senator and Governor of Nebraska
- George Tenet, former Director of the CIA
- Stephen Greenberg, son of baseball Hall of Fame Hank Greenberg
- Bill Bradley, former United States Senator and Basketball Hall of Fame
- Dara Khosrowshahi, CEO of Uber Technologies

== See also ==
- Herbert Allen, Jr.
- Herbert Allen III
- Allen & Company Sun Valley Conference
