= Sun Valley Airport =

Sun Valley Airport may refer to:

- Sun Valley Airport (Arizona) in Bullhead City, Arizona, United States (FAA: A20)
- Friedman Memorial Airport formerly Sun Valley Airport, in Hailey, Idaho, United States (FAA/IATA: SUN)
