= Friedman Memorial Airport =

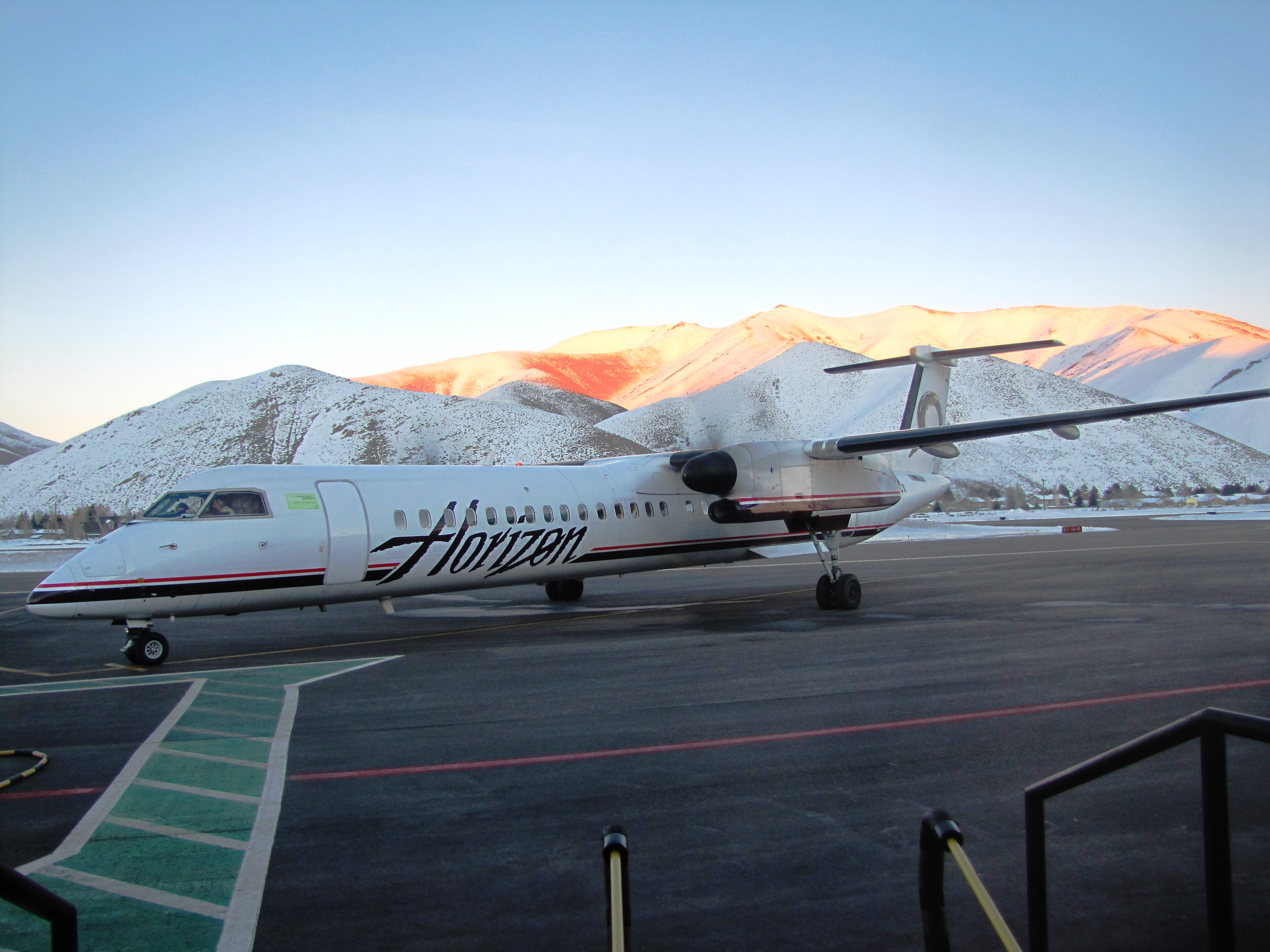
- Horizon Air DHC-8 at the passenger terminal (2012)
- IATA: SUN; ICAO: KSUN; FAA LID: SUN

Summary
- Airport type: Public
- Owner: City of Hailey
- Operator: Friedman Memorial; Airport Authority
- Serves: Hailey, Ketchum, Sun Valley
- Location: Hailey, Blaine County, Idaho, U.S.
- Opened: 1932, 1960 (scheduled service)
- Time zone: Mountain (UTC−7)
  - Summer (DST): (UTC−6)
- Elevation AMSL: 5,318 ft (1,621 m)
- Coordinates: 43°30′14″N 114°17′44″W
- Website: iflysun.com

Maps
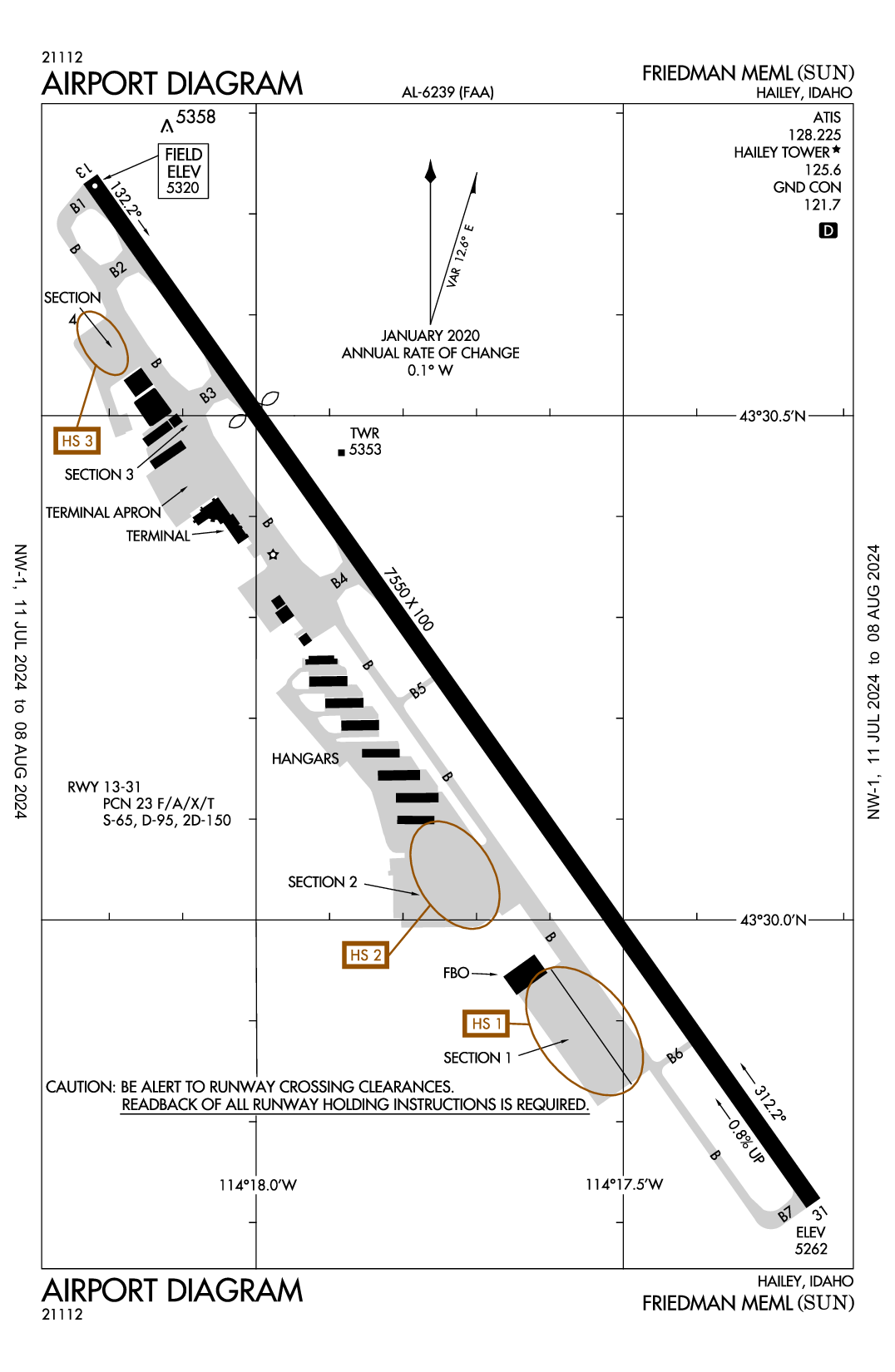
- FAA Airport Diagram as of July 2024
- Interactive map of Friedman Memorial Airport

Runways
| Direction | Length | | Surface |
| Direction | ft | m | Surface |
|---|---|---|---|
| 13/31 | 7,550 | 2,301 | Asphalt |

Statistics (2018)
- Aircraft operations: 26,571
- Based aircraft: 157
- Sources: airport website and FAA

Friedman Memorial Airport (IATA: SUN, ICAO: KSUN, FAA LID: SUN) is a city-owned public-use airport in the northwest United States, located one nautical mile (2 km) southeast of the central business district of Hailey, the county seat of Blaine County, Idaho. The airport is operated by the Friedman Memorial Airport Authority under a joint powers agreement between the city of Hailey and Blaine County. It serves the resort communities of Sun Valley and Ketchum, and the surrounding areas in the Wood River Valley.

Friedman Memorial Airport, the gateway to Sun Valley, is built on land donated to the city of Hailey by Leon and Lucile Friedman in 1931 and named in memory of their father, Simon M. Friedman. Simon was a local merchant and rancher who arrived in Hailey in the 1880s and served as mayor from 1909 to 1913.

== Facilities and aircraft ==
Friedman Memorial Airport covers an area of 211 acres (0.85 km^{2}) at an elevation of 5,318 feet (1,621 m) above sea level. It has one asphalt paved runway designated 13/31 which measures 7,550 by 100 feet (2,301 by 30 m).

For the 12-month period ending May 31, 2007, the airport had 68,540 aircraft operations, an average of 187 per day: 58% general aviation, 38% air taxi, 3% scheduled commercial and <1% military. At that time there were 150 aircraft based at this airport: 67% single-engine, 25% multi-engine, 5% jet, 1% helicopter and 1% ultralight.

== Early history ==
In 1931, the Friedman family donated a large part of land for the new airport, just before it was officially recognized in 1932. According to historic photographs, the site had been used for aviation as early as 1916. Scheduled commercial passenger service began at the airport in the late summer of 1960 with the arrival of West Coast Airlines, a forerunner of both Air West and Hughes Airwest. According to various West Coast Airlines system timetables during the 1960s, the airline was serving Sun Valley with Douglas DC-3 and Piper Navajo twin prop aircraft. West Coast successor Air West briefly served Friedman with Piper Navajo twin prop commuter aircraft, which served nonstop flights to Boise, Salt Lake City, and Portland, Oregon, following West Coast's merger with Bonanza Air Lines and Pacific Air Lines to form Air West in 1968.

While successor Hughes Airwest never served Hailey and Sun Valley, they flew the Douglas DC-9-10 and McDonnell Douglas DC-9-30 jets into the Magic Valley Regional Airport (TWF) in Twin Falls, which was advertised in its various system timetables during the 1970s as being the "jet gateway" for Sun Valley.

=== Service during the 1970s & 1980s ===
Historically, in addition to the aforementioned West Coast Airlines and Air West propeller aircraft service, the airport had scheduled passenger jet flights provided in the past on a seasonal basis during the winter ski season operated by Horizon Air and America West Airlines. Horizon Air flew Fokker F28 Fellowship jets nonstop to San Francisco and Seattle while America West flew Boeing 737-300 jetliners nonstop to Los Angeles, Phoenix and Boise with direct, no change of plane jet service to Las Vegas and San Jose, CA. The Boeing 737 was the largest aircraft ever to serve Sun Valley on a scheduled basis. Following the cessation of these F28 and 737 flights, the airport did not have scheduled passenger jet service for many years until Delta Connection and United Express introduced Canadair CRJ-700 jet flights into Sun Valley in 2013 and 2014 respectively.

In the 1970s, the airport was served by Sun Valley Airlines (later "Sun Valley Key Airlines" which then changed its name to Key Airlines) using de Havilland Canada DHC-6 Twin Otter, Convair 440, Piper Navajo and other propeller-driven aircraft. The airfield was also briefly served over the years by Gem State Airlines, Mountain West Airlines, Golden Gate Airlines and Scenic Airlines. Transwestern Airlines provided service for two years, until sidelined by a non-fatality accident near Hailey in 1983 which involved an emergency landing attempt on Highway 75. It was acquired later that year by Horizon Air, which began service in the early 1980s. Air Idaho served the airport as well during the mid 1970s with de Havilland Heron four engine commuter prop aircraft.

== Present-day operations and service ==
Delta Air Lines has always been the dominant carrier at the airport with its service via Delta Connection. For many years, SkyWest Airlines with operated Embraer EMB-120 "Brasilia" turboprop aircraft under this name. In January 2014 this Delta Connection service was enhanced and expanded with SkyWest-operated Canadair CRJ-700 regional jet flights, following the retirement of the aging EMB-120 turboprops. Delta now operates with Embraer 175 jet service year-round service to Salt Lake City.

In 2013, United Airlines started seasonal service during the winter ski season, with nonstop service to/from San Francisco International Airport, which has continuously been operated by SkyWest Airlines with the CRJ 700 aircraft. In late 2013, United Express announced that it would expand its service to add nonstop summer flights from San Francisco. Soon after, United Express announced new nonstop service to Denver International Airport, which started in July 2014. As of July 2020, they are operating E175 aircraft on all routes.

Alaska Airlines, via its wholly owned regional partner Horizon Air, operates nonstop flights to Seattle with Embraer 175 aircraft. More flights operate during the winter ski season than any other time of year from the airport. Alaska Airlines usually has 100 days of service to Los Angeles from mid-December to late March. Horizon Air began serving Sun Valley late in 1983 with nonstop flights to Seattle and Boise, operated with Fairchild F-27 turboprop aircraft. On September 8, 2022 Horizon flew their final Dash 8 out of Freidman with service being replaced hours later by the E175.

== Airlines and destinations ==
| Airlines | Destinations |
|---|---|
| Aero | Charter: Los Angeles–Van Nuys |
| Alaska Airlines | Seattle/Tacoma; Seasonal: San Diego |
| American Eagle | Seasonal: Chicago–O'Hare, Phoenix–Sky Harbor |
| Delta Connection | Salt Lake City; Seasonal: Los Angeles, Seattle/Tacoma |
| United Express | Denver, Seasonal: Chicago–O'Hare, Los Angeles,San Francisco |

Destinations map
Destinations from Friedman Memorial Airport
Red = Year-round destination
Green = Seasonal destination

== Statistics ==
=== Top destinations ===
Busiest domestic routes from SUN (May 2025 – April 2026)
| Rank | City | Passengers | Carriers |
|---|---|---|---|
| 1 | Salt Lake City, Utah | 55,740 | Delta |
| 2 | Denver, Colorado | 31,980 | United |
| 3 | Seattle/Tacoma, Washington | 20,220 | Alaska, Delta |
| 4 | Los Angeles, California | 13,420 | Delta, United |
| 5 | San Francisco, California | 12,470 | United |
| 6 | Chicago, Illinois | 11,040 | American, United |
| 7 | Phoenix, Arizona | 3,070 | American |
| 8 | San Diego, California | 1,460 | Alaska |

== See also ==
- List of airports in Idaho
