= Simon J. Friedman =

American pioneer and merchant

Personal details
- Born: April 5, 1846 Germany
- Died: 1917 (aged 70–71) Hailey, Idaho
- Relatives: Simon M. Friedman, cousin

Simon J. Friedman (1846–1917), also known as S.J. Friedman, was a leading merchant and the first Jewish pioneer in Hailey, Idaho.

== Early life ==
Friedman was born in Germany to Jewish parents Itzig and Bertha (Usher) Friedman. In 1869, at 23 years old, he immigrated to the United States in 1869 along with his cousin Simon M. Friedman. Originally named Simon Itzig Friedman, he misspelled his middle initial (“I”) as a “J” when emigrating to the United States and the new name (S.J.) stuck.

Like many of the merchants who became Hailey’s founding residents, S.J. spent several years in Salt Lake City and small towns in Utah before finding his way to the recently established Idaho Territory in spring 1881 after hearing about the silver and lead discoveries in the Wood River Valley.

== Career ==
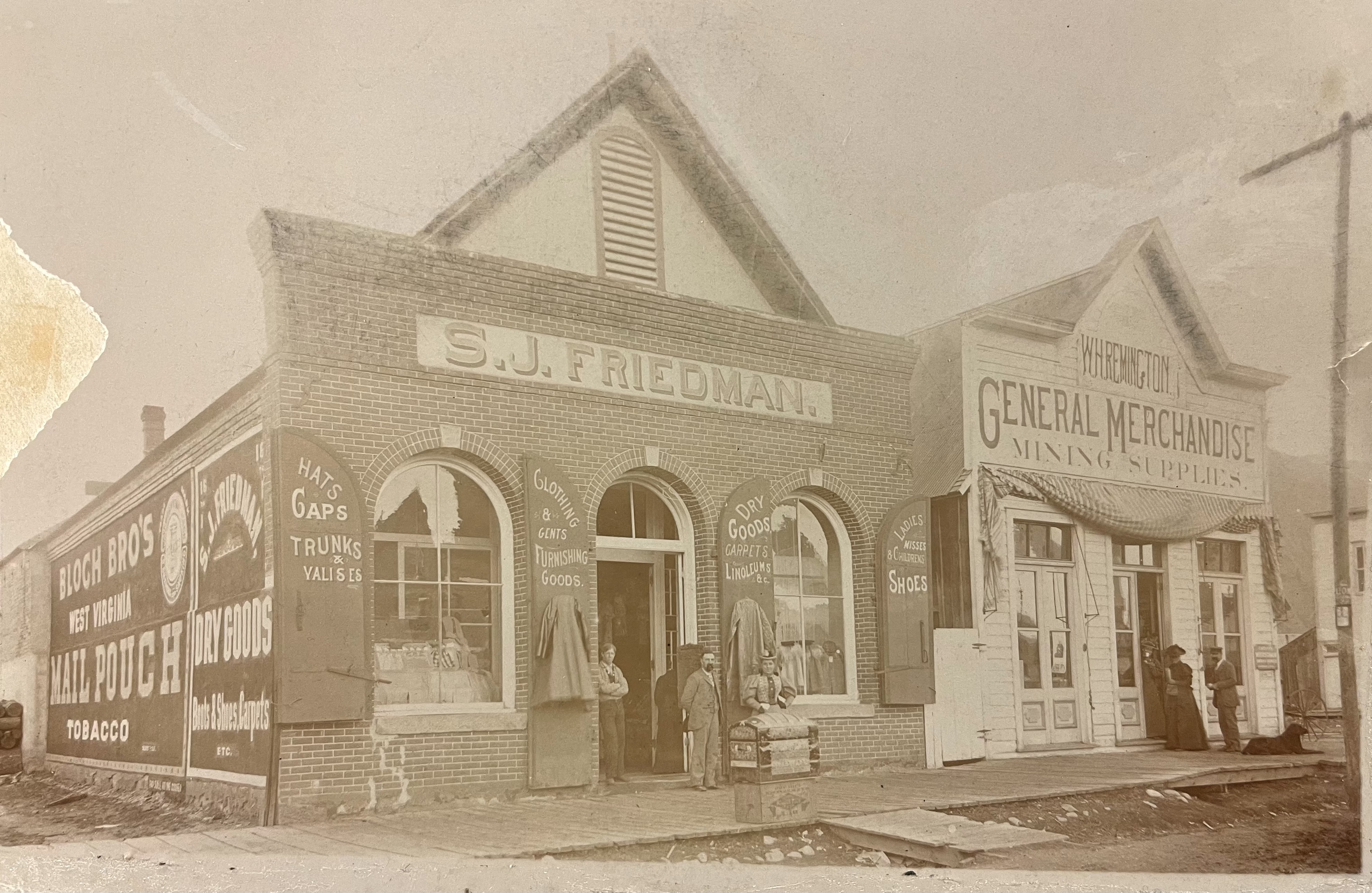
S.J. Friedman’s store, pictured here in the mid-1880s, sold dry goods. His cousin S.M. Friedman later opened a store next door in the building labeled here as W.H. Remington’s.

When Friedman arrived in Hailey in Spring 1881, the town had just been platted, so he set up a 20 by 40 foot tent and began selling dry goods, clothing, and boots. In fall 1881, he erected a permanent store in place of his tent.

When Hailey was destroyed by fire on July 2, 1889, S.J. Friedman’s store was one of the only buildings to survive. His construction methods in 1881 had been uniquely fireproof, including his decision to cover the windows with steel shutters and to pack a foot of dirt underneath the building’s roof. He remained trapped inside his store during the conflagration. According to the Wood River News-Miner, as Friedman watched the town burn around his store, he exclaimed “Shesus, see the old synagogue stand the test.”

After Friedman died in 1917, his family members continued to operate his store on Hailey’s Main Street.

== Jewish leadership ==
Friedman served as the unofficial leader of Hailey’s Jewish community, which boomed along with the town’s mining fortunes and peaked at several dozen people in the 1880s and early 1890s. In his home, Friedman owned and kept the community’s ritual objects, including prayer books, mezuzot, and Kiddush cups. He conducted Reform-style Jewish services in living rooms and social halls for Shabbat and holidays, including a Yom Kippur service in 1884 at Hailey's Masonic Lodge.

On at least two occasions, in 1886 and 1892, Friedman placed advertisements in the Wood River Times announcing the closure of his dry goods store for the High Holidays and asking patrons to place their orders before 6 PM on Erev Rosh Hashanah.

== Family ==
In April 1886, Friedman traveled to Salt Lake City and married Luscha Meyer (1864-1948), who moved back to Hailey with her new husband and served alongside him as a leading Jewish woman in the town. Friedman and Meyer raised four children in Hailey: Beatrice (1887-1963), Myrtle (1893-1990), Jerome (1894-1961), and Frederick (1898-1975). They lived in a home Friedman built at 123 Second Avenue N.

Like many of Hailey’s Jewish residents, the Friedman family maintained close ties to Salt Lake City even after settling in Hailey, both because they had once lived there and because it was the location of the nearest large Jewish community. When their son was born, Luscha sent for her brother, who traveled from Salt Lake City to Hailey to perform the brit milah. When the Friedmans died, they were both buried in Salt Lake City’s B’nai Israel Cemetery.
