= Sun Valley Magazine =

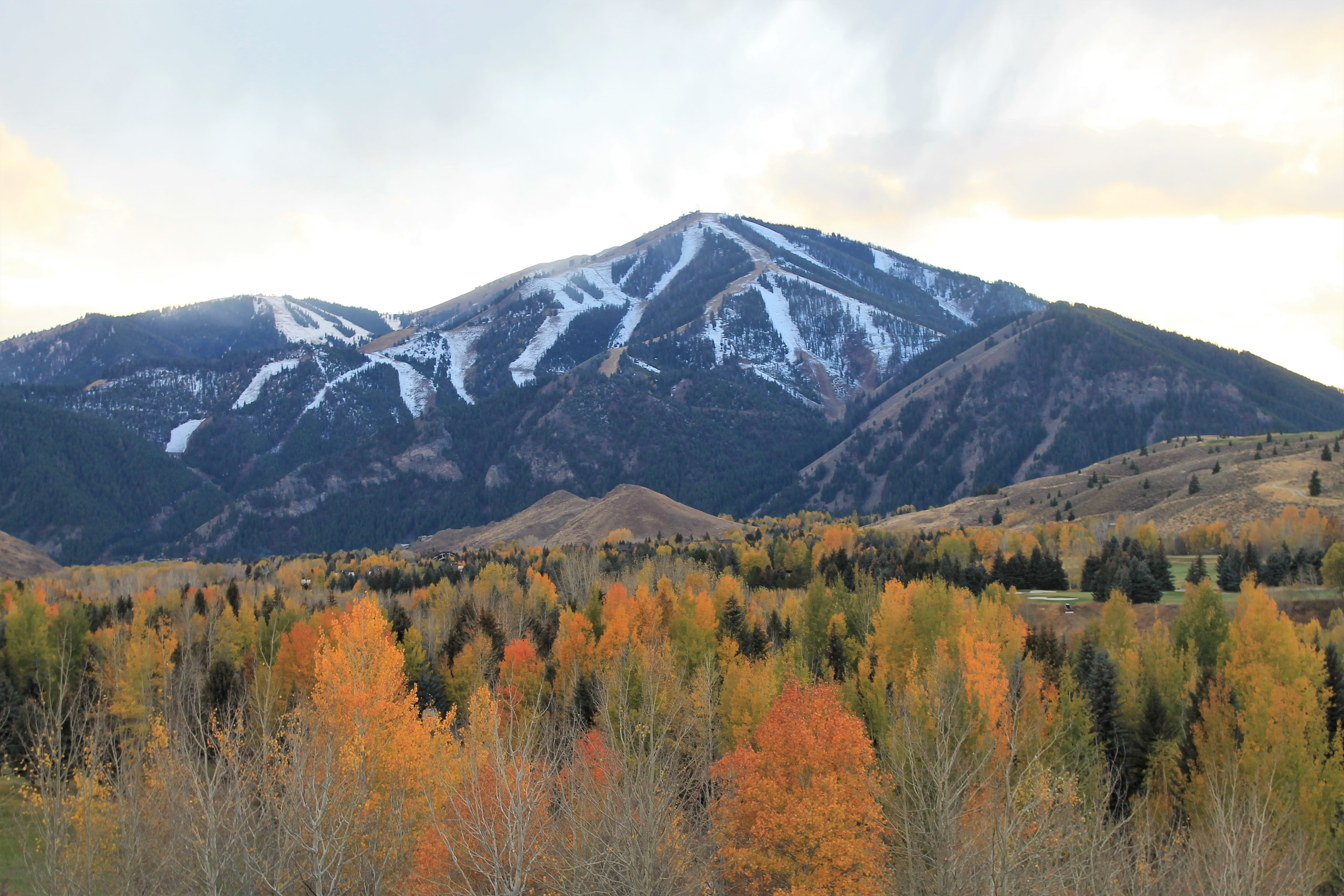
Bald Mountain in Sun Valley, Idaho

Sun Valley Magazine is a biannual local interest and lifestyle magazine headquartered in Hailey, Idaho which was established in 1973.

== History and profile ==
The magazine was launched in 1973. Michael Riedel was the owner of the magazine, and Laurie Sammis was the editor of the magazine between 1990 and 1993. Earls Communications acquired the magazine in 1993 and combined it with Valley Magazine. NW Publishing Group owned the magazine until December 2000 when Valley Publishing led by Laurie Sammis bought it. Since then Laurie Sammis has been owner and publisher of the magazine. The frequency of Sun Valley Magazine is biannual.

The magazine covers life in the area of Sun Valley, Idaho, including arts, food and drink, health and adventure. As Sun Valley is a town for outdoor recreation, Sun Valley Magazine's adventure section primarily focuses on the recreational activities in the region, such as skiing, hiking and mountain biking. Sun Valley Magazine also features articles on income-generating activities in Hailey, Idaho, such as beekeeping.
