= Sun Valley High School =

Sun Valley High School can refer to:

- Sun Valley High School (Arizona), Mesa, Arizona
- Sun Valley High School (California), Los Angeles, California
- Sun Valley High School (North Carolina), Monroe, North Carolina
- Sun Valley High School (Pennsylvania), Aston, Pennsylvania
