= Fox Motel House =

Historic house in Arkansas, United States

- U.S. National Register of Historic Places
- Location within Arkansas Location within the United States
- Location: AR 367, Bald Knob, Arkansas
- Coordinates: 35°18′51″N 91°33′55″W
- Area: less than one acre
- Built: 1925
- Architectural style: Bungalow/craftsman
- MPS: White County MPS
- NRHP reference No.: 91001267
- Added to NRHP: July 12, 1992

The Fox Motel House was a historic house on Arkansas Highway 367 in Bald Knob, Arkansas. Located on the northwest side, near the junction with United States Route 64, it was a single-story wood-frame structure with Craftsman styling. It had a porch extending across the front, with wooden posts on brick piers supporting it, and a spreading dormer projecting from the roof above. The dormer had broad eaves with exposed rafter tails. Built about 1925, it was one of Bald Knob's best examples of Craftsman architecture.

The house was listed on the National Register of Historic Places in 1992. It has been listed as destroyed in the Arkansas Historic Preservation Program database.

== See also ==
- National Register of Historic Places listings in White County, Arkansas
