= Herbert Allen Jr. =

American businessman (born 1940)

Herbert A. Allen Jr.
- Born: 1940 (age 85–86)
- Education: Williams College (B.A.)
- Known for: Former president of Allen & Company
- Spouses: Laura Parrish; Ann Reinking (m. 1982; div. 1989): Gail Holmes
- Children: 4, including Herbert Allen III
- Father: Herbert A. Allen Sr.

Herbert A. Allen Jr. (born 1940) is an American businessman and former president of Allen & Company.

== Biography ==
Herbert Allen Jr. is the son of Kathleen and Herbert A. Allen Sr. His father was a high school drop out and stock trader who joined in 1927 an investment firm founded in 1922 by his older brother Charles, Allen & Company. Allen & Company specialized in corporate buyouts. A third brother Harold joined soon after. Allen Jr. has one sister, Susan Allen. His mother was an Irish Catholic and his father - although the son of a Jewish mother - was a non-practicing Unitarian.

Allen Jr. was raised in Irvington, New York and graduated from Williams College in 1962 and immediately joined Allen & Company. In 1966, at age twenty-seven, he was appointed President. In 1973, Allen & Company purchased a controlling interest in Columbia Pictures. In 1982, Allen & Company launched the Sun Valley Conference and The Coca-Cola Company bought Columbia for $750 million in cash and stock giving Allen Jr. a seat on the Board of Directors.

In 2002, Allen Jr. ceded control of the firm to his son Herbert Allen III.

== Philanthropy ==
In 1998, he donated $20 million to Williams College.

== Personal life ==
Allen has been married and divorced three times. His first wife was Laura Parrish; they have four children: Herbert Allen III is married to Monica de la Torre, a public-interest lawyer and native of Puerto Rico; Charles Allen works at Allen & Co. as an institutional salesman and in 2005, married Kristin Wheat Fisher in a Methodist ceremony; Leslie Allen; and Christie Allen. His second wife was Broadway dancer Ann Reinking, whom he married in 1982 and divorced in 1989. After 1989 he married and has since divorced Gail Holmes. He resides in Cody, Wyoming.
