= Sun Valley, Honiara =

Sun Valley
- Suburb
- Location in Guadalcanal
- Coordinates: 9°26′S 159°57′E
- Country: Solomon Islands
- Province: Honiara Town
- Island: Guadalcanal
- Elevation: 29 m (95 ft)
- Time zone: UTC+11 (UTC)

Sun Valley is a suburb of Honiara, Solomon Islands located east of the main center and next to Honiara International Airport. There are Seventy-two households in Sun Valley community.

In 2014, consecutive days of rain caused by a tropical storm had blocked roads and flooded large parts of the area. Bridges were unpassable or washed away and electricity was intermittent. Rising water levels had caused damage to houses, properties had been washed away, houses washed out to sea, water is dirty and therefore not drinkable.

Accessing clean water had been a real challenge in this community. For years community members had been using the nearby Lunga River to access cooking and drinking water and for bathing and washing. In 2017, solar-powered water supply system, installed by World Vision. Today water can be accessed at home. The water system is powered by solar energy to draw water from a borehole and store it in a tank. The tank distributes water through five standpipes across the community.
