= KHLY =

- Hailey, Idaho; United States
- Broadcast area: Blaine County, Idaho
- Frequency: 1440 kHz

Programming
- Format: News-Talk Variety
- Affiliations: Independent

Ownership
- Owner: Scott Parker; (Sun Valley Media Group, LLC)

History
- First air date: January 1, 2020 (as KHLY), 2002 (as KBET)
- Former call signs: KBET (2002–2003); KPTO (2003–2005); KBET (2005); KPTO (2005–2019)
- Call sign meaning: K-HLY short for Hailey

Technical information
- Licensing authority: FCC
- Facility ID: 129638
- Class: D
- Power: 270 watts day 107 watts night
- Transmitter coordinates: 43°32′59″N 114°19′17″W
- Translator: 103.7 K279DA (Sun Valley)

Links
- Public license information: Public file; LMS

KHLY (1440 AM) is a radio station licensed to serve the community of Hailey, Idaho. The station is currently owned by Scott Parker through licensee Sun Valley Media Group, LLC.

== History ==
The call sign “KHLY” was first assigned to the World War II Liberty Ship SS PIERRE L’ENFANT, O.N. 243687 by the United States Coast Guard (USCG) built in 1943. The ship was sold in 1946 to commercial interests and after several owners, eventually grounded on the Black Sea near Tuapse and declared a total loss in 1970.

On September 5, 2019, the call sign was released and assigned to a commercial radio station at Hailey, Idaho by the U.S. Department of Homeland Security in cooperation with the USCG. Following that action, the Federal Communications Commission (FCC) then granted the call sign for use by the radio station.

The AM frequency was first licensed as KBET, on January 25, 2002 at Pocatello, Idaho, and renewed on December 1, 2005. In 2009, the Fifth District Court in Washington County, Utah appointed a receiver to take over the station for US Capital, of Boulder, Colorado - who foreclosed on Legacy Media, then owner of the station, along with several other stations. In 2013, the receiver sold the station in a District Court-approved sale to Main Street Broadcasting of Saint Anthony, Idaho. In 2014, the station was sold to Freedom's Voice Broadcasting Corporation of Salt Lake City, Utah. And subsequent to that and effective, March 27, 2017, the station sold to current owner, Sun Valley Media Group, LLC of Sun Valley. Shortly thereafter, the station was moved and its tower relocated from Bannock County to Blaine County, Idaho and also signed-on an associated FM translator station (K279DA 103.7 FM) to serve listeners in both the Wood River and Magic Valleys.
