= Greenhow and Rumsey Store Building =

- U.S. National Register of Historic Places
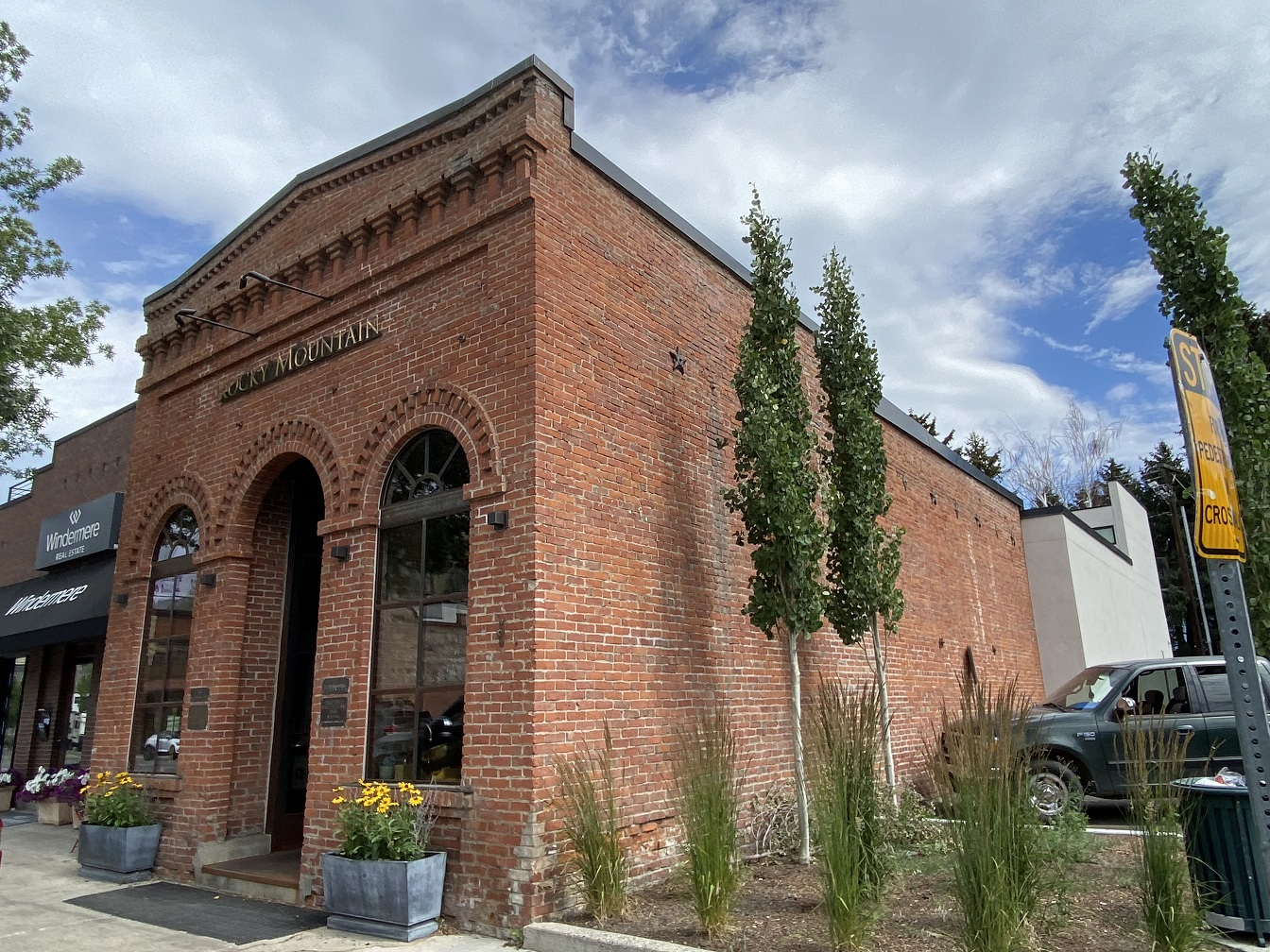
- Greenhow and Rumsey Store Building in 2023

- Location within Idaho Location within the United States
- Location: Main Ave. Ketchum, Idaho
- Coordinates: 43°40′48″N 114°21′47″W
- Area: less than one acre
- Built: 1884
- Architectural style: Romanesque, Romanesque Revival Influence
- NRHP reference No.: 83000280
- Added to NRHP: August 18, 1983

The Greenhow and Rumsey Store Building, on Main Ave. in Ketchum, Idaho is a historic building dating from 1884. It is listed on the National Register of Historic Places (NRHP).

Also known as the Golden Rule Store, it includes Romanesque Revival influence in its architecture. It was a department store in C.C. Anderson's Idaho chain of Golden Rule Store brand stores.

The building was listed on the National Register of Historic Places in 1983.
