= Fox–Worswick House =

Historic house in Idaho, United States

- Fox-Worswick House
- U.S. National Register of Historic Places
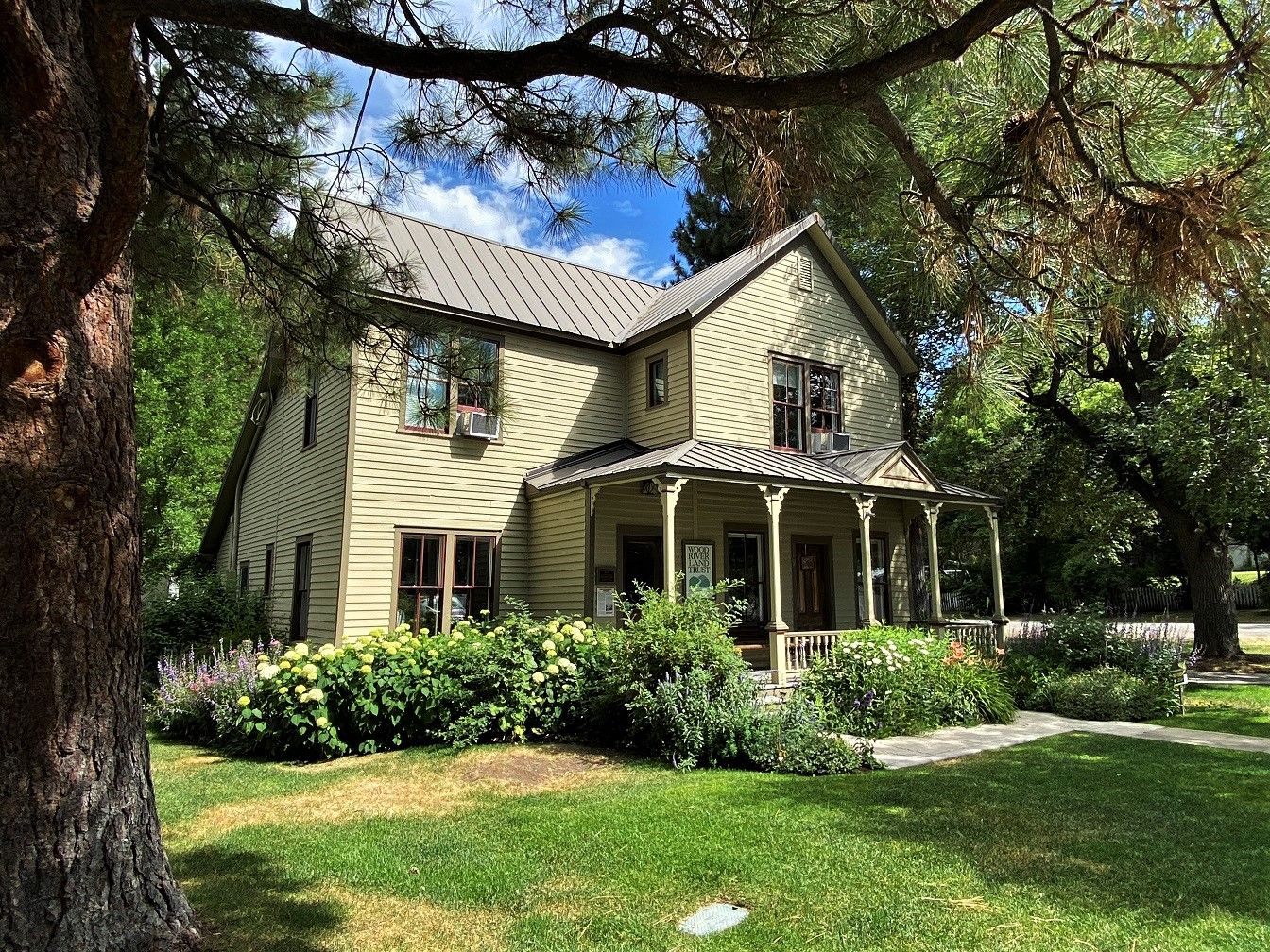
- Fox-Worswick House in 2023

- Location within Idaho Location within the United States
- Location: 119 E. Bullion St. Hailey, Idaho
- Coordinates: 43°31′15″N 114°18′48″W
- Built: 1881
- NRHP reference No.: 11000613
- Added to NRHP: August 31, 2011

The Fox–Worswick House, also known as the E. A. Worswick Home, located at 119 E. Bullion St. in Hailey, Idaho, United States is a historic house whose original structure was a log cabin built in 1881 when Hailey was founded. The property was bought for $25 by Dr. C. B. Fox from John Hailey; it was sold six times before 1919. The log cabin has since been expanded but an interior log wall remains. The house was restored to a turn-of-the-20th-century style by the Wood River Land Trust, owners since 2000.

It was listed on the National Register of Historic Places in 2011.
