= Weaver–Fox House =

Historic house in Maryland, United States

- U.S. National Register of Historic Places
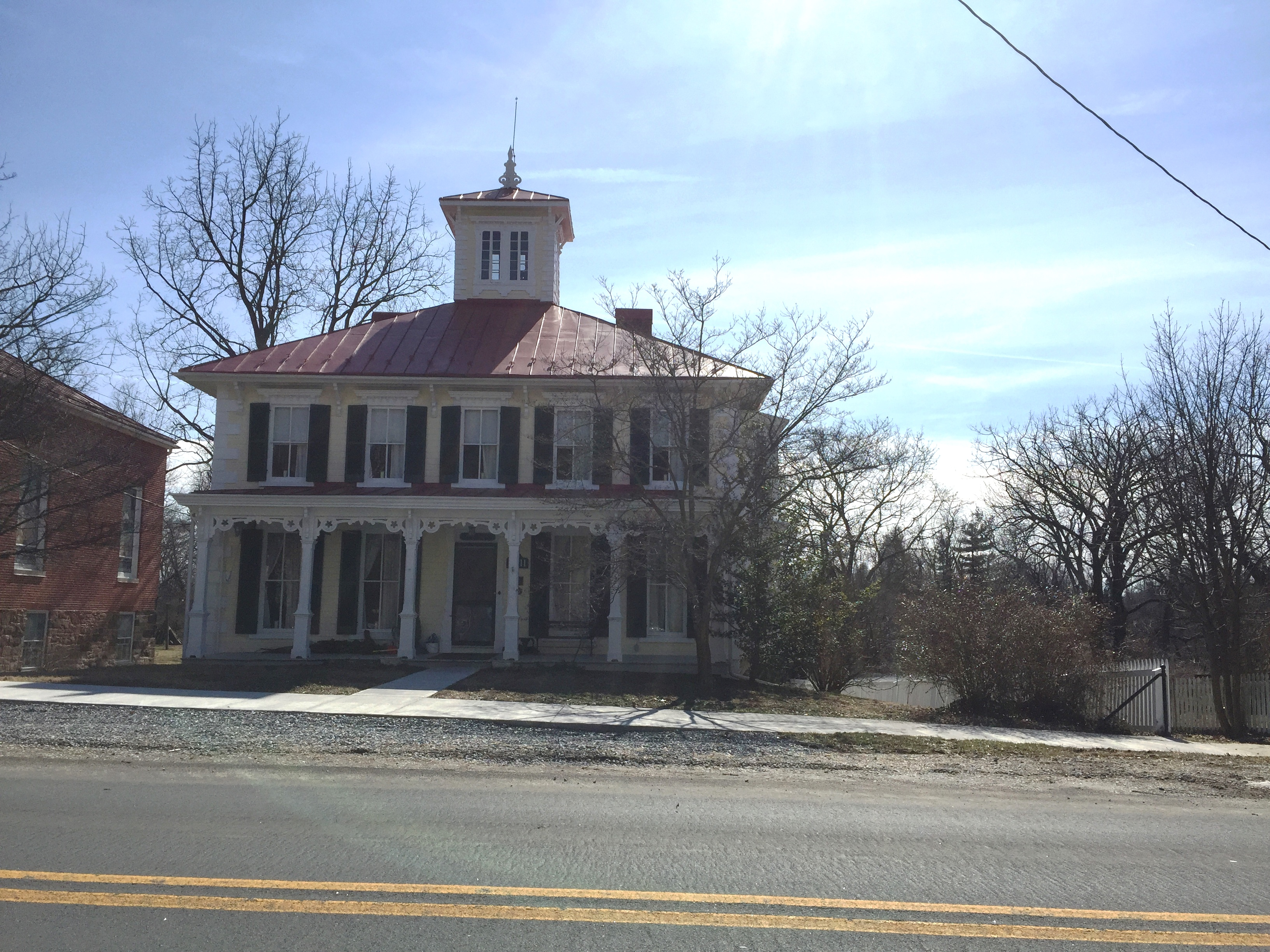

- Location within Maryland Location within the United States
- Location: 3411 Main St. (Uniontown Rd.), Uniontown, Maryland
- Coordinates: 39°35′36.5″N 77°6′51.9″W
- Area: 0.5 acres (0.20 ha)
- Built: 1874
- Architectural style: Italianate Villa
- NRHP reference No.: 75000876
- Added to NRHP: November 20, 1975

The Weaver–Fox House is a historic home located at Uniontown, Carroll County, Maryland, United States. It is a simplified Victorian Italianate villa, two stories high with a hip roof. It features two chimneys flanking a rectangular, hipped roof cupola. The house was built during the years 1874 and 1875 as the home of Dr. Jacob J. Weaver, Jr., a country physician.

The Weaver–Fox House was listed on the National Register of Historic Places in 1975.
