= Simon M. Friedman =

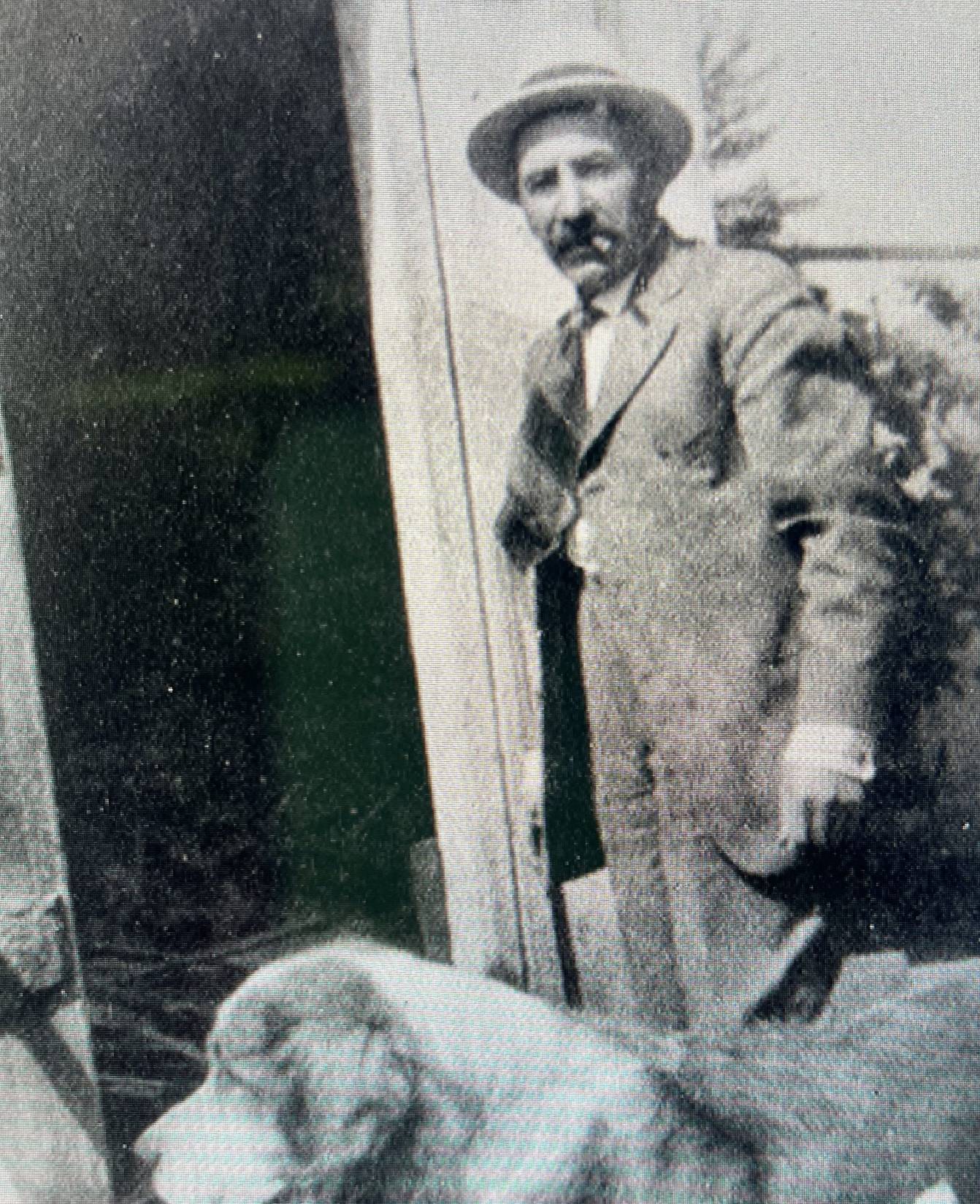

1st Mayor of Hailey
- In office April 12, 1909 – April 13, 1913
- Preceded by: position established
- Succeeded by: H.R. Plughoff

2nd Chairman of the Board of Hailey
- In office April 8, 1907 – April 11, 1909
- Preceded by: Albert Wolters
- Succeeded by: position eliminated

Personal details
- Born: 1852 Germany
- Died: 1926 (aged 73–74) Hailey, Idaho
- Relatives: Simon J. Friedman, cousin

Simon Moses Friedman (1852-1926), also known as S.M. Friedman, was a leading merchant and politician in Hailey, Idaho and the namesake of Hailey's Friedman Memorial Airport.

== Early life ==
Friedman was born to a Jewish family in Germany and immigrated to the United States in 1869 along with his cousin S.J. Friedman. After his cousin settled in Hailey in 1881, S.M. Friedman followed in 1886 or 1887.

== Career ==
Friedman began his life in Hailey as a sheep and cattle rancher. Some sources credit Friedman with bringing the first sheep to the Wood River Valley, while others credit John Hailey or James Laidlaw.

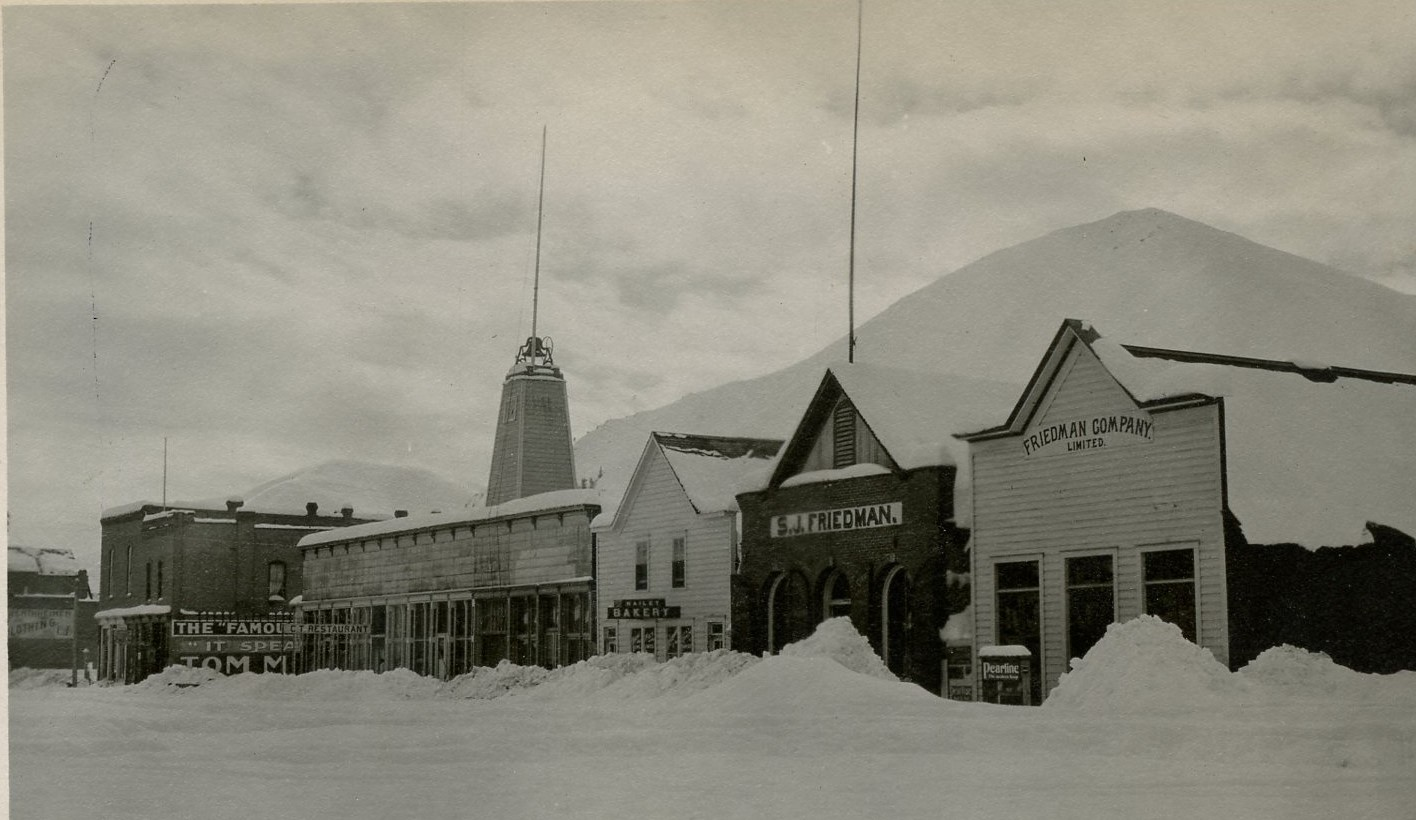
S.M. Friedman's store, pictured here along Hailey's Main Street in the early 1900s, operated immediately next door to his cousin S.J. Friedman's store.

On July 2, 1889, a large fire destroyed almost all of Hailey's business district. After the fire, Friedman opened a store on the town's Main Street immediately next door to his cousin's store. S.M. Friedman's store sold hardware, mining supplies, and general merchandise, but, according to a 1977 oral history with his daughter Lucile, his heart remained with his livestock—which he kept even while he pursued mercantile interests.

When the Village of Hailey was formally incorporated in 1903, Friedman joined the Village's Board of Trustees, and he became the third Chairman of the Board in 1907. In 1909, the Village officially became the City of Hailey, and Friedman became its first mayor. He was reelected to a second two-year term in 1911. Through different forms of government, Friedman was Hailey's chief executive for seven years from 1907 to 1913, a role in which he established the first city water supply.

Lucile Friedman said that her father "always felt that everybody here was... an American citizen. [Since he] was rescued from Germany, he should get down and kiss the soil of the United States. They should be so grateful to be an American citizen. So he felt that you had great responsibility to your country and you should be active in doing things." She added this about the end of her father's political career: "He [served as mayor] for two terms, and my mother said, 'If you [run for] another term, I'm going to divorce you.' It was anything but pleasurable… somebody was always getting Dad out in the middle of the night to get a cow out of their yard or something."

== Family ==
Friedman married Selma Rosenthal (1867-1941) in the 1880s. Rosenthal remained in Salt Lake City for a period of time after Friedman moved to Hailey, but she joined him in Hailey after she noticed "how lonely it was for him up here all by himself," according to the 1977 oral history.

They lived at 215 E Silver Street in Hailey and raised three children there: Leon (1888-1966), Lucile (1894-1987), and Marian (1903-1947). Leon left to attend military academy in California and then returned to Hailey, assuming ownership over his father's store in 1926. Lucile also left, attending the University of California for four years, but she returned to Hailey and became the manager of the Hiawatha Hotel. Marian died a tragic death in Boise.

== Legacy ==
In 1931, Leon and Lucile Friedman deeded a 76-acre parcel of their father's former farmland to the City of Hailey for use as an airstrip, with the condition that the property would revert back to the Friedman heirs if the land ever ceased to be used for its intended purpose. The airstrip was expanded into an airport years later, as the valley's resort economy grew and commercial flight traffic grew along with it.

As of 2022, Friedman Memorial Airport hosts hundreds of commercial jets each year and is one of few airports anywhere in the world named for a Jewish person.
