= J. C. Fox Building =

- Fox, J. C., Building
- U.S. National Register of Historic Places
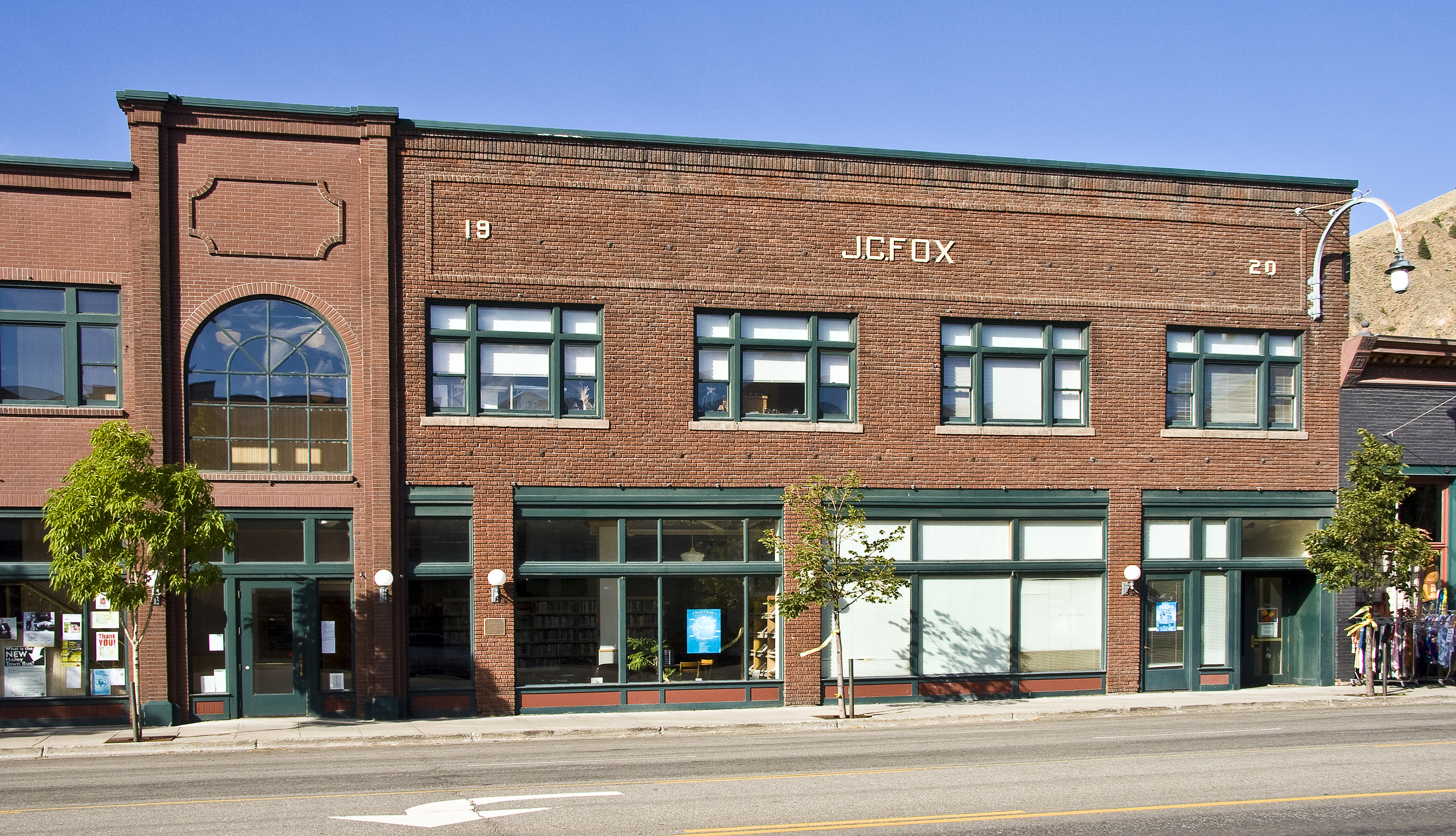

- Location within Idaho Location within the United States
- Location: 115 S. Main St., Hailey, Idaho
- Coordinates: 43°31′8″N 114°18′51″W
- Area: less than one acre
- Built: 1920
- Architectural style: Early Commercial
- NRHP reference No.: 83000279
- Added to NRHP: March 31, 1983

The J. C. Fox Building, located at 115 S. Main St. in Hailey, Idaho, is a historic building built in 1920. It is listed on the National Register of Historic Places (NRHP).

The building was heated by water from Hailey Hot Springs piped about two miles. The building held a saloon and the First National Bank of Bailey; later it hosted a 10-room hospital on the second floor, so many Hailey residents were born above a saloon. Dr. Earl Wellman Fox, John Corson's son, served the community as doctor for 41 years.

The building is an example of Early Commercial style architecture. It was listed on the National Register in 1983.
