= Allen & Company Sun Valley Conference =

Annual American business conference

The Allen & Company Sun Valley Conference is an annual media finance conference hosted and funded by the private investment firm Allen & Company. The conference has taken place in Sun Valley, Idaho, for one week each July since 1983. The gathering typically includes major political figures, business leaders, and figures in the philanthropic and cultural spheres. The Sun Valley Conference is considered to be of particular importance in initiating and concluding corporate deals and in networking within elites in the media and business sectors.

== The meeting ==
Every July, the Sun Valley Conference takes place at Sun Valley Lodge, a luxury ski resort, in Idaho and lasts four days. Meetings are private and include recreational activities such as hiking, rafting and golf, lectures to suit the meeting's agenda, and evening cocktail parties and dinners. Most guests travel on their private jets to the town. Guests are also allowed to bring their families. Due to the informal yet exclusive atmosphere, the meeting was also called a “summer camp for billionaires”.

== History ==
The Sun Valley Conference was founded in 1983 by Herbert Allen Jr. The first conference had 35 participants and Allen as the sole speaker. Beginning in the early 1990s, Berkshire Hathaway CEO Warren Buffett (an investor in Coca-Cola) became a regular attendee. The main attendees are the heads of large media groups and companies. Over time, the number of participants has increased significantly and in 2012 there were already 628 names on the participant list. Recently, Silicon Valley figureheads have been among the most prominent attendees, including Mark Zuckerberg, Jeff Bezos, Tim Cook, Sergey Brin, Sundar Pichai, Elon Musk and Sam Altman. Various important business were rumored to be concluded at the meeting, such as the merger of Disney and ABC News in 1996 and the takeover of The Washington Post by Jeff Bezos in 2012.

== Notable guests ==
Previous conference guests have included:

- Bill and Melinda Gates
- Jeff Bezos
- Elon Musk
- Warren and Susan Buffett
- Tony Blair
- Google founders Larry Page and Sergey Brin
- Allen alumnus and former Philippine Senator Mar Roxas
- former Google Chairman Eric Schmidt
- Quicken Loans Founder & Chairman Dan Gilbert
- Yahoo! co-founder Jerry Yang
- financer George Soros
- Facebook founder Mark Zuckerberg
- media tycoon Rupert Murdoch
- eBay CEO Meg Whitman
- BET founder Robert Johnson
- Time Warner Chairman Richard Parsons
- Nike founder and chairman Phil Knight
- Dell founder and CEO Michael Dell
- NBA player LeBron James
- professor and entrepreneur Sebastian Thrun
- Governor Chris Christie
- entertainer Dan Chandler
- Katharine Graham of The Washington Post
- Diane Sawyer
- InterActiveCorp Chairman Barry Diller
- Linkedin co-founder Reid Hoffman
- entrepreneur Wences Casares
- EXOR and FCA Chairman John Elkann
- Washington Post CEO Donald E. Graham
- Ivanka Trump and Jared Kushner
- Bob Iger
- Warner Bros. Discovery CEO David Zaslav
- Oprah Winfrey
- Sam Altman
- Satya Nadella
- Kevin Scott
- several former CIA directors, including Mike Pompeo, George Tenet, Michael Morell and David Petraeus

== See also ==
- Allen & Company
- Herbert Allen, Jr.
