= Wood River Valley =

Region in Idaho, USA

Coordinates: 43°30′53″N 114°18′22″W

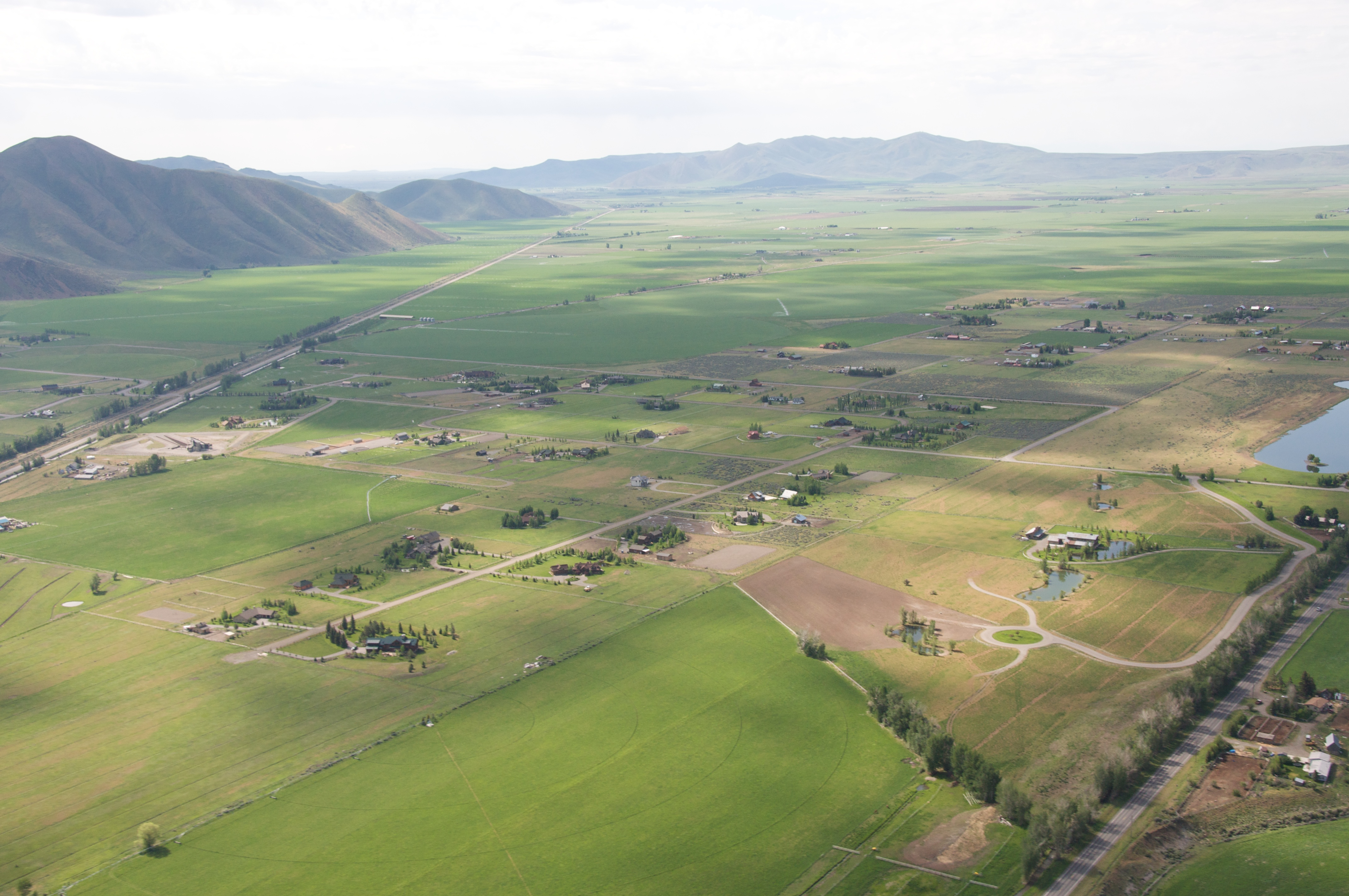
Aerial view of Wood River Valley in 2009

Location in the United States
Location in Idaho

The Wood River Valley is a region in south-central Idaho. Located in Blaine County, it is named after the Big Wood and Little Wood Rivers, which flow through the area.

The valley has four incorporated cities: Bellevue, Hailey, Ketchum, and Sun Valley. It is considered part of the larger Magic Valley region, but differs economically due to its ties to the tourism industry, with less of a dependence on agriculture than in the southern Magic Valley proper.

The Sun Valley Resort is at the north end of the valley; the region also includes large portions of the Sawtooth National Forest and Sawtooth National Recreation Area.

The primary roadway is State Highway 75, the Sawtooth Scenic Byway. Friedman Memorial Airport and Wood River High School serve the valley and are both located in Hailey, the county seat of Blaine County, Idaho.

== Notable people ==
- John Baldwin Neil (1842–1902), residing in the valley while involved in mining operations after serving as governor of Idaho Territory from 1880 to 1883
- Bowe Bergdahl (born 1986), the last U.S. soldier captured during the War in Afghanistan after deserting his post.
