= Hailey, Idaho =

City in and county seat of Blaine County, Idaho, United States

- City
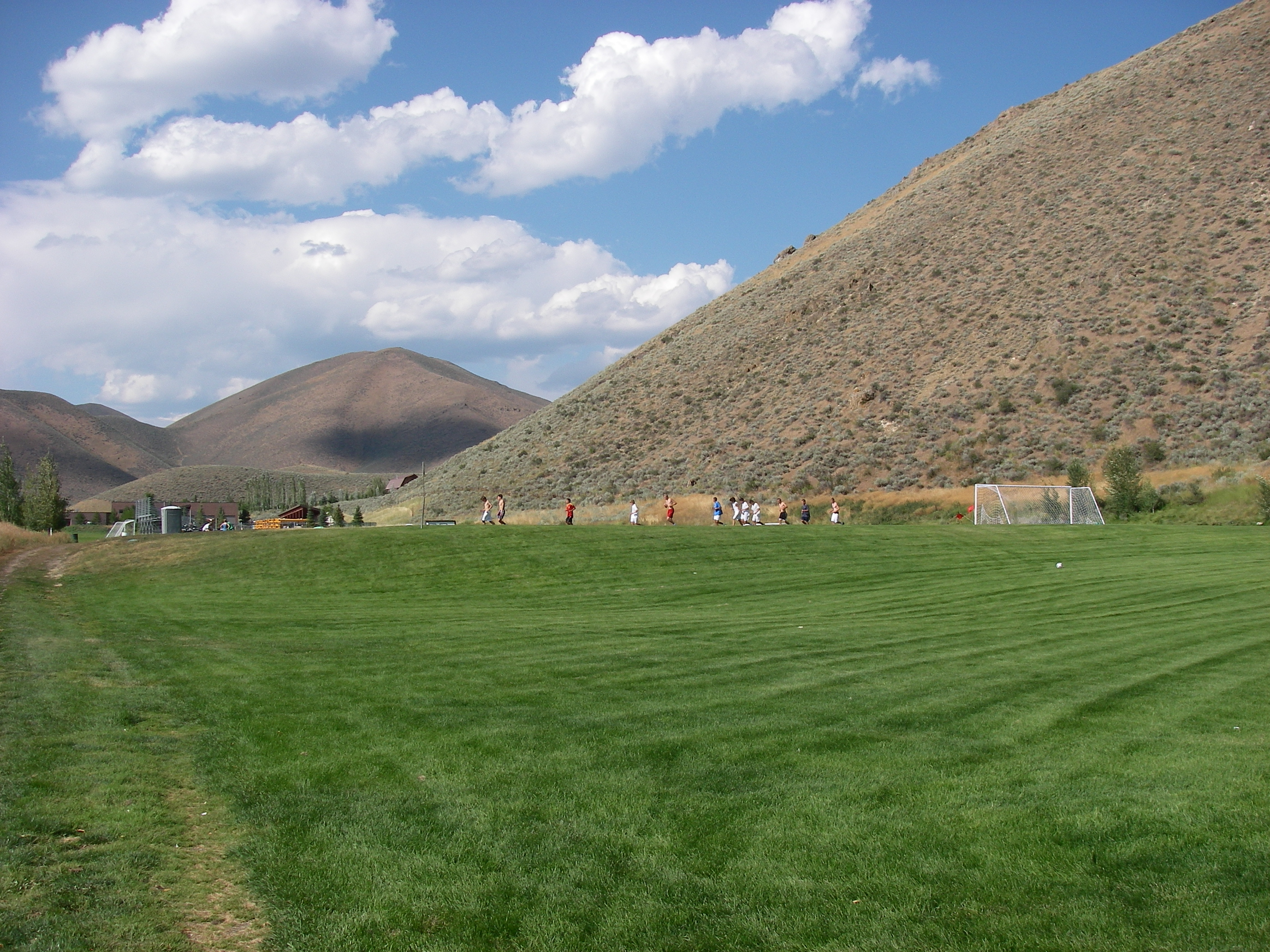
- Soccer fields in Hailey (2009)

- Location of Hailey in Blaine County, Idaho.

- Location in Idaho Location in the United States
- Coordinates: 43°30′18″N 114°17′12″W
- Country: United States
- State: Idaho
- County: Blaine

Area
  - Total: 3.93 sq mi (10.19 km^{2})
  - Land: 3.93 sq mi (10.18 km^{2})
  - Water: 0.0039 sq mi (0.01 km^{2})
- Elevation: 5,322 ft (1,622 m)

Population (2020)
  - Total: 9,161
  - Density: 2,331/sq mi (899.9/km^{2})
- Time zone: UTC-7 (Mountain (MST))
  - Summer (DST): UTC-6 (MDT)
- ZIP code: 83333
- Area codes: 208, 986
- FIPS code: 16-34390
- GNIS feature ID: 2410681
- Website: www.haileycityhall.org

Hailey is a city in and the county seat of Blaine County, in the Wood River Valley of the central part of the U.S. state of Idaho. The population was 9,161 at the 2020 census, up from 7,960 in 2010. Hailey is the site of Friedman Memorial Airport (SUN), the airport for the resort area of Sun Valley/Ketchum, 12 miles (19 km) north. The town of Bellevue is a few miles south. From 1882 to 1895, Hailey was the county seat of now-defunct Alturas County.

The city is named after John Hailey, a two-time Congressional delegate from the Idaho Territory.

== Demographics ==
Historical population
Census	Pop.	Note	%±
1910	1,231		—
1920	1,201		−2.4%
1930	973		−19.0%
1940	1,443		48.3%
1950	1,464		1.5%
1960	1,185		−19.1%
1970	1,425		20.3%
1980	2,109		48.0%
1990	3,687		74.8%
2000	6,200		68.2%
2010	7,960		28.4%
2020	9,161		15.1%
U.S. Decennial Census

=== 2020 census ===
As of the 2020 census, Hailey had a population of 9,161. The median age was 38.8 years. 25.9% of residents were under the age of 18 and 14.0% of residents were 65 years of age or older. For every 100 females there were 96.7 males, and for every 100 females age 18 and over there were 97.0 males age 18 and over.

100.0% of residents lived in urban areas, while 0.0% lived in rural areas.

There were 3,477 households in Hailey, of which 38.1% had children under the age of 18 living in them. Of all households, 49.3% were married-couple households, 17.7% were households with a male householder and no spouse or partner present, and 25.6% were households with a female householder and no spouse or partner present. About 25.0% of all households were made up of individuals and 11.1% had someone living alone who was 65 years of age or older.

There were 3,761 housing units, of which 7.6% were vacant. The homeowner vacancy rate was 1.0% and the rental vacancy rate was 4.2%.

Racial composition as of the 2020 census
Race	Number	Percent
White	6,194	67.6%
Black or African American	17	0.2%
American Indian and Alaska Native	85	0.9%
Asian	105	1.1%
Native Hawaiian and Other Pacific Islander	3	0.0%
Some other race	1,741	19.0%
Two or more races	1,016	11.1%
Hispanic or Latino (of any race)	2,869	31.3%

=== 2010 census ===
As of the census of 2010, there were 7,960 people, 3,065 households, and 2,053 families residing in the city. The population density was 2,180.8 inhabitants per square mile (842.0/km^{2}). There were 3,527 housing units at an average density of 966.3 per square mile (373.1/km^{2}). The racial makeup of the city was 80.2% White, 0.2% African American, 0.7% Native American, 0.8% Asian, 0.1% Pacific Islander, 16.2% from other races, and 1.9% from two or more races. Hispanic or Latino of any race were 28.1% of the population.

There were 3,065 households, of which 41.0% had children under the age of 18 living with them, 51.1% were married couples living together, 11.0% had a female householder with no husband present, 5.0% had a male householder with no wife present, and 33.0% were non-families. Of all households 25.8% were made up of individuals, and 6% had someone living alone who was 65 years of age or older. The average household size was 2.58 and the average family size was 3.15.

The median age in the city was 35.1 years. 28.6% of residents were under the age of 18; 6.7% were between the ages of 18 and 24; 29.8% were from 25 to 44; 28.3% were from 45 to 64; and 6.5% were 65 years of age or older. The gender makeup of the city was 50.0% male and 50.0% female.

=== 2000 census ===
As of the census of 2000, there were 6,200 people, 2,389 households, and 1,603 families residing in the city. The population density was 1,959.3 inhabitants per square mile (756.5/km^{2}). There were 2,557 housing units at an average density of 808.1 per square mile (312.0/km^{2}). The racial makeup of the city was 89.68% White, 0.26% African American, 0.35% Native American, 1.08% Asian, 0.05% Pacific Islander, 7.02% from other races, and 1.56% from two or more races. Hispanic or Latino of any race were 11.95% of the population.

There were 2,389 households, out of which 42.6% had children under the age of 18 living with them, 51.5% were married couples living together, 10.2% had a female householder with no husband present, and 32.9% were non-families. 23.7% of all households were made up of individuals, and 5.2% had someone living alone who was 65 years of age or older. The average household size was 2.56 and the average family size was 3.09.

In the city, the population was spread out, with 29.7% under the age of 18, 6.7% from 18 to 24, 37.4% from 25 to 44, 20.9% from 45 to 64, and 5.3% who were 65 years of age or older. The median age was 33 years. For every 100 females, there were 99.6 males. For every 100 females age 18 and over, there were 96.9 males.

The median income for a household in the city was $51,347, and the median income for a family was $56,379. Males had a median income of $37,750 versus $29,025 for females. The per capita income for the city was $21,255. About 4.6% of families and 6.1% of the population were below the poverty line, including 7.3% of those under age 18 and 4.2% of those age 65 or over.

== Geography ==
According to the United States Census Bureau, the city has a total area of 3.65 square miles (9.45 km^{2}), all of it land.

Hailey has a continental Mediterranean climate (Köppen Dsb). Winters are cold and snowy: there are an average of forty-four days each year which fail to top 32 °F or 0 °C, whilst 199 nights fall below freezing and nineteen nights between November and March will fall to or below 0 °F or −17.8 °C. Spring warms up slowly, with snow falling as late as May. Summer is hot during the day, but cools off into the 40s or 50s at night. Highs reach 90 °F or 32.2 °C on only 15 days per year, and only July has made it to 100 °F or 37.8 °C. Freezing nights can happen any time of the year, even in July and August. There is little rain, coming only as isolated showers or storms a few times per month. Most days are sunny and this is the driest part of the year. Fall starts warm in September and then quickly cools off. Snow has fallen in September, but usually holds off until October. Early fall is dry and sunny like summer. Days in the 70s can happen well into October, but −20 °F or −28.9 °C has been recorded in November. The lowest temperature recorded was −28 °F (−33.3 °C) on January 12, 1963 and the record high is 100 °F (37.8 °C) on July 19, 1953. Precipitation falls primarily as snow in winter and as thunderstorms in late spring. The rest of the year is mostly dry.

Climate data for Hailey 1948–2005, records 1948–1988
Month	Jan	Feb	Mar	Apr	May	Jun	Jul	Aug	Sep	Oct	Nov	Dec	Year
Record high °F (°C)	52 (11)	60 (16)	68 (20)	80 (27)	93 (34)	98 (37)	100 (38)	98 (37)	96 (36)	84 (29)	70 (21)	58 (14)	100 (38)
Mean daily maximum °F (°C)	30.2 (−1.0)	36.5 (2.5)	42.0 (5.6)	55.2 (12.9)	65.5 (18.6)	74.4 (23.6)	84.8 (29.3)	83.6 (28.7)	74.1 (23.4)	61.5 (16.4)	44.4 (6.9)	33.0 (0.6)	57.1 (14.0)
Mean daily minimum °F (°C)	7.8 (−13.4)	12.7 (−10.7)	18.8 (−7.3)	28.8 (−1.8)	36.6 (2.6)	42.8 (6.0)	48.9 (9.4)	47.4 (8.6)	39.3 (4.1)	31.2 (−0.4)	21.0 (−6.1)	11.3 (−11.5)	28.9 (−1.7)
Record low °F (°C)	−28 (−33)	−23 (−31)	−13 (−25)	6 (−14)	16 (−9)	22 (−6)	29 (−2)	28 (−2)	17 (−8)	7 (−14)	−27 (−33)	−25 (−32)	−28 (−33)
Average precipitation inches (mm)	2.58 (66)	1.82 (46)	1.23 (31)	1.05 (27)	1.49 (38)	1.31 (33)	0.43 (11)	0.63 (16)	0.75 (19)	0.72 (18)	1.57 (40)	2.30 (58)	15.88 (403)
Average snowfall inches (cm)	25.4 (65)	15.1 (38)	7.9 (20)	1.1 (2.8)	0.8 (2.0)	0 (0)	0 (0)	0 (0)	0.1 (0.25)	0.8 (2.0)	7.5 (19)	22.5 (57)	81.2 (206.05)
Average precipitation days (≥ 0.01 in)	9	6	6	5	7	7	3	3	4	4	6	8	68

== Education ==
The Blaine County School System is the school district for the entire county. Headquartered in Hailey, it provides several schools for local children.

Hailey Elementary, the zoned elementary school, is located in the center of Hailey. Alturas Elementary, a magnet school, is located in the south of the city. Prior to 2014, it was named Woodside Elementary School, and was a zoned elementary school for southern Hailey.

Wood River Middle School, the zoned middle school, lies north of downtown, and Wood River High School sits near the Foxmoor subdivision.

The Silver Creek Alternative School provides a different avenue for students who have struggled in a typical school setting.

The county is in the catchment area, but not the taxation zone, for College of Southern Idaho. The College of Southern Idaho's Blaine County Center, formerly the Baline County Off Campus Center, is located in Hailey.

Private education options in the area include the Sage School in Hailey for 6th through 12th grade students and the Community School in neighboring Sun Valley for elementary through high school students.

== Outdoor life ==
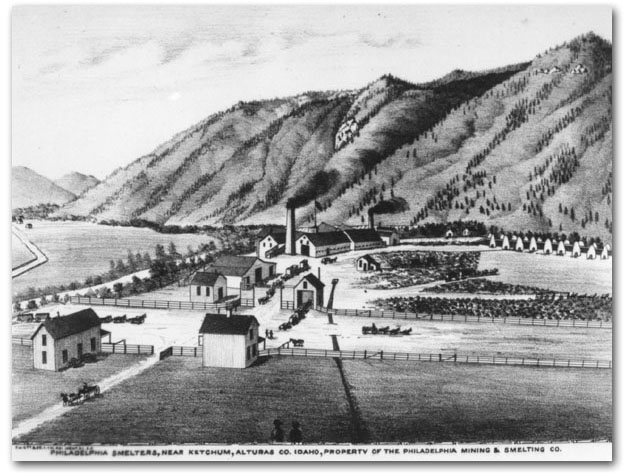
Philadelphia Smelter in Hailey, Idaho, 1884

Hailey is surrounded by the Sawtooth National Forest. Activities such as hiking, biking, skiing, snowboarding, BMX riding, skateboarding, horseback riding, ice skating and fly fishing are popular in Hailey. Hailey was home to the Sun Valley Polo Club until 1999.

West of town, Hailey has its own ski hill called Rotarun Ski Area, which is much smaller than its local cousin at the Sun Valley Resort.

Other mountains in Hailey are Carbonate, Red Devil Peak (6594 ft.), and Della (6729 ft.). These mountains are popular for hiking, mountain biking, dog walking and other outdoor activities.

== Friedman Memorial Airport ==
The Friedman Memorial Airport provides direct flights to Salt Lake City, and Seattle most year round. Direct flights to Los Angeles, Denver, San Francisco and Chicago are available seasonally. The airport has a private terminal for small jets. Herbert Allen Jr.'s annual summer executive retreat, Allen & Company Sun Valley Conference is a regular client of Friedman Memorial Airport. Idaho Highway 75 runs past the airport.

Friedman Memorial Airport is named for Simon Moses Friedman, a Jewish merchant and sheep rancher who settled in Hailey in the 1880s and was elected its first mayor when the city was incorporated in 1909. His children Leon and Lucile Friedman donated the land for the airport to the city in 1931.

== Publications and media ==
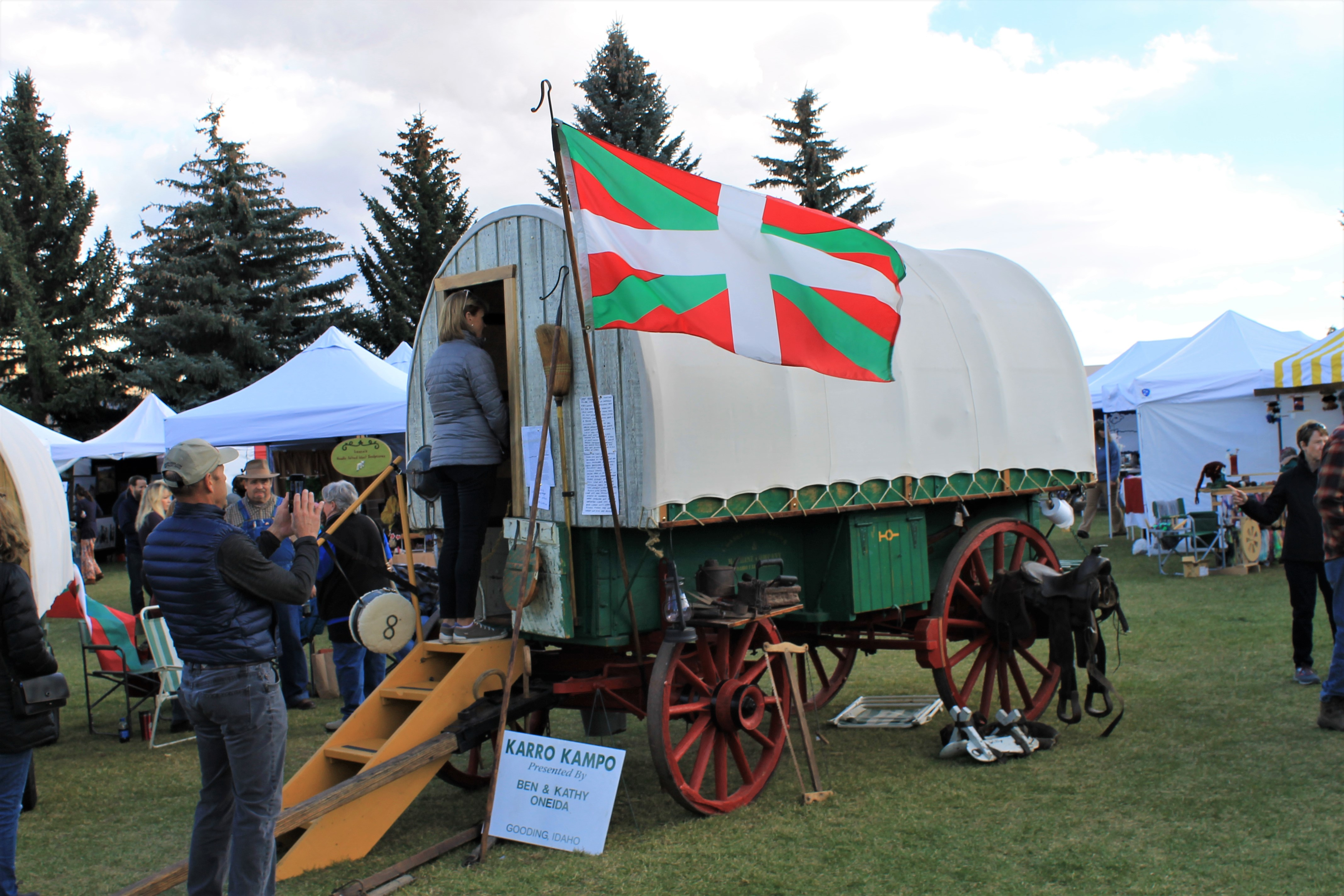
Basque Wagon at Trailing of the Sheep Festival in Hailey

Hailey is the home to Sun Valley Magazine, a quarterly publication focusing on fine dining, real estate and local events. Hailey has two local newspapers: The Idaho Mountain Express and The Weekly Sun. The Idaho Mountain Express is located in Ketchum and is published every Wednesday and Friday. The Weekly Sun is located in Hailey and is published every Wednesday.

Snowboard Magazine was founded in Hailey, Idaho in the year 2004 by local resident Mark Sullivan. The magazine quickly grew to the 3rd largest snowboarding publication in the world before being sold to Storm Mountain Publishing in 2007.

KHLY at 1440 AM is Hailey’s only AM radio station and repeated in Sun Valley at 103.7 FM. KECH at 95.3 FM is another local radio station based in Hailey and licensed to the city of Sun Valley along with KSKI-FM at 94.5 FM.

Plum TV premiered in 2007 from Hailey, Idaho. Plum TV was a boutique network serving resort communities. Plum TV ultimately went bankrupt and their Hailey and Ketchum LPTV (low power television) licenses were surrendered back to the Federal Communications Commission (FCC). The community of Hailey is currently served by Cox Cable carriage of full power, network affiliated, nearby television stations KMVT Channel 11 CBS Twin Falls, KSVT Channel 14 FOX Twin Falls, KTVB Channel 7 NBC Boise, KIVI, Channel 6 ABC Boise and KBOI Channel 2 CBS also of Boise.

== Independence Day ==
Every year, the town of Hailey, Idaho celebrates Independence Day as Days of the Old West. The celebration consists of four major events. Main Street is cleared and the sidewalks fill with spectators. At noon, a mock old west shoot out takes place in the centre of town. The next event is a parade. After the parade, spectators gather at Hop Porter Park for food and music. Activities also include a rodeo and fireworks.

== Notable people ==
- Bowe Bergdahl, United States Army held captive by the Taliban in Afghanistan
- Tara Buck, actress
- Shane Carden, football player
- Dorothy Custer, TV host, harmonicist
- Laverne Fator, U.S. Racing Hall of Fame jockey
- Simon J. Friedman, businessman and Jewish community leader
- Simon M. Friedman, businessman and politician
- Chase Josey, snowboarder
- Pamela Sue Martin, actress
- Debbie McDonald, dressage Olympian
- Bob Mizer, photographer
- Ezra Pound, poet, was born in Hailey and lived there the first 18 months of his life
- E. Parry Thomas, banker
- Leopold Werthheimer, businessman and philanthropist
- Mats Wilander, tennis player
- Bruce Willis and his then-wife Demi Moore moved to Hailey in 1988.
- Rumer Willis, actress, Dancing with the Stars winner
- Hilary Knight, olympian, PWHL player, move to Hailey later
