= Trail Creek =

Trail Creek may refer to

- Trail Creek, Indiana, a town in northern Indiana
- Trail Creek (Lake Michigan), a creek in northern Indiana which discharges into Lake Michigan
- Trail Creek (Rogue River tributary), a stream in Oregon
- Trail Creek, Alaska
- Trail Creek Course, a golf course in Sun Valley, Idaho
