= Across the River and into the Trees (film) =

2022 film by Peter Flannery

- Theatrical release poster
- Directed by: Paula Ortiz
- Screenplay by: Peter Flannery
- Based on: Across the River and into the Trees by Ernest Hemingway
- Produced by: John Smallcombe; Kirstin Roegner; Liev Schreiber; Ken Gord; Robert MacLean; Michael Paletta
- Starring: Liev Schreiber; Matilda De Angelis; Josh Hutcherson; Laura Morante; Massimo Popolizio; Danny Huston
- Cinematography: Javier Aguirresarobe
- Edited by: Stuart Baird; Kate Baird
- Music by: Edward Shearmur
- Production company: Tribune Pictures
- Distributed by: Level 33 Entertainment; Renaissance Media (Canada); PFA Films; L'Altrofilm (Italy)
- Release dates: 30 March 2022 (Sun Valley Film Festival); 30 August 2024 (Canada); 3 July 2025 (Italy)
- Running time: 107 minutes
- Countries: United Kingdom; Italy; Canada
- Language: English

Across the River and into the Trees is a 2022 war drama film directed by Paula Ortiz and adapted by Peter Flannery from the 1950 novel by Ernest Hemingway. It stars Liev Schreiber, Matilda De Angelis, Josh Hutcherson, Laura Morante, Massimo Popolizio, and Danny Huston. The film premiered at the Sun Valley Film Festival on 30 March 2022.

== Premise ==
United States Army Colonel Richard Cantwell confronts the news of his terminal illness with stoic indifference and enlists a military driver for presumably his final hunting trip and a visit to Venice. Along the way, Cantwell investigates an alleged war crime and has a chance encounter with a young woman from the Italian nobility.

== Cast ==
- Liev Schreiber as Colonel Richard Cantwell
- Matilda De Angelis as Renata Contarini
- Josh Hutcherson as Jackson
- Laura Morante as Contessa Contarini
- Massimo Popolizio as Vanni Rizzon
- Danny Huston as Captain Wes O'Neill
- Sabrina Impacciatore as Agostina

== Production ==
Screenwriter Peter Flannery's plans to adapt Ernest Hemingway's Across the River and into the Trees into a feature film date back to 2016, when Pierce Brosnan, Isabella Rossellini, and María Valverde came on board to star and Martin Campbell was set to direct. In September 2020, Paula Ortiz replaced Campbell as director and every role was recast, with Liev Schreiber, Matilda De Angelis, Laura Morante, Javier Cámara, and Giancarlo Giannini joining the cast. Josh Hutcherson was added to the cast in November, and Danny Huston joined the following year in February.

After delays in securing insurance, principal photography began in late 2020 or early 2021 amid the COVID-19 pandemic in Italy with cinematographer Javier Aguirresarobe. Locations included Venice; Treviso, including the Canale dei Buranelli; and the Friuli-Venezia Giulia region. A nationwide lockdown allowed the cast and crew to film in an empty St Mark's Square. By March 2021, production concluded. Editing was completed by Stuart and Kate Baird.

== Release ==
The film premiered at the Sun Valley Film Festival in the Sun Valley Opera House on 30 March 2022 in Sun Valley, Idaho, a resort town where Hemingway once lived. In 2022, the film picked up the Jury Prize from the Italian Contemporary Film Festival, and Jose Tirado was recognized for his production design at the Ischia Film Festival, where it held its European premiere on 2 July. The film was released in Spain on 11 October 2023. Bleecker Street was originally set to distribute the film after buying the rights in May 2023. In May 2024, Level 33 Entertainment acquired the North American distribution rights from them, scheduling the film for a theatrical run starting 30 August 2024. PFA Films and L'Altrofilm released the film in Italy on 3 July 2025.

=== Critical response ===
On the review aggregator website Rotten Tomatoes, 82% of 17 critics' reviews are positive, with an average rating of 6.5/10. Metacritic, which uses a weighted average, assigned the film a score of 63 out of 100, based on 6 critics, indicating "generally favorable" reviews.
