= Sun Valley Golf Course =

- Location within the United States Location within Idaho
- 43.706°N 114.347°W

Club information
- Location: Sun Valley Road; Sun Valley, Idaho
- Elevation: 6,000 feet (1,830 m)
- Established: 1937, 89 years ago
- Type: Resort / Public
- Owner: Sun Valley Resort
- Operator: Sun Valley Resort
- Tota holes: 45
- Website: www.sunvalley.com/things-to-do/golf/

Trail Creek Course
- Designed by: Robert Trent Jones Jr. (1980 renovation)
- Par: 72
- Length: 6,968 yd (6,372 m)
- Course rating: 72.9
- Slope rating: 138

White Clouds Course
- Designed by: Robert Trent Jones Jr.
- Par: 36 (9 holes)
- Length: 3,605 yd (3,296 m)
- Course rating: 37.5 (75.0 for 18 holes)
- Slope rating: 145

Elkhorn Golf Club
- Designed by: Robert Trent Jones Sr. & Robert Trent Jones Jr.
- Par: 72
- Length: 7,214 yd (6,596 m)
- Course rating: 72.7
- Slope rating: 139
- Course record: 61 – Doyle Corbett (1998)

Sun Valley Golf Course is a resort golf complex in the Rocky Mountains of the western United States, located in Sun Valley, Idaho. It consists of three courses totaling 45 holes: Trail Creek, White Clouds, and Elkhorn Golf Club.

== Courses ==
=== Trail Creek ===
The resort's primary 18-hole championship course, now known as Trail Creek, straddles that tributary of the Big Wood River, which flows southwest toward the resort and city of Ketchum. Opened 89 years ago as a nine hole course in the resort's first summer of 1937, it was traditionally known as "Sun Valley Golf Course," and expanded to 18 holes in the early 1960s.

After Earl Holding purchased Sun Valley in 1977, the golf course underwent a redesign by Robert Trent Jones Jr. and reopened in 1980. The par-72 course plays at 6,968 yd (6,372 m) from the back tees, with a course rating of 72.9 with a slope rating of 138. The approximate average elevation is 6,000 feet (1,830 m) above sea level. At its base is the Sun Valley Club, the sizable golf clubhouse for the resort, with a 25-acre (10 ha) practice facility and an 18-hole putting course.

The Ernest Hemingway memorial is west of Trail Creek's eighth tee.

=== White Clouds ===
The White Clouds Course opened in 2008, on the former land of the Sun Valley Gun Club. The newest of the courses, the nine-hole layout has impressive views and severe elevation changes over its 3,605 yards (3,296 m) and is the most difficult, with a course rating of 37.5 (75.0 for 18 holes) and a slope of 145. Also designed by Jones, it is named after the White Cloud Mountains in adjacent Custer County.

=== Elkhorn Golf Club ===
Elkhorn Golf Club is south of the other two courses, southeast of Dollar Mountain, and opened for play in 1975. It varied between being a semi-private and private club, then was acquired by the resort in 2011. Elkhorn is a split-design of Robert Trent Jones Senior and Junior; the father contributed the hillier front nine and the son the back, which is laden with water hazards. Also par 72, the tips measure 7,214 yd (6,596 m) with a rating of 72.7 and slope of 139.

== Killebrew-Thompson Memorial ==
Sun Valley hosts the Killebrew-Thompson Memorial (KTM) golf tournament each August to help fund cancer research. Launched 49 years ago in 1977 by baseball hall of famer Harmon Killebrew of Payette and former congressman Ralph Harding, it originally honored Danny Thompson, a teammate of Killebrew's with the Minnesota Twins who continued his major league career after being diagnosed with leukemia, and died at age 29. Notable participants that first year were President Gerald Ford, House Speaker Tip O'Neill, and hall of fame slugger Mickey Mantle. Following Killebrew's death from esophageal cancer in 2011, his name was attached to the event.
