= Grand America Hotel =

Hotel in Salt Lake City, Utah, U.S.

The Grand America Hotel

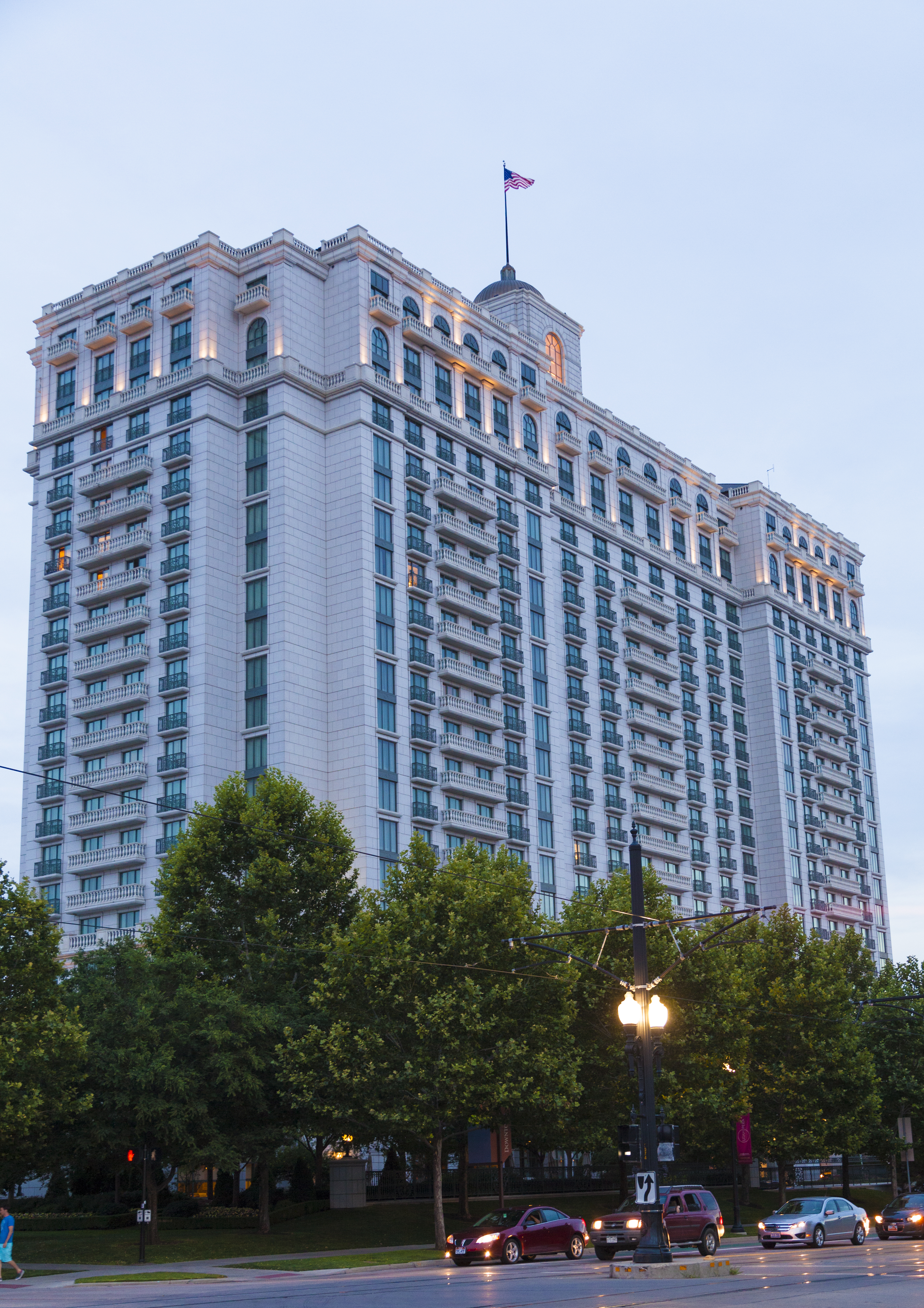
- The Grand America Hotel, July 2013
- Interactive map of the The Grand America Hotel area

General information
- Location: 555 South Main Street; Salt Lake City, Utah, United States
- Coordinates: 40°45′27″N 111°53′25″W
- Opened: 2001
- Owner: Grand America Hotels & Resorts

Height
- Height: 328 feet (100 m)

Technical details
- Floor count: 24

Design and construction
- Architect: Frank Nicholson
- Known for: Flagship facility of the Grand America Hotels & Resorts

Other information
- Number of rooms: 775
- Parking: Paid self & valet

Website
- www.grandamerica.com

The Grand America Hotel is the largest hotel in Salt Lake City, Utah, United States. Located at 555 South Main Street, Salt Lake City, 84111, it is one block away from Washington Square in the downtown area. It was commissioned and built in 2001 by Earl Holding, and designed by Frank Nicholson. The architect was Smallwood Reynolds Stewart and Stewart. Frank Nicholson was the Interior Designer. The hotel's façade is covered in 300,000 square feet of Vermont white granite. The interior has English all-wool carpets and Milanese and Venetian chandeliers. It was Salt Lake City's only Five Diamond hotel, as ranked by American Automobile Association in 2012.

It is the eighth-tallest building in Salt Lake City, and the tallest hotel with 24 floors. The hotel is 328 feet (100 m) tall if measured all the way to the top of the flag pole. The hotel also features 775 rooms and suites, numerous conference rooms which total in 75,000 square feet (7,000 m^{2}) of flexible meeting space, a Conde Nast Traveler-rated full-service spa, outdoor and indoor pools, exercise facilities, Garden Cafe restaurant, Lobby Lounge and Gibson Lounge bar.

The building has been home to conferences, lectures and is also frequently used by visiting professional sports teams. For example, in October 2013, Condoleezza Rice gave a speech at the hotel. In 2024, Ukraine President Volodymyr Zelenskyy spoke at a meeting of the National Governors Association.

== See also ==
- List of hotels in the United States
- Grand America Hotels & Resorts

== External references ==
- Official website
