= Dollar Mountain =

Ski hill in Idaho, United States

- Interactive map of Dollar Mountain
- Location: Sun Valley; Blaine County, Idaho, U.S.
- Nearest city: Ketchum
- Coordinates: 43°40′59″N 114°20′49″W
- Vertical: 628 ft (191 m)
- Top elevation: 6,638 ft (2,023 m)
- Base elevation: 6,010 ft (1,832 m)
- Lift system: 4 chairlifts: 2 quads; 1 triple; 1 double
- Terrain parks: 1
- Snowfall: 200 in (17 ft; 508 cm)
- Snowmaking: yes
- Night skiing: no
- Website: Sun Valley.com

Dollar Mountain (6638 ft., 2023 m) is a ski hill in the western United States in south central Idaho, part of the Sun Valley ski resort. The treeless Dollar caters primarily to beginner and lower intermediate skiers; the primary mountain for advanced skiers is Bald Mountain, or "Baldy", next to the city of Ketchum.

Dollar Mountain is served by four chairlifts, named Dollar, Half Dollar, Quarter Dollar, and Elkhorn. Dollar and Quarter Dollar are detachable quads, Half Dollar is a double, and the Elkhorn lift is a triple, separated from the other three. The base of the Elkhorn lift is at Elkhorn Village to the south, but it is possible to ski between the Dollar and Elkhorn sides. A magic carpet is also available for first-time skiers. The Half Dollar chairlift serves a terrain park for snowboarders and skiers. Dollar Mountain consists of trails that are gentler in pitch and shorter than those on Baldy.

The base elevation of Dollar Mountain is 6,010 ft (1,832 m) above sea level, and its vertical drop is 628 ft (191 m), less than one-fifth of Baldy's 3,400 ft (1,036 m). A new day lodge at the base of Dollar was built and completed in the fall of 2004 and is comparable in spaciousness and style (massive timber, river rock, & glass) to the day lodges at Bald Mountain. It was named for Carol Holding, wife of resort owner Earl Holding.

New permanent snowmaking was installed in the fall of 2006 on some of the ski runs on Dollar, ensuring better snow coverage during periods of low snowfall. The old Dollar and Quarter Dollar fixed-grip double lifts were replaced in the summer of 2007 with Doppelmayr CTEC Uni-G model high-speed detachable quads.
