= Grand America Hotels & Resorts =

Hotel and resort chain the United States

- Formerly: Little America
- Type: Private
- Industry: Hotels; Resorts
- Founder: Earl Holding
- Headquarters: Cheyenne, Wyoming, United States
- Number of locations: 8 properties (2018)
- Area served: Western United States
- Owner: Earl Holding Family
- Website: grandamericahotelsandresorts.com

Grand America Hotels & Resorts (formerly known as Little America) is a chain of eight hotels and resorts in the Western United States.

== History ==
The first Little America, called Little America Wyoming, is 24 miles (39 km) west of Green River, and 35 miles (56 km) west of Rock Springs on Interstate 80. Built in 1952 along the old alignment of U.S. Route 30 which was also the Lincoln Highway, the first road across America, the property began with two fuel pumps, a 24-seat café, and 12 guest rooms. Today the location has 140 rooms and expanded gas pumps for both truck drivers and travelers. For a number of years, this location had the world's largest filling station based on the number of pumps in operation – 55 in all.

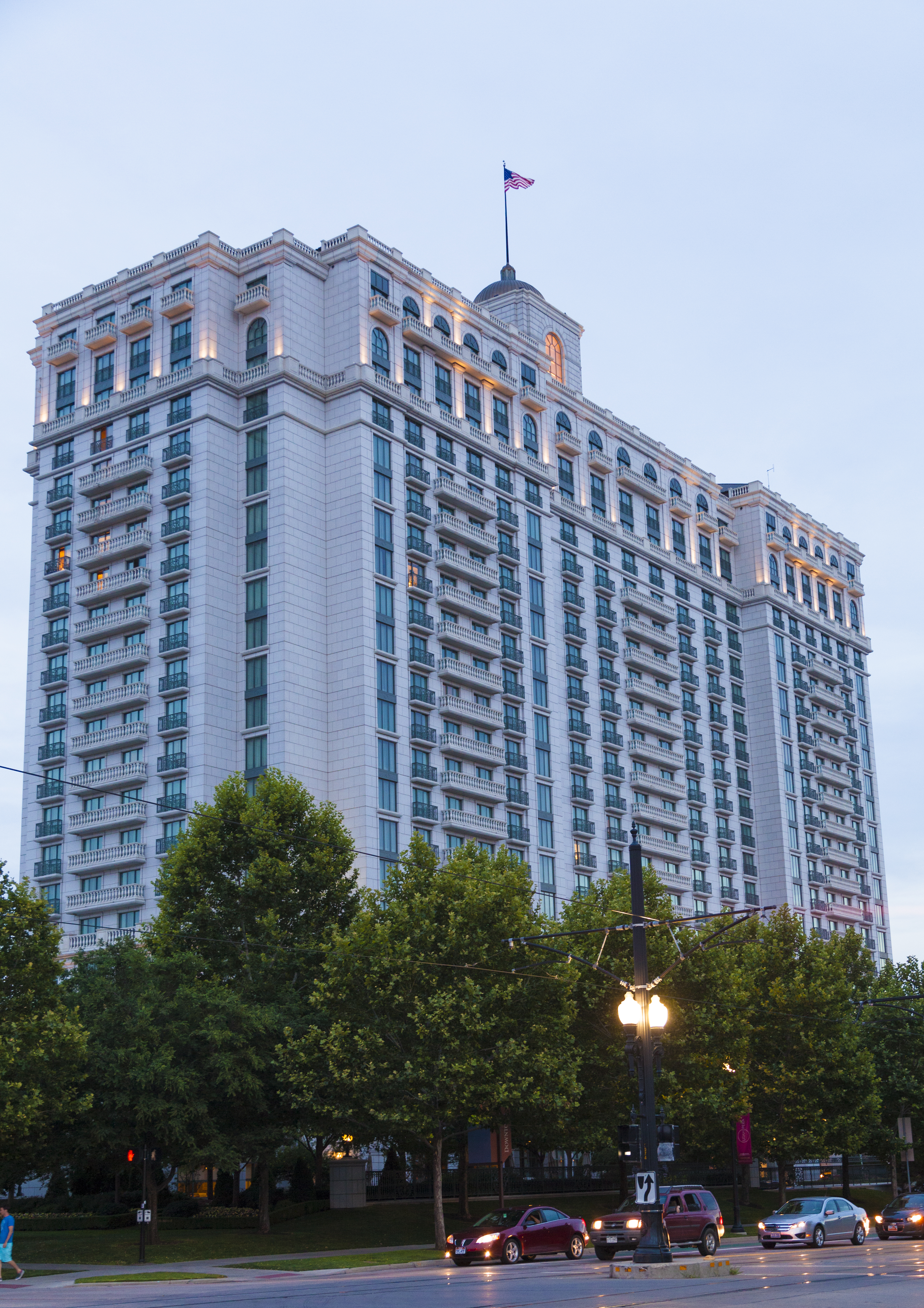
The Grand America Hotel in Salt Lake City, July 2013

A penguin was used for many years as their logo, and penguins can still be seen on the roofs at Little America Wyoming. The penguin was used on most of the numerous billboards advertising the Little America hotel. These billboards were located along Interstate 80. In partial reference to the famously remote Little America station in Antarctica, they reminded travelers in vehicles at regular intervals how close they were to the Little America hotel and that there was nothing else available for many miles in either direction. The last of the penguin billboards was removed in the early 2000s.

In September 2014, Grand America Hotels & Resorts entered into a non-prosecution agreement with Homeland Security Investigations (HSI), the U.S. Immigration and Customs Enforcement (ICE), and the United States Attorney for the District of Utah to forfeit $1.95 million (equivalent to $2.65 million in 2025) in relation to an investigative case involving the hiring of illegal aliens and undocumented workers. During an administrative audit in 2010-11, HSI had discovered that 133 "undocumented individuals" had been working for the company at The Grand America Hotel in Salt Lake City, Utah. Following the completion of the audit, the company was given a warning and the employees were terminated. However, according to the press release by the United States Attorney for the District of Utah, as many as 43 of the workers returned to the former jobs, some "within days of the HSI warning". Their return to work was facilitated by three temporary employment agencies, which had been created expressly to allow the former employees to continue working. Notwithstanding, the press release continued, the three temporary employment agencies had been created by "lower level and mid-level managers" and "without the knowledge or consent of top executives at the Hotel". Moreover, most of workers returned using fraudulent documents and different names. In addition to the forfeiture, the company agreed to adopt new measures to insure future compliance with employment laws. These measures were anticipated to cost the company $500,000 (equivalent to $680,000 in 2025) to implement. The U.S. Attorney's Office indicated that Grand America Hotels & Resorts had been fully cooperative throughout the entire process. In the end, two managers were disciplined and four more were fired.

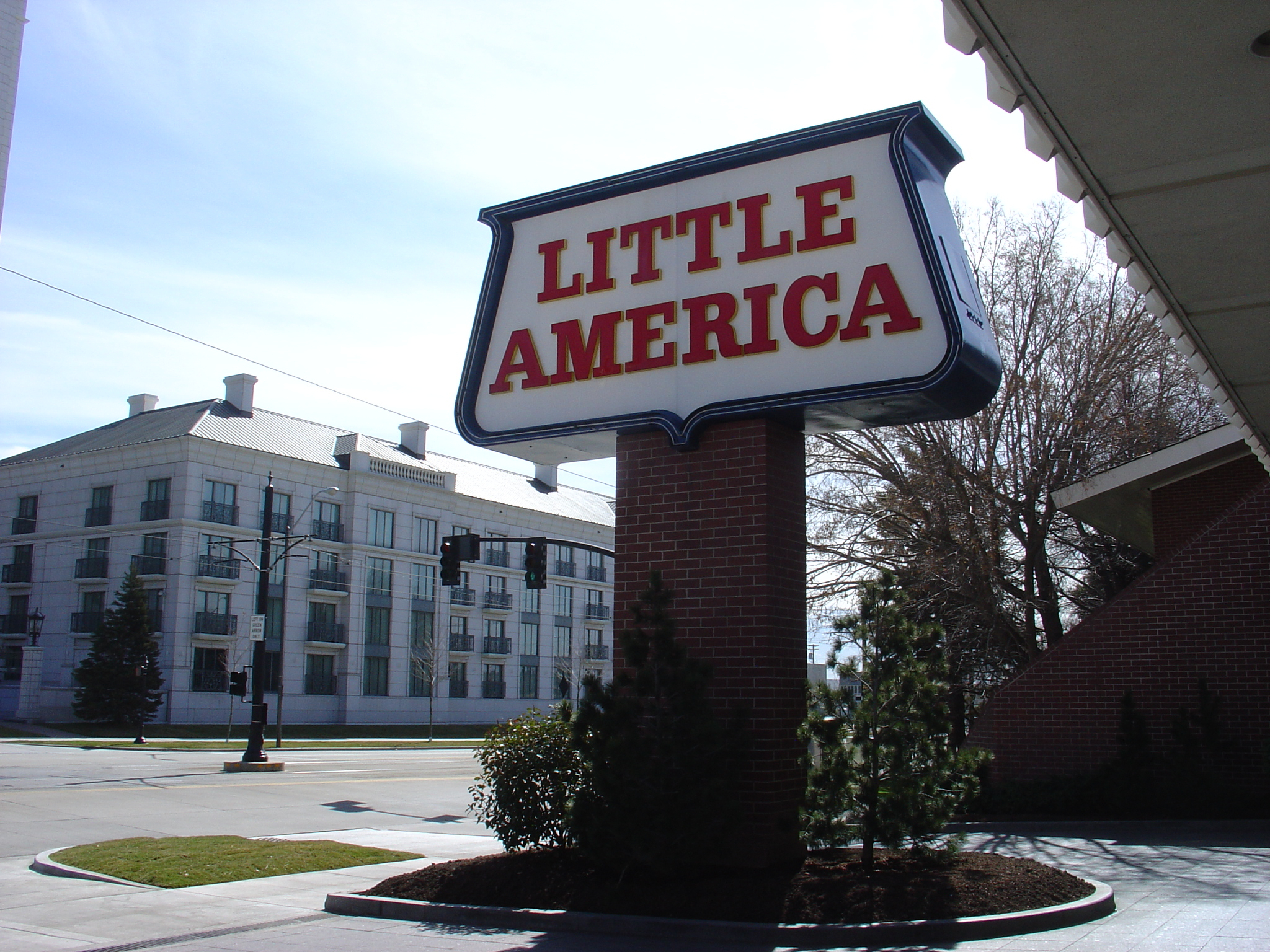
A sign for the Little America Hotel in Salt Lake City, with part of The Grand America Hotel in the background, March 2007

== Properties ==
In addition to the Little America Wyoming and The Grand America Hotel, other properties include:

- The Little America Hotel & Resort in Cheyenne, Wyoming.
- The Little America Hotel in Salt Lake City (adjacent to The Grand America Hotel).
- The Little America Hotel in Flagstaff, Arizona.
- The Sun Valley Resort in Sun Valley, Idaho.
- Snowbasin Resort in Weber County, Utah (near Huntsville).
- The Westgate Hotel in San Diego, California.

The properties are owned by Robert Earl Holding's family, which also owned the Sinclair Oil Corporation from 1976 to 2022. Holding, who began by operating the original motel in the 1950s, died on April 19, 2013, with a personal net worth of more than $3 billion (equivalent to $4.15 billion in 2025).

== Gallery ==
Little America Motel, Little America, Wyoming

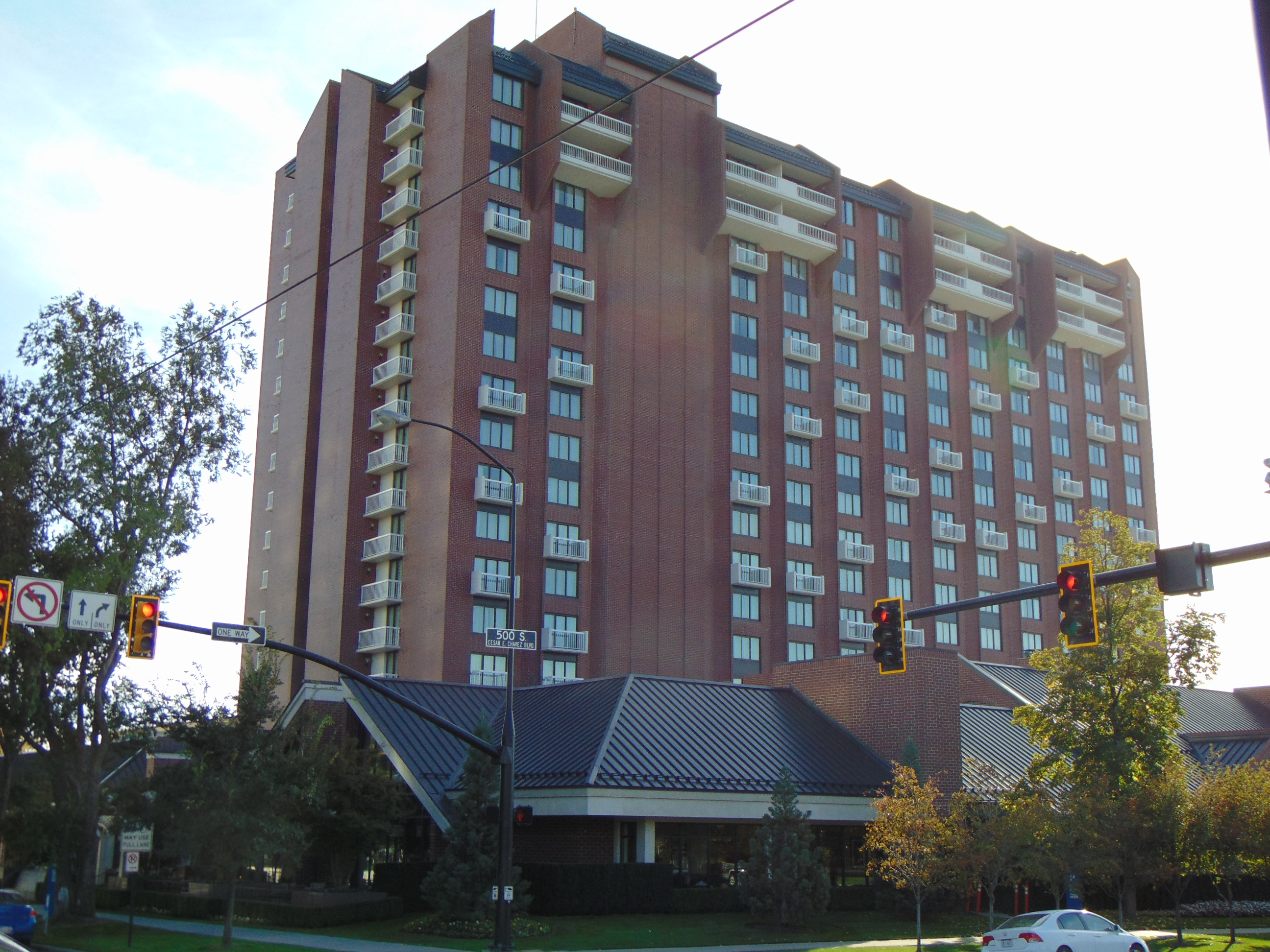
Little America Hotel, Salt Lake City

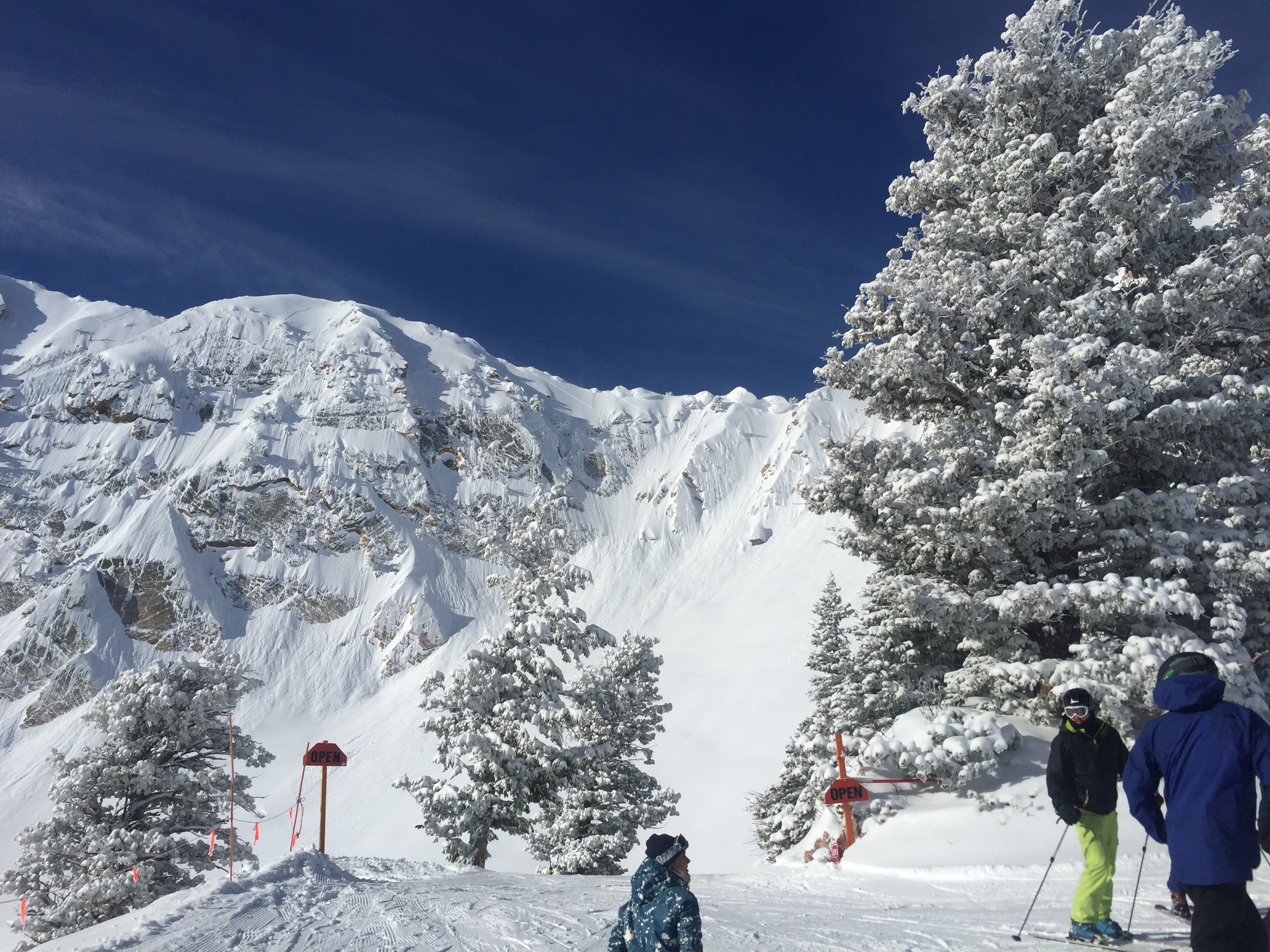
Skiers at the Snow Basin Resort.

== See also ==
- List of hotels in the United States
- List of ski areas and resorts in the United States
