= The Ski Tour =

The Ski Tour is a professional alpine skiing and a half-pipe freeskiing league founded in 2007 and sanctioned by the U.S. Ski and Snowboard Association. In addition to the sporting events, The Ski Tour also features an entertainment package — The Base Camp Music Experience — that includes concerts, parties, and other non-athletic events at each of the tour's venues. The Ski Tour is headquartered in Sun Valley, Idaho, and is sponsored by Honda, Red Bull, Crocs, Spyder, and others.

Four events were televised by ABC in 2007. On November 28, 2007, it was announced that the tour would be merged with the 15-year-old King of The Mountain Series.

== Tour dates ==
Date	City	Country	Venue
2007	Sun Valley	United States	
2007	Breckenridge	United States	
2007	Aspen	United States	
2007	Squaw Valley	United States	Squaw Valley Ski Resort
December 14, 2007	Telluride	United States	Telluride Ski Resort
December 15, 2007	Telluride	United States	Telluride Ski Resort
December 16, 2007	Telluride	United States	Telluride Ski Resort
February 8, 2008	Squaw Valley	United States	Squaw Valley Resort
February 9, 2008	Squaw Valley	United States	Squaw Valley Resort
February 10, 2008	Squaw Valley	United States	Squaw Valley Resort
March 14, 2008	Ketchum	United States	Sun Valley Resort
March 15, 2008	Ketchum	United States	Sun Valley Resort
March 16, 2008	Ketchum	United States	Sun Valley Resort
