= Sinclair Oil Corporation =

American petroleum company (1916–2022)

- Type: Public until 1969; Subsidiary, 1969–1976; Private, 1976–2022
- Industry: Oil and gasoline
- Founded: May 1, 1916; 110 years ago
- Founder: Harry F. Sinclair
- Defunct: March 15, 2022; 4 years ago
- Fate: Mostly acquired by HollyFrontier
- Successor: HF Sinclair Corporation
- Headquarters: Salt Lake City, Utah, United States
- Key people: Robert E. Holding, former CEO and Owner; Carol Holding (CEO)
- Owner: Holding family
- Number of employees: 1,200 (2019)
- Website: sinclairoil.com

Sinclair Oil Corporation is an American petroleum corporation founded by Harry F. Sinclair on May 1, 1916. It is presently a subsidiary of HF Sinclair. The Sinclair Oil and Refining Corporation amalgamated the assets of 11 small petroleum companies. Originally a New York corporation, Sinclair Oil reincorporated in Wyoming in 1976. The corporate logo featured the silhouette of a large green Brontosaurus dinosaur. Sinclair adopted the dinosaur as its mascot in 1930, using it as a symbol to emphasise the vast age of petroleum. Although this led to a widespread public misconception that oil came from dinosaurs, Sinclair's own literature stated that their lubricants were derived from Pennsylvania grade crudes that were "mellowing in the ground during the Mesozoic era when dinosaurs populated the earth", not that the oil itself came from dinosaur remains.

From 2013 through 2021, Sinclair was ranked as one of the largest privately owned American corporations. It owned and operated refineries, gas stations, hotels, a ski resort, and a cattle ranch.

== History ==
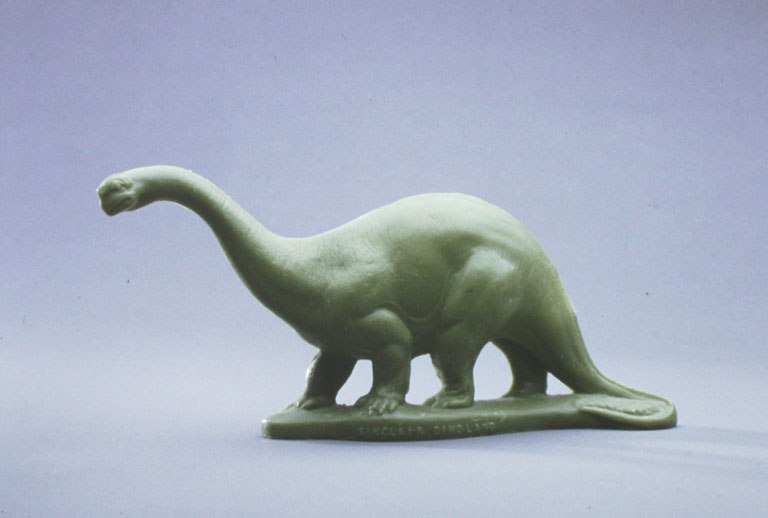
Sinclair Dinoland plastic Brontosaurus, 1964, in the collection of The Children's Museum of Indianapolis

Sinclair has long been a fixture on American roads with its dinosaur logo and mascot, a Brontosaurus.

At the Chicago World's Fair of 1933–1934, Sinclair sponsored a dinosaur exhibit meant to play on the link between the formation of petroleum deposits and the time of dinosaurs, now a largely discredited misconception. The exhibit included a 2-ton animated model of a Brontosaurus. The exhibit proved so popular it inspired a promotional line of rubber brontosaurs at Sinclair stations, complete with wiggling heads and tails, and the eventual inclusion of the brontosaur logo. Later, inflatable dinosaurs were given as promotional items. An anthropomorphic version appeared as a service-station attendant in advertisements. Some locations have a life-size model of the mascot straddling the building's entrance.

=== 1916-1960s ===
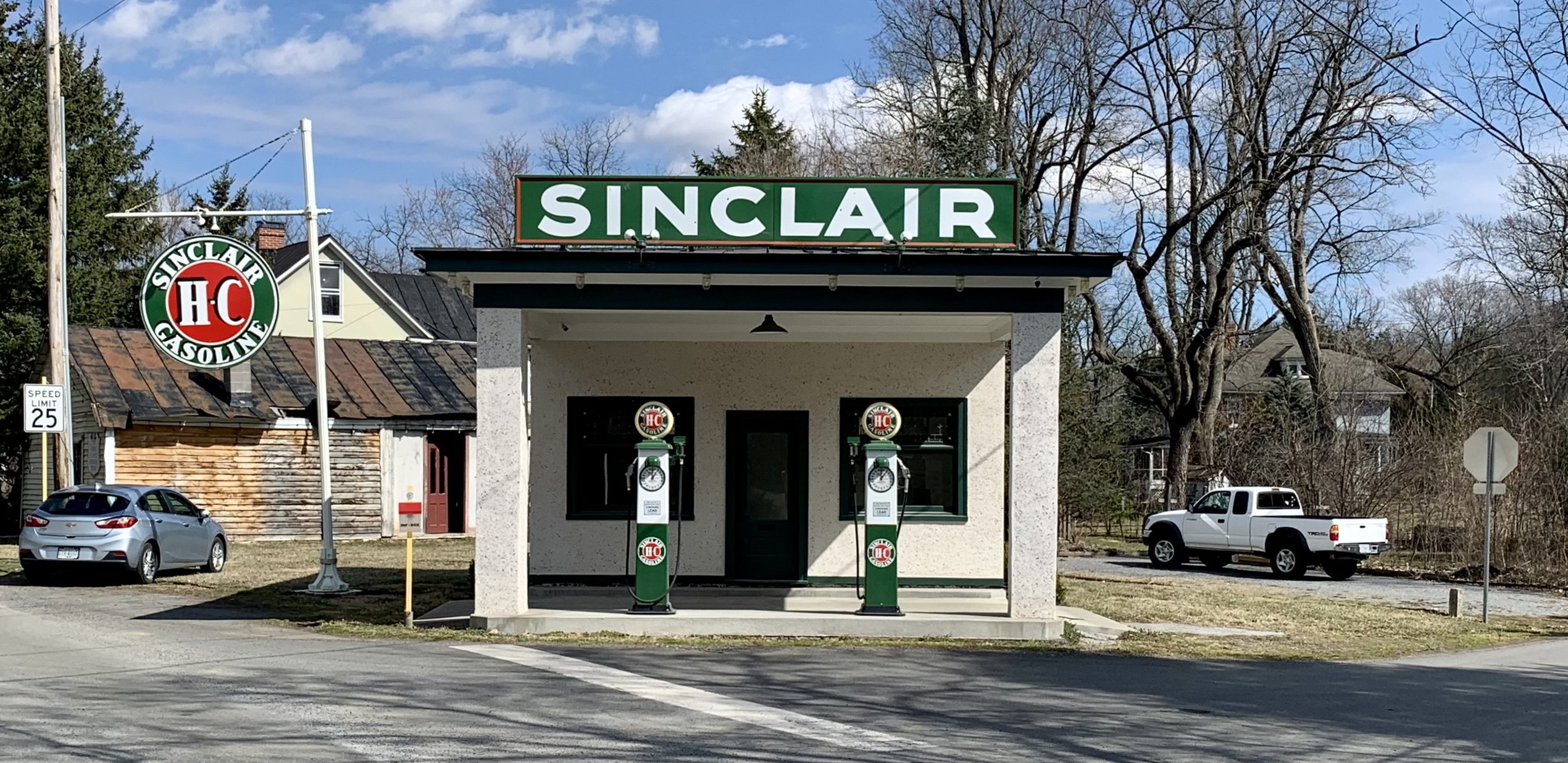
A restored Sinclair station in the White Post Historic District, Virginia

During September 1919, Harry Sinclair restructured Sinclair Oil and Refining Corporation, Sinclair Gulf Corporation, and 26 other related entities into Sinclair Consolidated Oil Corporation. In 1921 Sinclair sold a 50% interest in its pipeline subsidiary to Standard Oil Company of Indiana. In 1932, Sinclair Consolidated Oil Corporation was renamed Consolidated Oil Corporation, becoming Sinclair Oil Corporation in 1943.

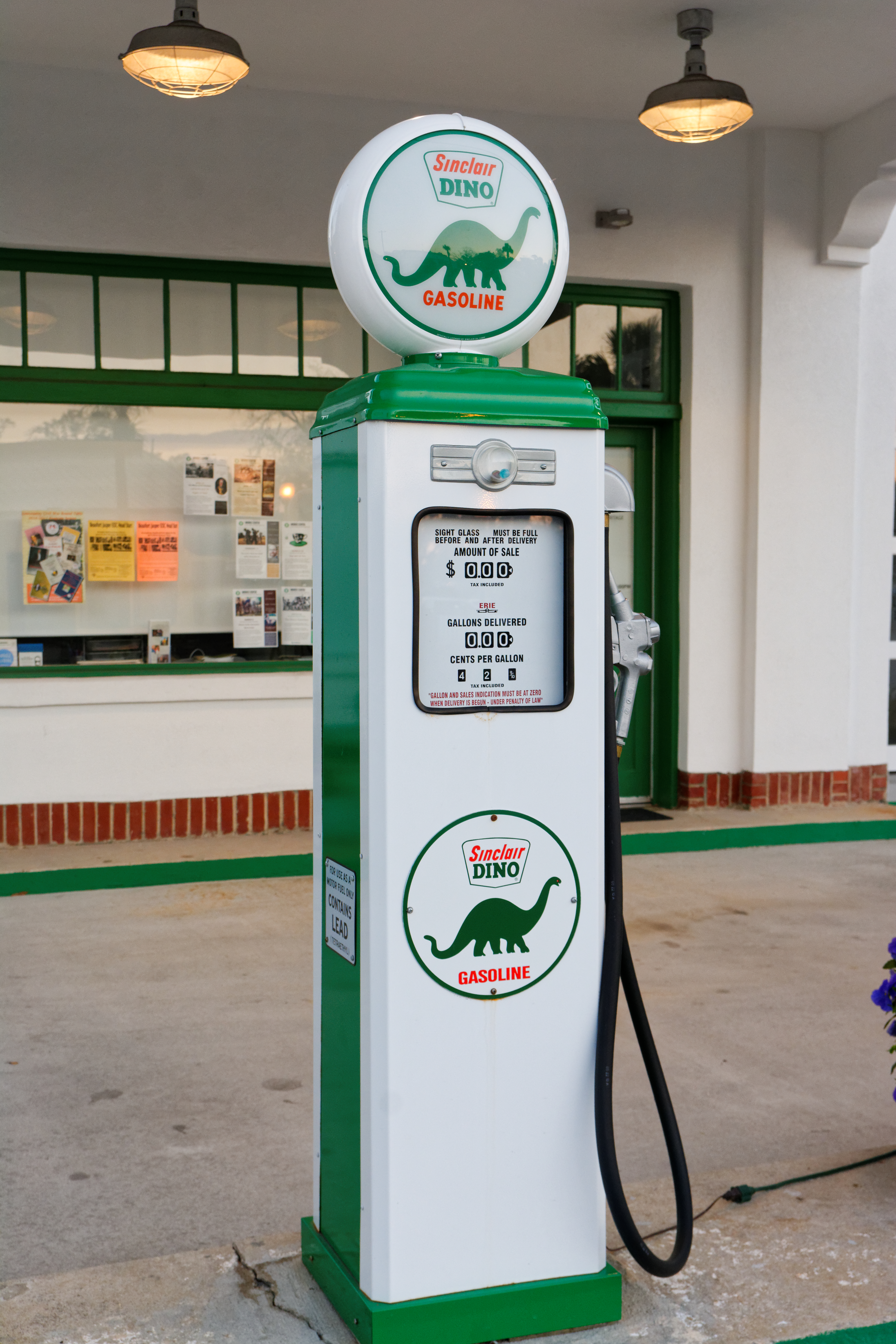
A restored Sinclair gas pump from the 1930s

Near the beginning of the Great Depression, Sinclair sold the remaining interest in its pipeline to Standard Oil of Indiana for US$72.5 million. With these funds, including an additional US$33.5 million from an additional common stock issue, Sinclair retired several promissory notes and prepared to weather the Depression with the remaining supply of cash.

In 1921, Sinclair began negotiating with the Far Eastern Republic in order to secure oil concessions in northern Sakhalin. These efforts would fail due to the Japanese occupation of the entire island, which would end in 1925 with the Soviet Union granting the rights to Japan's North Sakhalin Oil Company instead.

==== Scandals in the Twenties ====
Between 1921 and 1922, Sinclair leased oil production rights to Teapot Dome in Wyoming without competitive bidding. This led to the Teapot Dome scandal.

At the same time, Sinclair Oil was approached by the Italian fascist government. Benito Mussolini's government wanted to increase competition in the Italian oil market, which was controlled by the Italo-American Petroleum Society (SIAP), which in turn was fully dominated by Standard Oil. As the Teapot Dome scandal unfolded in the United States and reached the international press, Mussolini accelerated the negotiations, with a deal signed on May 4, 1924 (although without an official meeting, to avoid public outcry).

Because of this, Sinclair Oil Company is known for having made "large payments to leading Fascists — all acting as intermediaries for Benito Mussolini — in return for an exclusive monopoly to drill for oil on Italian soil and in the Italian colonies".

The deal was reported in a press release by the Head of Government (Mussolini) issued on the night of May 15, 1924, and published by most newspapers on the following day. The press release assured the public that Sinclair Oil had been awarded its contract on a competitive basis and had provided guarantees it had no relations with the international oil trust.

Anti-fascist politician Giacomo Matteotti - who was later kidnapped and killed by Mussolini's newborn secret police - also alluded to this corruption scandal in his article in his posthumous article, published in the July issue of English Life (a magazine founded by Brendan Bracken): Matteotti accused Sinclair Oil of being a pawn of Standard Oil, as well as revealing "grave irregularities concerning the concession."

As the credibility of the Corriere Italiano was collapsing following the involvement of its editor, Filippo Filippelli, in the investigation, on the evening of 12 June 1924 Carlo Bazzi steered his newspaper, Nuovo Paese, towards promoting alternative motives for the murder. He did so at the request of Cesare Rossi, who was seeking to divert the judicial investigation away from himself. This gave rise to the theory of a business-related motive, building on the press campaign that Bazzi had conducted against the Sinclair Oil Corporation throughout the preceding spring, and against Alberto de' Stefani throughout the previous year. In effect, theory of a business-related motive was echoed in the notes of Epifanio Pennetta, who contributed to the preliminary investigation on the murder: "To all appearances," companies like Nafta and Saper "were in competition with the Sinclair company, while in fact they were in cahoots with Sinclair" and added that Sinclair Oil was actually working "in concert" with Standard Oil. By the way, Filippo Naldi, the principal suspect in acting as an intermediary for business interests, was released after spending four months in Regina Coeli prison; when Naldi was released on 14 October 1924, the press observed that Naldi's release had undermined the theory, advanced by some newspapers, of a business-related motive for Matteotti's murder, adding that this line of argument had in fact long since been abandoned because of its manifestly contrived nature.

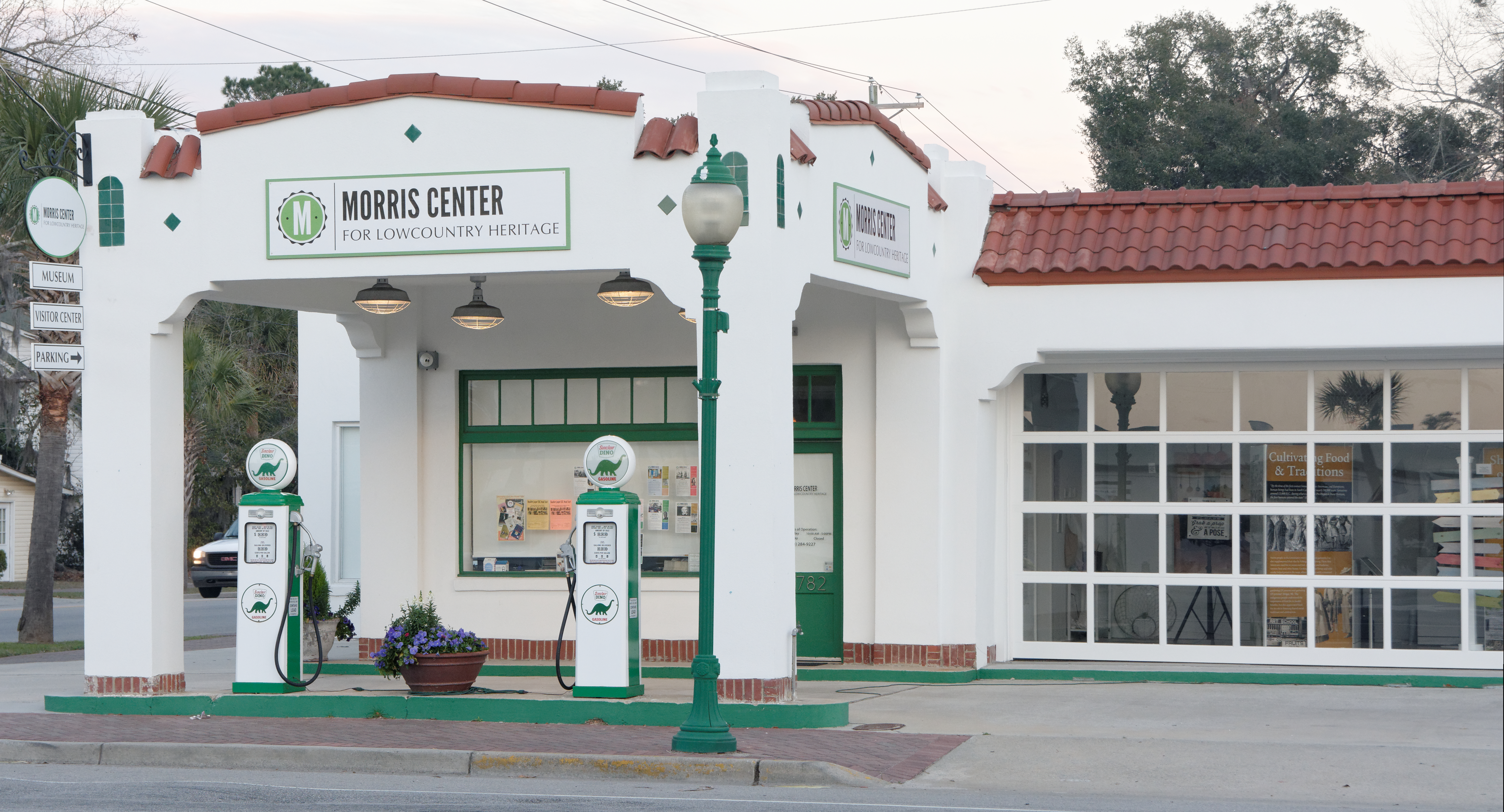
The renovated Sinclair Serving Station in Ridgeland, South Carolina (built 1937), listed in the National Register of Historic Places

==== Expansion in the Thirties ====
During the Great Depression, Sinclair saved many other petroleum companies from receivership or bankruptcy and acquired others to expand its operations. In 1932, Sinclair purchased the assets (Note: Sinclar offered one Sinclair share for each share of Prairie Oil & Gas and 1.4 shares for each share of Prairie Pipe Line Co. The vote of shareholders of the 3 companies on March 1, 1932 was: Sinclar (70% of common and 74% of preferred in favor of merger), Prairie Oil & Gas Co (88.3% in favor) and Prairie Pipe Line Co (3,570,898 of 4,050,000 outstanding shares in favor - 88.17%). Sinclair shareholders ratified the change of name of the company to Consolidated Oil Corporation. Prairie Oil & Gas was renamed Commonwealth Oil & Gas Company, Prairie Pipe Line was renamed Commonwealth Transportation Company. Kansas law required 80% approval for mergers.) of Prairie Oil and Gas' pipeline and producing companies in the southern United States, and the Rio Grande Oil Company in California. The purchase of Prairie also gave Sinclair a 65% interest in Producers and Refiners Corporation (or Parco), which Sinclair subsequently acquired when Parco entered receivership in 1934. Lastly, in 1936, Sinclair purchased the East Coast marketing subsidiary of Richfield Oil Company, which had operated in receivership for several years. Richfield then reorganized, resulting in the creation of the Richfield Oil Corporation. Sinclair was instrumental in transferring capital and managerial assets into Richfield. Thirty years later, Richfield merged with Atlantic Refining, located on the East Coast, forming Atlantic Richfield.

==== After the Second World War ====
In 1955, Sinclair ranked 21st on the Fortune 500; by 1969, it had fallen to 58th. In the early 1960s, Sinclair, along with Henry W. Peters and his son Eric Woods, developed the Turbo-S aircraft oils used for reliability in commercial jets, military jets, guided missiles and space exploration rockets. At the New York World's Fair of 1964–1965, Sinclair again sponsored a dinosaur exhibit, "Dinoland", featuring life-size replicas of nine different dinosaurs, including their signature Brontosaurus. Souvenirs from the exhibit included a brochure ("Sinclair and the Exciting World of Dinosaurs") and featured molded plastic dinosaur figurines. After the Fair closed, Dinoland remained as a traveling exhibit.

Two of the replicas (Tyrannosaurus and Brontosaurus) are still on display at Dinosaur Valley State Park near Glen Rose, Texas. Another, a model of a Trachodon, has been displayed at Brookfield Zoo outside Chicago, Illinois. A replica of a Triceratops is owned by the Kentucky Science Center in Louisville, Kentucky and after a 2022 restoration was mounted above their parking garage. The Ankylosaurus is at the Houston Museum of Natural Science's Sugar Lands location. The Ornithomimus is at the Milwaukee Public Museum. The Stegosaurus is on display in front of the Visitor Center of Dinosaur National Monument in Utah. A copy of the Triceratops is also owned by the Smithsonian Institution and is on display as "Uncle Beazley" in the National Zoological Park in Washington, D.C.

Sinclair Oil & Refining subsidiaries (1917-03-12 and 1919-09-23)
Company	Incorp	Date	Par	Authorized (shares)	Issued	Owned by Sinclair
Sinclair Oil & Refining Corp	New York	Apr 27, 1916	no par	1,000,000	970,074 (Note: 520,000 outstanding on May 1, 1916. Of the remainder 363,637 reserved for conversion of the 10-year bonds and 116,363 unissued. On March 12, 1917 348,666 shares plus 621,408 temporary certificates were outstanding (total 970,074). Outstanding on the first 7 dividend dates were: Aug 10, 1916: 520,000; Nov 15, 1916: 623,598 (Note: Figure does not include any shares resulting from bond conversion); Feb 20, 1917: 966,971; May 19, 1917: 1,000,000; ...; Feb 28, 1918: 1,000,000; 1,447,982.5 shares were outstanding at the time of dissolution in 1919.)	(parent)
Sinclair Oil & Refining Corp	New York	Apr 27, 1916	no par	TBD	1,447,982	(parent)
Sinclair Oil & Gas Co.	Maine	Apr 25, 1916	$100	100,000	100,000	100%
Sinclair Oil & Gas Co.	Maine	Apr 25, 1916	$100	101,000	101,000	100%
Sinclair-Cudahy Pipe Line Co.	Maine	Apr 25, 1916	$100	20,000	(Note: Sinclair Oil & Refining Corp also owned all $1,000,000 of 7% 10-year bonds issued by its pipe line subsidiary; dated May 1, 1916 and retired May 1, 1917.)20,000	100%
Sinclair-Cudahy Pipe Line Co.	Maine	Apr 25, 1916	$100	45,000	45,000	100%
Sinclair Refining Co. (Note: at the time of formation and until January 25, 1917 was named Cudahy Refining Company)	Maine	Oct 19, 1908	$100	80,000	20,000	100%
Sinclair Refining Co.	Maine	Oct 19, 1908	$100	80,000	80,000	100%
Exchange Oil Co.	Maine	Apr 29, 1916	$100	100	100	100%
incorporated after initial formation
Sinclair Coal Co. (Note: Owned 11,000 acres of coal lands in Illinois. The coal was used in the company's own refineries.)	Maine	Apr 4, 1919	$100	4,000	1,770	100%
War Pipe Line Co. (Note: was supposed to run on the Sinclair right-of-way (and use enlarged Sinclair pumping stations) from Drumright to Whiting, from were Standard OIl lines to the Atlantic Seaboard would have been supplied with an extra 10,000-12,000bpd, all financially backed by the government. At the end of September 1918 the first 30 or so miles from Drumright northwards were finished. Eventually only 232 miles were completed from Drumright to Freeman. The pipe line was leased to Sinclair-Cudahy Pipe Line Co and sometime after April 1919 the stock was acquired. The company issued $2,750,000 in 7% notes dated Apr 22, 1919: Series A, due Apr 22, 1920: $250,000; Series B, due Apr 22, 1921: $500,000; Series C, due Apr 22, 1922: $2,000,000)	Maine	July 21, 1918	$100	30,500	500	100%
Sinclair Building Co. (Note: presumably owned the Liberty Tower (Manhattan))	New York	June 6, 1919	$100	30,000	4,228	100%

=== 1969 merger with ARCO ===
In 1969, Sinclair merged with the Atlantic Richfield Company (ARCO) after an attempted acquisition by the Gulf+Western Industries Corporation. Federal antitrust provisions required the new entity to divest itself of certain Sinclair assets. As a result, the East Coast operations of Sinclair were sold to BP. After the ARCO acquisition, many Sinclair stations in the Midwest continued to use the dinosaur logo and opted out of using ARCO's "diamond spark" logo. Some northwest Sinclair stations partially retained the Sinclair brand for a time, using ARCO's blue rectangular logo, including the "spark" graphic, but with the word "Sinclair" substituted for ARCO. The merger also gave ARCO the rights to explore Prudhoe Bay in Northern Alaska.

=== 1976 spin-off ===
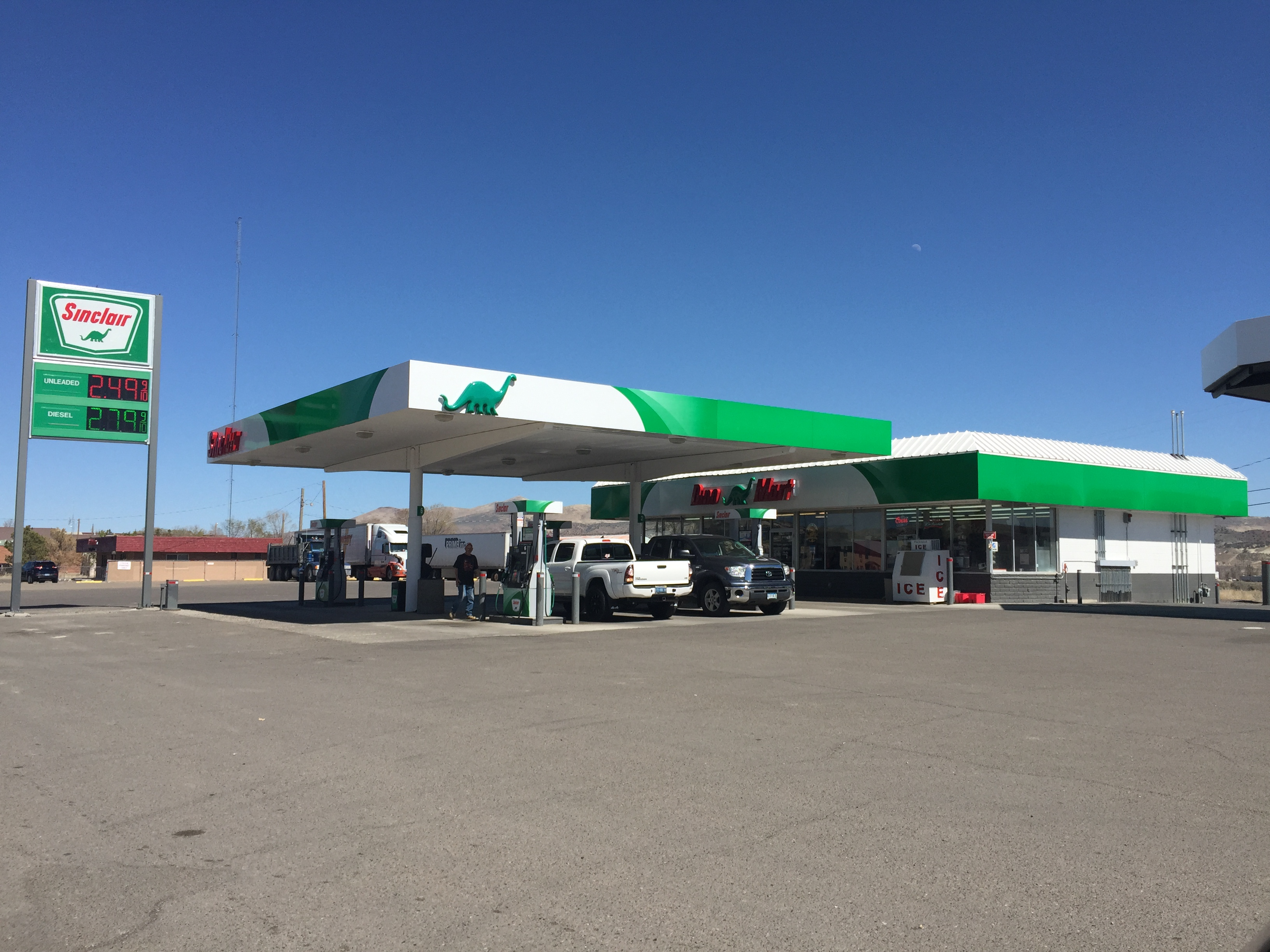
Sinclair service station along Idaho Street (Interstate 80 Business) near College Avenue in Elko, Nevada.

In 1976, ARCO spun off Sinclair by selling certain assets to Robert (Earl) Holding. Assets divested in the spin-off included ARCO's retail operations in the region bounded by the Mississippi River and the Rocky Mountains, and the rights to the Sinclair brand and logo, resulting in many stations along Interstate 80 keeping the dinosaur logo. The ARCO stations in Texas, New Mexico, Illinois, and some portions of Oklahoma were not affected by the divestiture. They continued as part of ARCO until ARCO pulled out of those states in the 1980s.

Headquartered in Salt Lake City, Sinclair was the 94th-largest private company in the United States. There were 2,607 Sinclair filling stations in 20 states in the Western and Midwestern United States. As of 2010, the corporation operated two refineries—one in Casper, Wyoming, and one in Sinclair, Wyoming. Sinclair operated a third refinery in Tulsa, Oklahoma, until it was sold to Holly Corporation on December 1, 2009. Sinclair's other operations included 1,000 miles of pipeline.

In the mid-2010s, Sinclair fuel stations began actively spreading across southern California, including Los Angeles, San Diego, and Fresno, with holders offering attractive deals for potential clients to make the switch from a private brand to the Sinclair name brand.

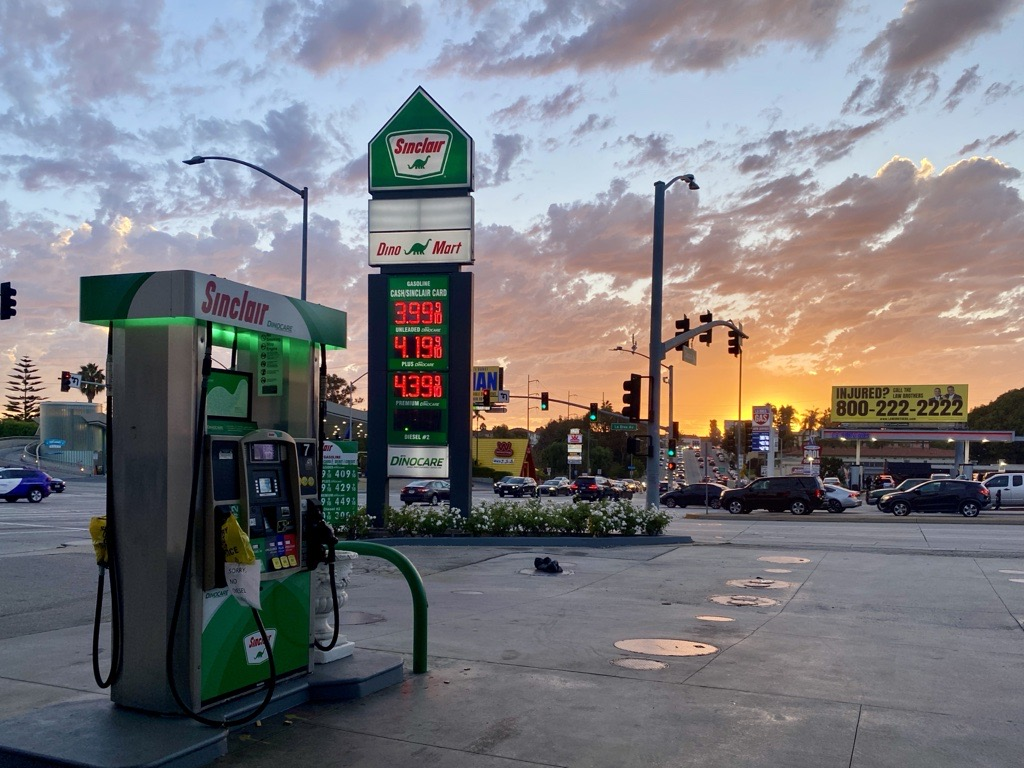
A Sinclair service station at the intersection of La Brea and Slauson Avenues in Los Angeles, California.

By 2018, Sinclair gas stations were widely distributed across the United States, with dozens of gas stations in California, Colorado, Iowa, Idaho, Minnesota, Missouri, Montana, Nebraska, Nevada, Oklahoma, Oregon, South Dakota, Utah, and Wyoming; smaller numbers in Arizona, Connecticut, Kansas, Kentucky, North Dakota, New Mexico, New York, Texas, and Washington; and a single station in Arkansas and Wisconsin.

Sinclair continued to use the green dinosaur, affectionately called "Dino", and marketed all its products under the logo. Sinclair patented the gasoline additive SG-2000. The high-octane fuel blend was called "Dino Supreme" and regular gas was "Dino", trade names used since 1961 when many oil companies still used trade names for their fuels instead of generic terms such as "regular", "premium", or "unleaded". Before that time, Sinclair's trade names for its gasoline products included "Power X" for high-octane fuel and "Sinclair H-C" for regular gas. Sinclair also has marketed products such as Dino, Dino Supreme, and Opaline motor oils.

In August 2021, HollyFrontier announced the acquisition of Sinclair Oil. A new company named HF Sinclair Corporation would be formed in 2022. Under the agreements, Sinclair Oil's branded marketing business and all related commercial activities and its refineries and related operations and assets in Casper and Sinclair, Wyoming, would be combined with HollyFrontier. Sinclair Oil's logistics and storage assets, including approximately 1,200 miles of pipelines, two crude oil terminals and eight light product terminals, would be combined with Holly Energy Partners (HEP). It was expected that the vast majority of Sinclair Oil employees would be invited to continue in their positions following the combination. The transaction did not include exploration and production assets owned by Sinclair Oil & Gas Co.

==== Sinclair Trucking Company ====
Company-owned Sinclair Trucking provided distribution for Sinclair Oil fuels and other related products. Terminals were located in:

- Flagstaff, Arizona
- Denver, Colorado (Henderson, Colorado)
- Des Moines, Iowa
- Kansas City, Kansas
- Minneapolis, Minnesota
- St. Louis, Missouri
- Omaha, Nebraska
- Shawnee, Oklahoma
- Tulsa, Oklahoma
- Salt Lake City, Utah
- Casper, Wyoming
- Sinclair, Wyoming
- Carrollton, Missouri

==== Grand America Hotels & Resorts ====
Sinclair also owned and operated Grand America Hotels & Resorts, which has hotel properties in Salt Lake City, Utah; Flagstaff, Arizona; Cheyenne, Wyoming; Little America, Wyoming; and San Diego, California, in addition to the Sun Valley and Snowbasin ski resorts. These properties were not part of the sale to HollyFrontier, and continue to be owned by the Holding Family.

=== HF Sinclair Corporation ===
In March 2022, the sale to HollyFrontier was completed, and HF Sinclair Corporation traded on the NYSE under the ticker symbol DINO.

== In popular culture ==
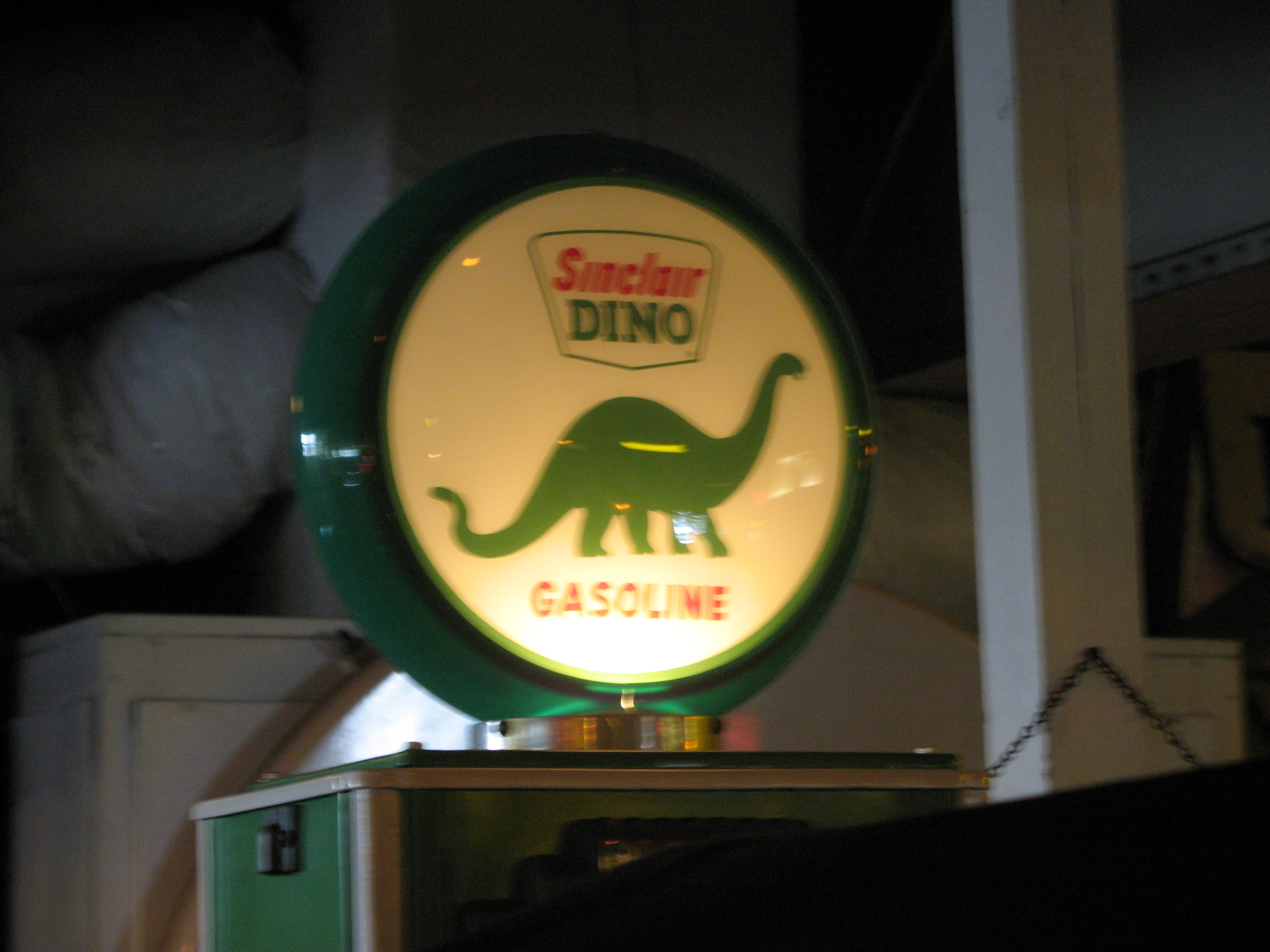
Old Sinclair Dino gas pump

The "Sinclair's Dino" balloon first appeared in the Macy's Thanksgiving Day Parade in 1963, returning to the parade in 2015 after a more than 50-year absence. The balloon is an honorary member of New York's Museum of Natural History as of 1977. It is 36 feet (11 m) tall, 72 feet (22 m) long, and 24 feet (7.3 m) wide.

The Brontosaurus logo is parodied in the Toy Story and Cars franchise films as being the "Dinoco" gas station chain, perhaps an allusion to gasoline and its origin as a fossil fuel, as well as a portmanteau between the "dinosaur" in Sinclair's logo and the suffixes of the "Amoco", "Conoco", and "Sunoco" franchises.

The TV series Dinosaurs featured several characters with names derived from fossil fuel companies. The main character and his family had the surname Sinclair.

Sinclair once had a service station in Montgomery, Alabama, in the Cloverdale neighborhood, that closed in the 1970s. That location was remodeled in 1992 into a restaurant named Sinclair's in honor of the former neighborhood station. The ownership group also opened two other locations, one at Lake Martin and one on the eastside. The lake and Cloverdale locations were closed by 2018, while the eastside location has flourished for nearly 30 years as of 2023.

Joey Jordison, founding drummer of Slipknot, worked at a Sinclair's garage in Urbandale, Iowa, where late at night the band would discuss their plans.

== Distribution ==
During the first 10 months of 1930 Sinclair Refining, the marketing subsidiary of Sinclair Oil, acquired a total of 1,511 bulk distribution plants, service stations and re-sale outlets and the businesses of the 59 associated companies. In addition Sinclair acquired 7 bulk plants and 52 service stations from individuals and acquired long-term leases on 10 bulk plants and 169 service stations.

Companies acquired in 1930
Alabama	2	Petroleum Products Co. (La Fayette), Consumers Oil Co. (Bay Minnett)
Arkansas	5	Home Oil Co. (Ashdown), Royal Oil Co. (L. Rock), Warden Oil Co. (North L. Rock), Burton Oil Co. (Nettleton), Guenters Inc. (l. Rock)
Connecticut	2	Thomaston Land & Impr. Co. (Thomaston), Paramount Oil Co. (New Haven)
Georgia	1	Marion County Oil Co (Buena Vista)
Illinois	2	Kay Oil Co. (Pontiac), Red Eagle Oil Co. (Canton)
Louisiana	1	Liberty Products Co. (Ponchatoula)
Michigan	2	Des Jardins Oil Co. (Marquette), Decker Oil & Gas Co. (Decker)
Mississippi	1	Winston Oil Co. (Noxapater)
New York	5	Seider Oil Co. (Hamburg), Superb Oil Co. (Hayerstraw), Fay C. Adams Oil Co. (Syracuse), Kissan Oil Co. (Watkins Glen), Conine & Cooper (Bath)
North Carolina	4	Piedmont Oil Co. (Gastonia), Imperial Gas & Oil Co. (Winston-Salem), Napoleon Oil Co. (Marion), Cleveland Oil Co. (Shelby)
Ohio	5	Public Service Oil Co. (east-central Ohio), H. R. Johnson Oil Co. (Baltimore), Court Gas & Supply Co. (Marietta), Regal Oil Co. (Piqua), Community Oil Co. (Jackson Center)
Pennsylvania	1	Crader Oil & Supply Co. (Towanda)
South Carolina	4	Swansea Gas & Oil Co. (Swansea), Superior Oil Co. (Batesburg), Calvert Oil Co. (Abbeyville), Citizens Oil Co. (Seneca)
Texas	14	Brazos Oil Co. (Richmond), Sanders Oil Co. (Brenham), Blalock's Tire Store (Huntsville), Gerlach Bros. (Livingston), Dixon Oil Co. (Burton), Home Petroleum Co. (Huntsville), Arnst Bros. (Kingsville), Willis Mercantile Co. (Willis), Home Petroleum Co. (Madisonville), Waller County Oil Co. (Waller), Home Oil Co. (Sweetwater), Doupbitt & McAskill (Edinburg), Eagle Lake Grain Co. (Eagle Lake), Perry Oil Co. (Freeport)
Virginia	7	Fulton Oil Co. (Gate City), Russel Gas Co. (Hanaker), Midland Oil & Gas Co. (Abington), Blue Ridge Oil Co. (The Plains), U.S. Oil Co. (South Hill), Monticello Oil & Gas Co. (Charlottesville), Central Oil Co. (Norton)
W. Virginia	1	Arrowhead Gasoline Co. (Cameron)
Wisconsin	2	Conley Oil Co. (Eau Claire), Eagle Oil Co. (Shawano)

== See also ==
- List of automotive fuel retailers
- Little America Hotel
- Teapot Dome scandal
