= Bald Mountain (Idaho) =

Ski area in Idaho, United States

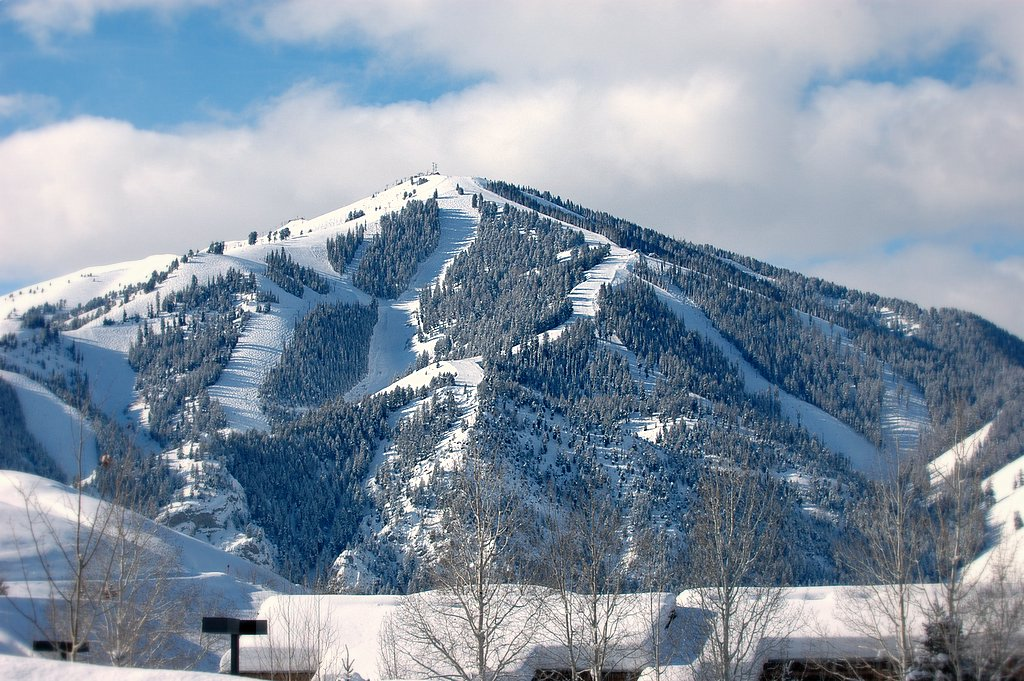
- Bald Mountain from Sun Valley Lake

- Location in the United States Location in Idaho
- Location: Ketchum and Sun Valley; Blaine County, Idaho, U.S.
- Nearest city: Twin Falls - 80 mi (130 km); Boise - 150 mi (240 km); Salt Lake City - 330 mi (530 km)
- Coordinates: 43°39′18″N 114°24′33″W
- Vertical: 3,400 ft (1,036 m)
- Top elevation: 9,150 ft (2,789 m)
- Base elevation: 5,750 ft (1,753 m); River Run
- Skiable area: 2,054 acres (8.3 km^{2})
- Trails: 75: 36% easiest; 42% more difficult; 22% most difficult
- Lift system: 15: 1 gondola (8 person); 2 high speed six packs; 6 high speed quads; 2 triple chairlifts; 1 surface
- Snowfall: 220 in (18 ft; 560 cm)
- Snowmaking: 645 acres (2.6 km^{2})
- Night skiing: none
- Website: Sun Valley.com

Bald Mountain (9,121 feet (2,780 m)) is a mountain in the western United States in south central Idaho, adjacent to the city of Ketchum in Blaine County. The mountain has one of the higher summits of the Smoky Mountains of Idaho, located in the Sawtooth National Forest.

== Sun Valley skiing ==
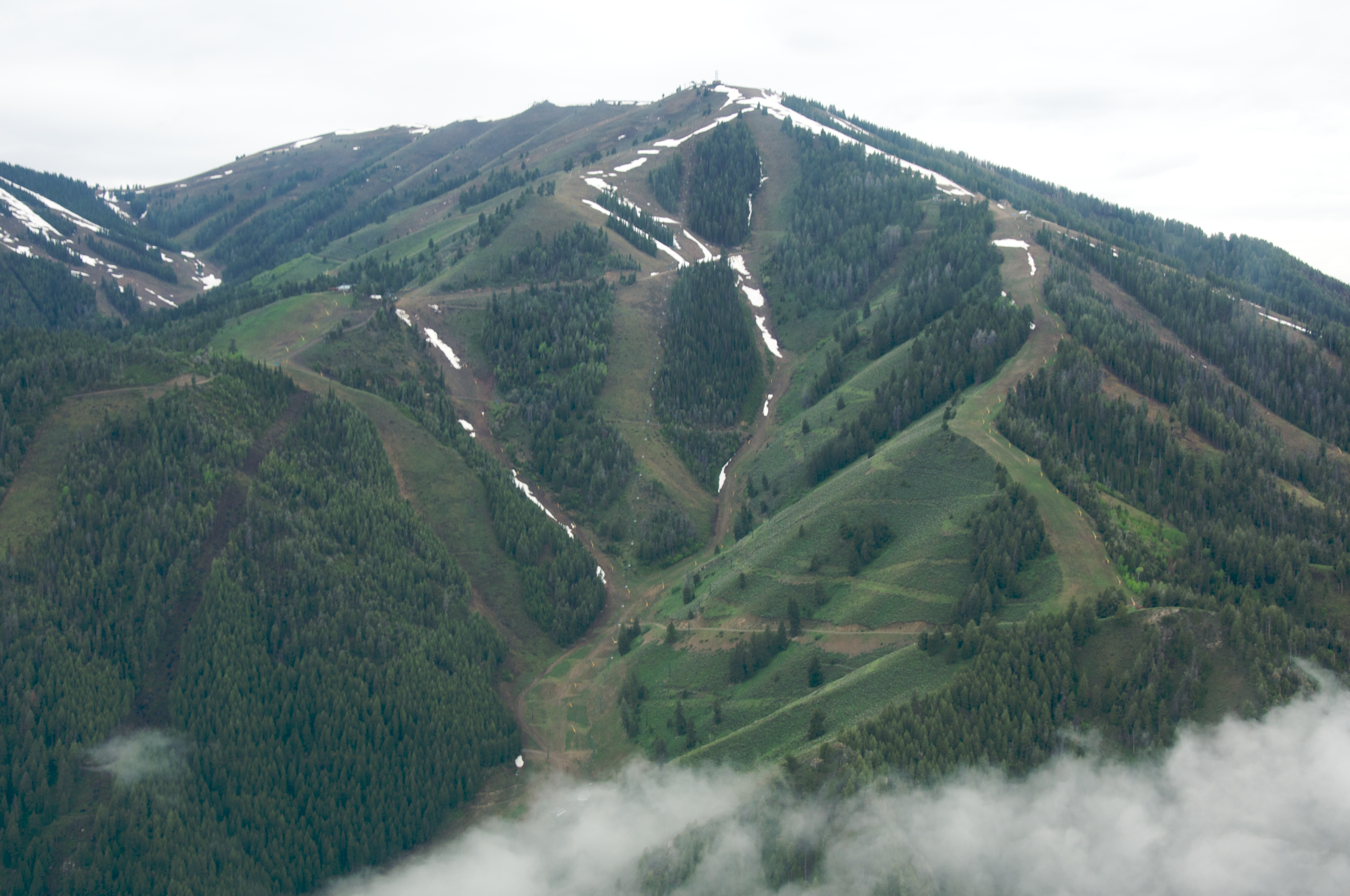
Bald Mountain in summer.

It is the primary ski mountain of the Sun Valley ski resort, and renowned for its lengthy runs at a uniform gradient, at varying levels of difficulty, and with little wind.

In Sun Valley's fourth year of operation (1939–40), Bald Mountain was opened for lift-served skiing, with a series of three (single-seat) chairlifts, unloading at an elevation of 9,020 feet (2,749 m).

With a base elevation of 5,750 feet (1,753 m) along the Big Wood River at River Run, Baldy's vertical drop is 3,400 feet (1,036 m) along its northeast face. It is served by fourteen ski lifts (an eight-person gondola, two high speed six packs, six high speed quads, two triple chairlifts, and a surface); Baldy has more uphill capacity per skier than any other ski area. It has 75 runs with 2,054 acres (8.31 km^{2}) of on-piste skiing, 645 acres (2.61 km^{2}) of which have snowmaking.

The slope ratings are 36% easiest, 42% more difficult, and 22% most difficult. These ratings are relative, not absolute; much of the "easiest" terrain on Bald Mountain would be rated as "intermediate" at most ski areas, as the beginner areas are on the gentler and smaller Dollar Mountain.

== In media ==
In the NBC miniseries, 10.5: Apocalypse, this mountain is an extinct volcano that erupts with devastating force. An avalanche of hot gases and ash cascaded down the mountain and buried everything, including the mountain's ski areas, and the towns of Sun Valley, Ketchum, and Hailey. Multiple rescue teams arrived at the scene and dug through the debris caused by Bald Mountain's eruption, looking for any survivors.
