= Sun Valley, Idaho =

Ski resort in Idaho, United States

Sun Valley Resort

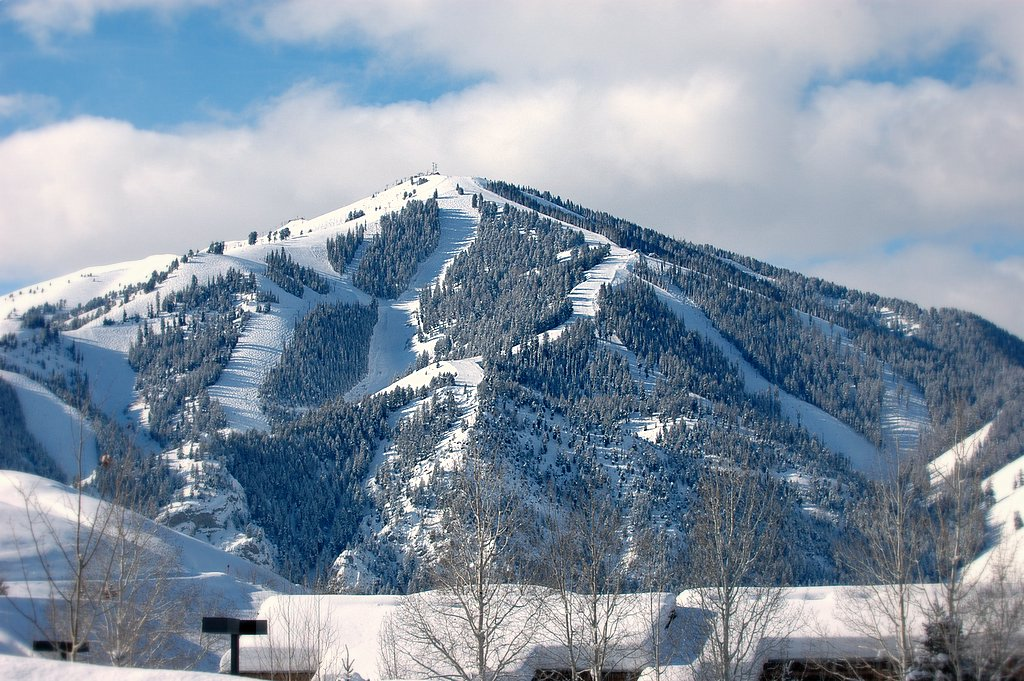
- View of Bald Mountain from Sun Valley Lake in January 2006

- Location within the United States Location within Idaho
- Location: Sun Valley / Ketchum, Idaho, U.S.
- Mountain: Bald Mountain and Dollar Mountain
- Nearest city: Ketchum (adjacent)
- Coordinates: 43.65500°N 114.40917°W
- Status: Operating
- Opened: December 21, 1936
- Owner: Privately owned by the R. Earl Holding family (Grand America Hotels & Resorts)
- Multi-resort pass: Ikon Pass (destination) / Mountain Collective
- Vertical: 3,400 ft (1,036 m)
- Top elevation: 9,150 ft (2,790 m)
- Base elevation: 5,750 ft (1,750 m)
- Skiable area: 2,829 acres (11.4 km^{2})
- Trails: 121 – 36% easiest – 42% more difficult – 20% most difficult – 2% expert only
- Lift system: 17 lifts: 1 gondola, 2 six-packs, 8 quads, 3 triples, 1 double, 2 surface lifts
- Lift capacity: 29,717 per hour
- Snowfall: 164 in (420 cm) (avg. annual)
- Snowmaking: 645 acres (2.6 km^{2}) snowmaking area; 78% of groomable terrain backed by snowmaking
- Website: sunvalleyidaho.gov

Sun Valley is a resort town and alpine ski resort in the western United States, in Blaine County, Idaho, adjacent to the city of Ketchum in the Wood River valley. The population was 1,783 at the 2020 census. The elevation of Sun Valley (at the Lodge) is 5,920 feet (1,805 m) above sea level.

Among skiers, the term "Sun Valley" refers to the alpine ski area, which consists of Bald Mountain, the main ski mountain adjacent to Ketchum. Dollar Mountain, which is adjacent to Sun Valley, is suited for novice and lower intermediate skiers. Bald Mountain, or "Baldy", best suited for intermediate to advanced and expert skiers, has a summit of 9,150 feet (2,790 m) and a vertical drop of 3,400 feet (1,035 m). The treeless "Dollar" at 6,638 feet (2,023 m) has a moderate vertical drop of 628 feet (191 m).

The term "Sun Valley" is used more generally to speak of the region surrounding the city, including the neighboring city of Ketchum and the Wood River Valley area winding south to Hailey and Bellevue. The region has been a seasonal home to the rich and famous since first being brought to public attention by Ernest Hemingway in the late 1930s.

Scheduled passenger airline service is available at Friedman Memorial Airport (SUN) in Hailey, approximately fifteen miles (25 km) south. Visitors are relatively close to the Sawtooth National Recreation Area, accessed over Galena Summit on State Highway 75, the Sawtooth Scenic Byway.

== History ==
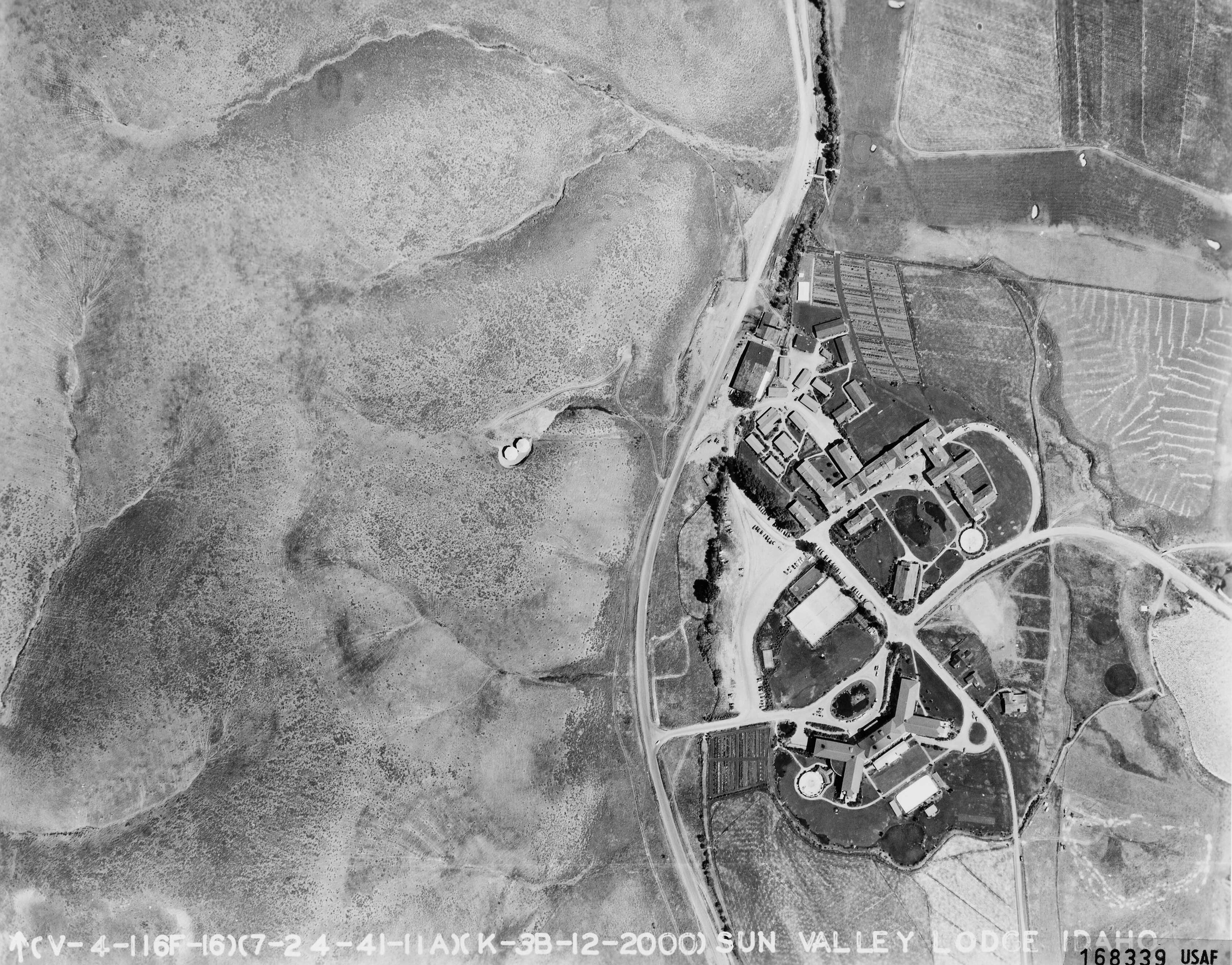
Sun Valley Lodge aerial view, 1941

=== Union Pacific Railroad (1936–1964) ===
The first destination winter resort in the U.S. was developed by W. Averell Harriman, the chairman of the Union Pacific Railroad, primarily to increase ridership on U.P. passenger trains in the Western United States. The UP's City of Portland (from Chicago and Omaha) and Portland Rose (from Kansas City) went to Shoshone in southern Idaho, where buses (then called "motor coaches") took travelers to Sun Valley. Sleeping car passengers from Los Angeles were able to take direct carriages on the UP's Pony Express from Los Angeles to Salt Lake City, and the Sun Valley Special from Salt Lake City to Sun Valley.

The success of the 1932 Winter Olympics in Lake Placid, New York, spurred an increase in participation in winter sports (and alpine skiing in particular). A lifelong skier, Harriman determined that America would embrace a destination mountain resort, similar to those enjoyed in the Swiss Alps, such as St. Moritz and Davos.

During the winter of 1935–36, Harriman enlisted the services of an Austrian Sportsman, Count Felix Schaffgotsche, to travel across the Western U.S. to locate an ideal site for a winter resort. The Count toured Mount Rainier, Mount Hood, Yosemite, the San Bernardino Mountains, Zion, Rocky Mountain National Park, the Wasatch Range, Pocatello, Jackson Hole, and Grand Targhee areas.

Late in his trip and on the verge of abandoning his search for an ideal location for a mountain resort development, he backtracked toward the Ketchum area in central Idaho. A U.P. employee in Boise had casually mentioned that the rail spur to Ketchum cost the company more money for snow removal than any other branch line and the Count went to explore.

Schaffgotsch was impressed by the combination of Bald Mountain and its surrounding mountains, adequate snowfall, abundant sunshine, moderate elevation, and absence of wind, and selected it as the site. Harriman visited several weeks later and agreed. The 3,888-acre (15.73 km^{2}) Brass Ranch was purchased for about $4 per acre and construction commenced that spring; it was built in seven months for $1.5 million. Publicist Steve Hannagan named the resort "Sun Valley" and developed the tag line: "Winter sports under a summer sun". (Count Schaffgotsch returned to Austria and was killed on the Eastern Front during World War II.) The centerpiece of the new resort was the Sun Valley Lodge, which opened on December 21, 1936.

The 220-room, X-shaped lodge's exterior was constructed of concrete, poured inside rough-sawn forms. The wood grain was impressed on the concrete finish, which was acid-stained brown to imitate wood. The Swiss-style Sun Valley Inn (originally the Challenger Inn) and village were also part of the initial resort, opening in 1937. Hannagan wanted swimming pools at the resort, "so people won't think skiing is too cold."

Both the Lodge and the Inn have heated outdoor swimming pools, circular in shape. Hannagan had the pools designed this way, unique at the time, in the hope they would be widely photographed, providing free publicity, and it worked.

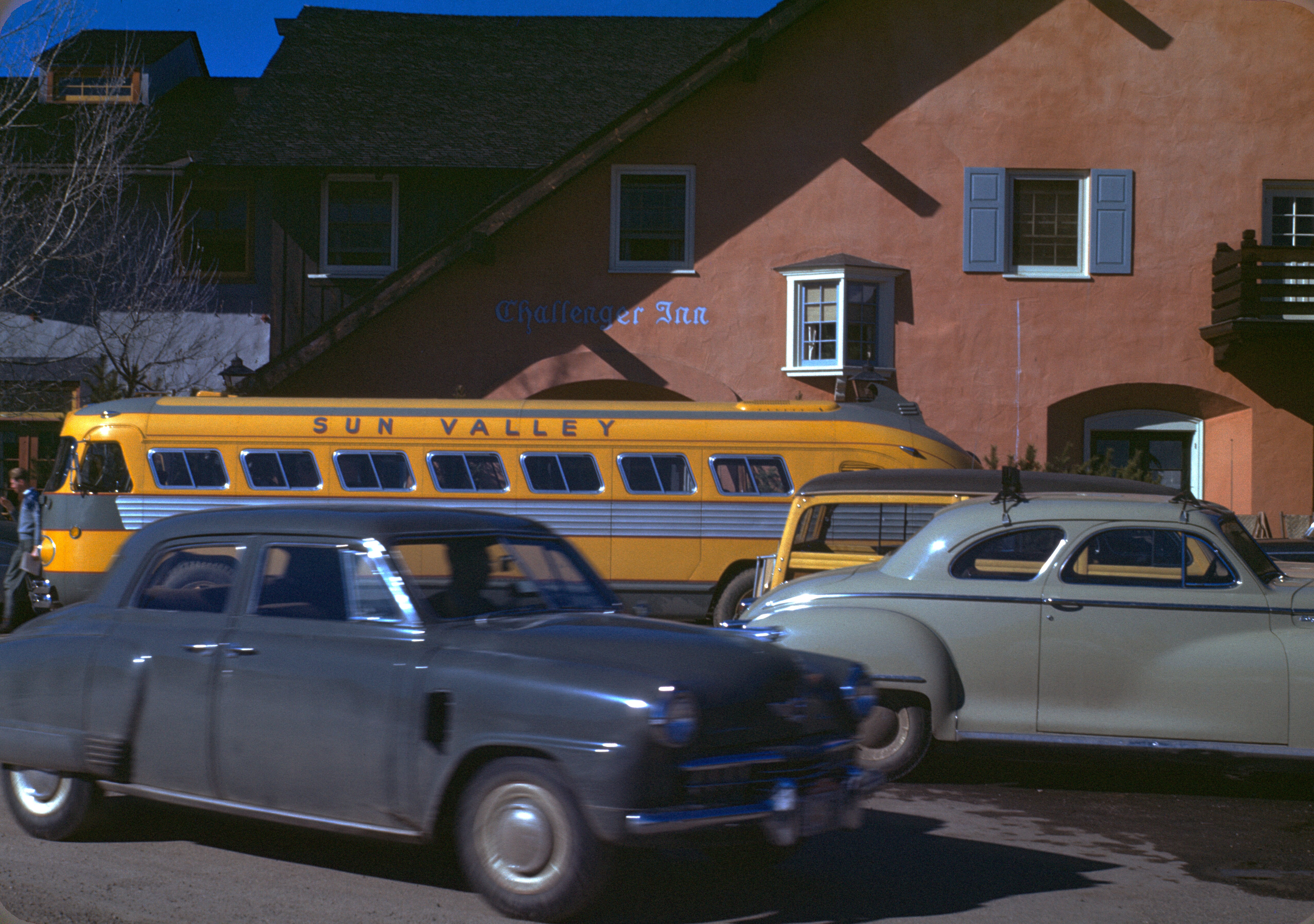
Challenger Inn, now the Sun Valley Inn, c. late 1940s

==== Chairlifts ====
Original Dollar Mountain lift operator's station (repainted)

The world's first chairlifts were installed on the resort's Proctor and Dollar mountains in the fall of 1936. (Proctor Mountain is northeast of Dollar Mountain). They have since been removed, but parts of the base of the Proctor Mountain chairlift can still be seen near the Proctor Mountain trail, along with a plaque identifying the area as the location of the world's first chairlift. Additionally, the original lift operator's station (now repainted) for the chairlift on Dollar Mountain is still standing. One of the early single chairlifts was transported to Cordova, Alaska in the 1970s where it now serves Mount Eyak Ski Area as the oldest operating chairlift in the world. The U.P. chairlift design was adapted by an engineer recalling banana loading conveyor equipment used for tropical fruit ships' cargo. Single-seat chairlifts were developed at the U.P. headquarters in Omaha in the summer of 1936. The chairlift went on to replace primitive rope tow and other adaptations seen at ski areas at the time. The original Proctor Mountain Ski Lift is listed on the National Register of Historic Places.

==== Celebrities ====
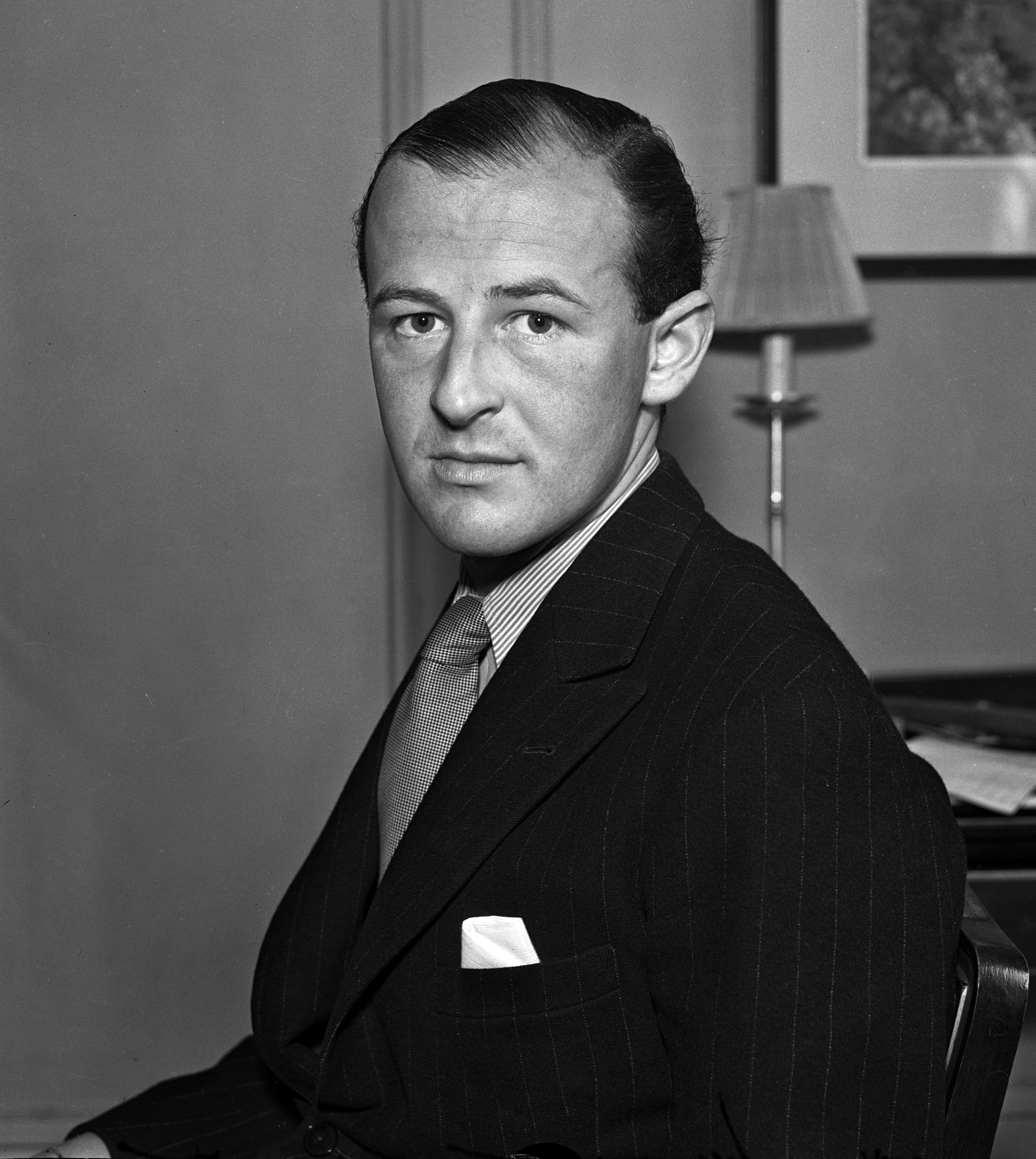
Felix von Schaffgotsch

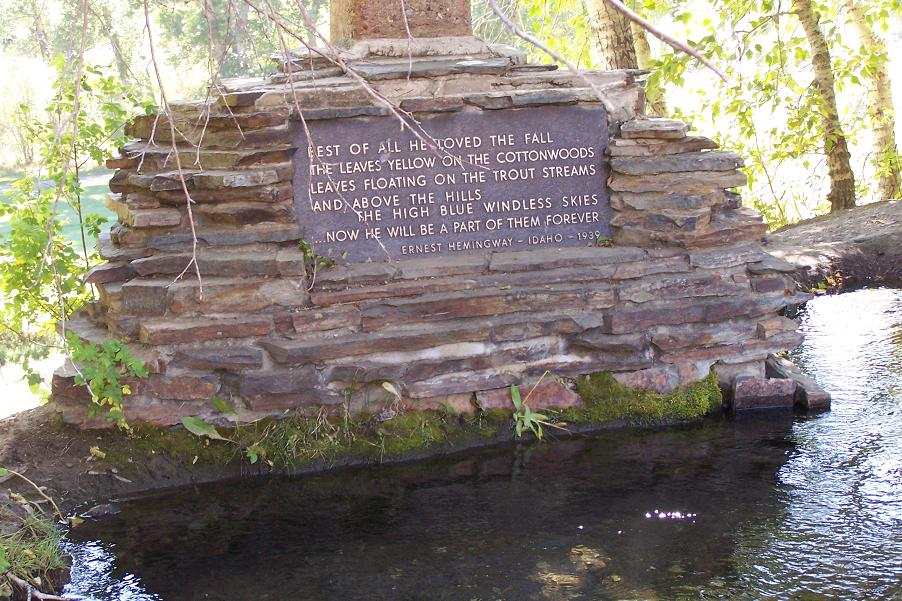
Hemingway Memorial at Trail Creek, northeast of Sun Valley

Author Ernest Hemingway completed For Whom the Bell Tolls, while staying in suite 206 of the Lodge in the fall of 1939. Averell Harriman had invited Hemingway and other celebrities, primarily from Hollywood, to the resort to help promote it.

Gary Cooper was a frequent visitor and hunting/fishing partner, as were Clark Gable, Errol Flynn, Lucille Ball, Marilyn Monroe, and several members of the Kennedy family. Hemingway was a part-time resident over the next twenty years, eventually relocating to Ketchum ("Papa" and his fourth wife are buried in the Ketchum Cemetery). The Hemingway Memorial, dedicated in 1966, is just off Trail Creek Road, about a mile northeast of the Sun Valley Lodge. You can still visit a number of locations that have Hemingway ties, including the Ketchum Cemetery.

Sun Valley was featured (and promoted) in the 1941 movie Sun Valley Serenade, starring Sonja Henie, John Payne, Milton Berle, and bandleader Glenn Miller. Scenes were shot at the resort in March 1941. Sun Valley transfer local and future gold medalist Gretchen Fraser was the skiing stand-in for Henie.

In February 1958, the cast of "I Love Lucy" filmed an episode of their follow-up series of hour-long specials, known in syndication as "The Lucy-Desi Comedy Hour", at Bald Mountain.

In 1971, Apollo 15 astronaut and avid skier Jim Irwin, when stepping upon the surface of the Moon's Hadley–Apennine, exclaimed that it was like Sun Valley.

Adam West who played Batman on television had a ranch in the area. Other notable residents have included Scott Glenn, Richard Dreyfuss, Clint Eastwood, Sondra Locke and Janet Leigh.

Sun Valley's oldest resident was former actress and silent movie star Barbara Kent. Another resident was actress Ann Sothern.

Hollywood actor, politician, and businessman, Arnold Schwarzenegger is a frequent visitor of Sun Valley and owns a residence in Ketchum, ID. He has a ski run named after him.

==== World War II ====
During World War II, the resort was closed in 1942 and converted to a convalescent hospital for the U.S. Navy (Pacific Theater), which was operational in July 1943. It re-opened to the public in December 1946.

After the war, the resort's clinic operated on the third floor of the northern wing of the Sun Valley Lodge (wing closest to the Trail Creek Rd.) until the Sun Valley Community Hospital was built in 1961. That facility was named after Dr. John Moritz when he retired in 1973; the Nebraska-born surgeon had served as the resort's year-round physician for 33 years. The Moritz Hospital was closed shortly after the new St. Luke's branch hospital opened (south of Ketchum) in November 2000 and the Moritz building now serves as employee housing.

=== Bill Janss (1964–1977) ===
After World War II, Harriman focused on his career in government service and the Union Pacific gradually lost interest in the resort. Rail service to Ketchum was discontinued in 1964 and that November the resort was sold to the Janss Investment Company, a major southern California real estate developer, headed by a former Olympic ski team member, Bill Janss (1918–96), founder of Snowmass. (Janss was an alternate on the 1940 team, but the games were cancelled due to the war). The railroad's management had called in the Janss Corporation as consultants and it was determined that it would take a lot of work and no less than $6 million for a face-lifting. The Union Pacific decided to sell and brothers Ed and Bill Janss bid just under $3 million.

During this Janss era of ownership, the north-facing Warm Springs area was developed, as well as Seattle Ridge, and condominium and home construction increased significantly. Seven chairlifts were added, and the number of trails increased from 33 to 62. The first two double chairs on Warm Springs were installed in series in 1965; the upper "Limelight" had a 2,200-foot (670 m) vertical rise, the greatest in the U.S. at the time for a chairlift.

Bill Janss bought out his brother's share of the resort and gained full control of Sun Valley in 1968. Snowmaking was introduced on a limited basis in the fall of 1975, covering 40 acres (16 ha) up to an elevation of 8,200 feet (2,500 m)

The original Seattle Ridge double chairlift was installed in 1976, but due to a very poor snow year in 1976–77 it was not operated until December 20, 1977, christened by local legend Gretchen Fraser. Janss also has a ski run named after him, called "Janss Pass", to the skier's left of the Frenchman's chairlift. Janss' wife Ann, age 54, died in early 1973 while helicopter skiing near Sun Valley.

Later that year, Janss married Mrs. Glenn Cooper, a widow, family friend, and mother of five, including World Cup racer Christin Cooper, silver medalist in the women's giant slalom at the 1984 Winter Olympics.

Under Janss' ownership, the Elkhorn area southeast of Dollar Mountain was developed by the Sun Valley Company and Johns-Manville, beginning in 1972.

During excavation, ancient tools dating back nearly 7,000 years were discovered. Elkhorn's golf course was opened in the summer of 1975.

=== Earl Holding (1977–2013) ===
Janss was running low on funds in 1977 and had entered into negotiations to sell the resort to the Walt Disney Company. While the negotiations were strung out by Disney, Earl Holding, a Utah businessman, learned of the situation through a small article in The Wall Street Journal and contacted Janss and arranged for a meeting. For about $12 million, Holding purchased Sun Valley through his company, Sinclair Oil, which operates the Grand America Hotels & Resorts. Holding was initially distrusted by many locals: "Earl is a Four Letter Word" was a popular bumper sticker in the late 1970s in Blaine County. But time proved that Holding did not buy the resort for property speculation; like his other assets he meant to operate and improve for the long-term. One of his first changes was the removal the archaic single-seat chairlift on Exhibition, replacing it with a triple. A daily lift ticket for Baldy during Holding's first season (1977–78) was priced at $13.

Under Holding's ownership there have been substantial improvements on the mountain: extensive snowmaking and grooming, high-capacity chairlifts, and the construction of four impressive day lodges, a gondola, and the renovation of the classic Roundhouse restaurant. The resort's golf course was redesigned in the late 1970s by Robert Trent Jones Jr.

In 1977, the Warm Springs side boasted 100 acres (0.40 km^{2}) of snowmaking up to an elevation of 8,200 feet (2,500 m), thought to be the highest anywhere at the time. During the late 1980s and early 1990s, snowmaking was significantly expanded on Bald Mountain. Three high-speed quad chairlifts were installed during the summer of 1988 (Christmas, Challenger, & Greyhawk).

An impressive day lodge, constructed of logs, river rock, and glass, opened at the base of Warm Springs in the fall of 1992, replacing the 1960s "Northface Hut" cafeteria. Similar day lodges were later opened at the Seattle Ridge summit (1993), and the River Run base (1995). A fire of undetermined origin damaged the Warm Springs lodge in 2018; it occurred shortly after the end of the ski season, while unoccupied at night in mid-April.

An older cafeteria, the modest one-floor "Lookout Restaurant", is 120 feet (37 m) below the summit at 9,030 feet (2,750 m), at the top of three chairlifts. Built 53 years ago in 1973, it is the ground floor of a multi-story building that was never completed, resulting in its "basement-like" atmosphere. Nevertheless, the mountain views from this near-summit lodge are quite impressive. However, the resort's recently approved master plan has the facility slated for eventual replacement.

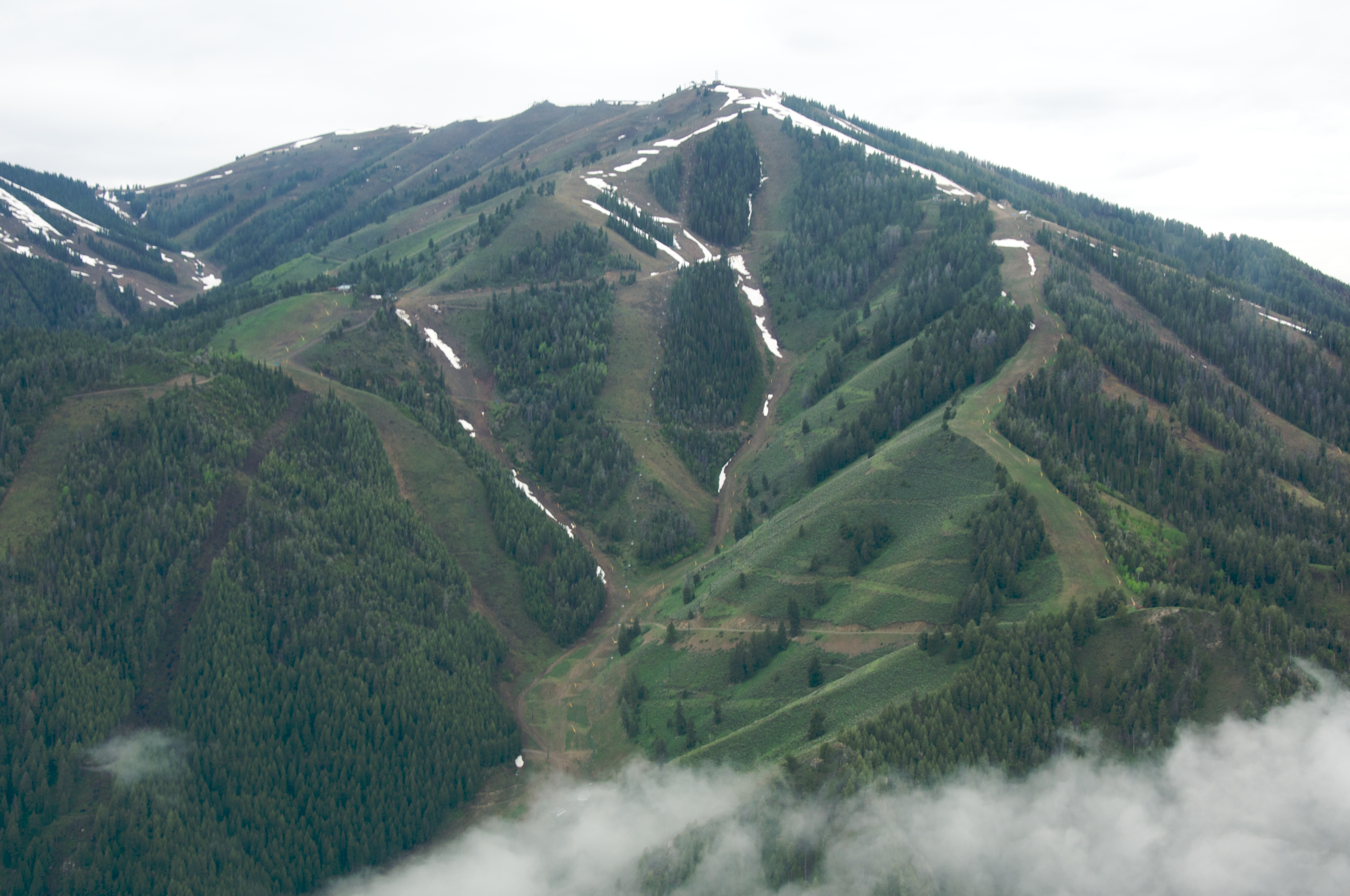
Bald Mountain in June 2009

Four additional high-speed quads were installed in the 1990s. Two of these replaced older chairlifts on River Run (1992) and Seattle Ridge (1993), and two cut brand new paths: Lookout Express (1993) and Frenchman's (1994). The chairlift from River Run was purchased by Eldora Mountain Resort in Colorado. Baldy's 13 chairlifts have a capacity of over 23,000 skiers per hour. With an average of 3,500 skiers per day (& less than 6,000 skiers per day during peak periods), Sun Valley has kept the lift lines to a minimum, a rarity among major resorts.

The Dollar Mountain Lodge opened in November 2004. This day lodge replaces the Dollar Cabin, and also serves as the headquarters for the Sun Valley Ski School. It is similar in construction to the newer day lodges at the big mountain.

The interior of the original Sun Valley Lodge has been remodeled twice during Holding's ownership, in 1985 for the golden anniversary and again in 2004. The Sun Valley Inn was also remodeled in 2018.

The Sun Valley Golf Course saw significant improvement in the summer of 2008, with the opening of the new "White Cloud Nine" course on the site of the old Gun Club (relocated further down along Trail Creek road), as well as the opening of the "Sun Valley Club", a full service golf course club house built in the style of the resort's mountain day lodges, replacing a much smaller and older facility.

The year also saw the opening of the "Sun Valley Pavilion", built in partnership with the Sun Valley Summer Symphony as a permanent home for the orchestra's annual three-and-a-half-week series of free concerts. The Pavilion is a performing arts facility that has hosted several well-known musical artists and more slated to perform in the near future.

In 2009, the resort installed the "Roundhouse Express Gondola" on Bald mountain, which runs from the mountain's River Run Base to the Roundhouse Restaurant (located midway up the mountain, at 7,700 feet (2,350 m)). The Exhibition triple chairlift (originally a single-chair in 1939) was removed with the addition of the new enclosed 8-passenger lift. The new gondola carries skiers (and non-skiers) to the restaurant for lunch and eventually dinner year-round; the mid-mountain lodge was built 87 years ago in 1939 and remodeled in 2010 to accommodate its new year-round role.

Sun Valley opened a new 380-acre (1.5 km^{2}) expansion in 2021, which included the new Broadway chairlift, a high-speed quad, and the removal of the nearby Cold Springs chairlift (fixed-grip double).

Earl Holding died in April 2013. His wife and business partner of 64 years, Carol, died December 2024. Their children Stephen, Anne & Kathleen will continue to run the resort along with vice president Pete Sontag.

In 2006, Forbes magazine estimated that Sun Valley was worth in the range of $300 million.

=== Ski racing ===
In the years before the World Cup circuit, the Harriman Cup at Sun Valley was one of the major ski races held in North America, along with the "Snow Cup" at Alta, the "Roch Cup" at Aspen Mountain, and the "Silver Belt" races at Sugar Bowl, north of Lake Tahoe. Originally known as the "Sun Valley International Open", the Harriman Cup races were the first major international ski competitions held in North America, beginning in 1937. The first three competitions of 1937–39 were held in the Boulder Mountains north of Sun Valley. Beginning in 1940, the Harriman Cup was held on the Warm Springs side of Bald Mountain, decades before chairlifts were installed on that north face of the mountain. American Dick Durrance won three of the first four Harriman Cups, stunning the overconfident Europeans.

In the final season before the launch of the World Cup, Sun Valley hosted the world's top racers in 1966 at the "American International" in late March, with a full slate of races for both men and women. With the 1966 World Championships not run until August, it was one of the biggest alpine racing events since the 1964 Olympics. The Austrians swept the men's downhill (Heini Messner, Karl Schranz, and Egon Zimmermann), while Jean-Claude Killy of France won the slalom, with Schranz as runner-up. The two switched places in the one-run giant slalom. Erika Schinegger of Austria, Nancy Greene of Canada, and Marielle Goitschel of France were the top three in the women's downhill, while Goitschel and teammate Annie Famose finished 1–2 in the slalom. Goitschel, Greene, and Famose were the top finishers in the giant slalom and France took the overall team title.

In March 1975 and 1977, Sun Valley hosted World Cup ski races, with slalom and giant slalom events for both men and women, run on the Warm Springs side of the mountain.

The 1975 slalom was won by Gustavo Thoeni, the dominant World Cup skier of the early 1970s (which turned out to be his last win in the slalom discipline). A young Ingemar Stenmark of Sweden, perhaps the greatest technical ski racer ever, took the giant slalom title both years. Thoeni and Stenmark left Idaho tied in the overall standings in 1975, which Thoeni won in the finals of a parallel slalom the next week in Italy. Phil Mahre of White Pass, Washington, age 19, won the 1977 slalom race over Stenmark, with twin brother Steve placing third. It was Phil's second win (he had won a GS in France in December), but his first victory in the slalom and first in the U.S., and being from the Northwest, very close to home.

The present ownership has declined to host any World Cup races since, as it involves closing off runs for a significant time. But during the 2002 Winter Olympics in Salt Lake (about 300 miles (480 km) to the southeast), Sun Valley was used as a training site for many nations' alpine and Nordic ski teams. The alpine speed events for the Olympics were held at a sister resort, Snowbasin, outside of Ogden, Utah.

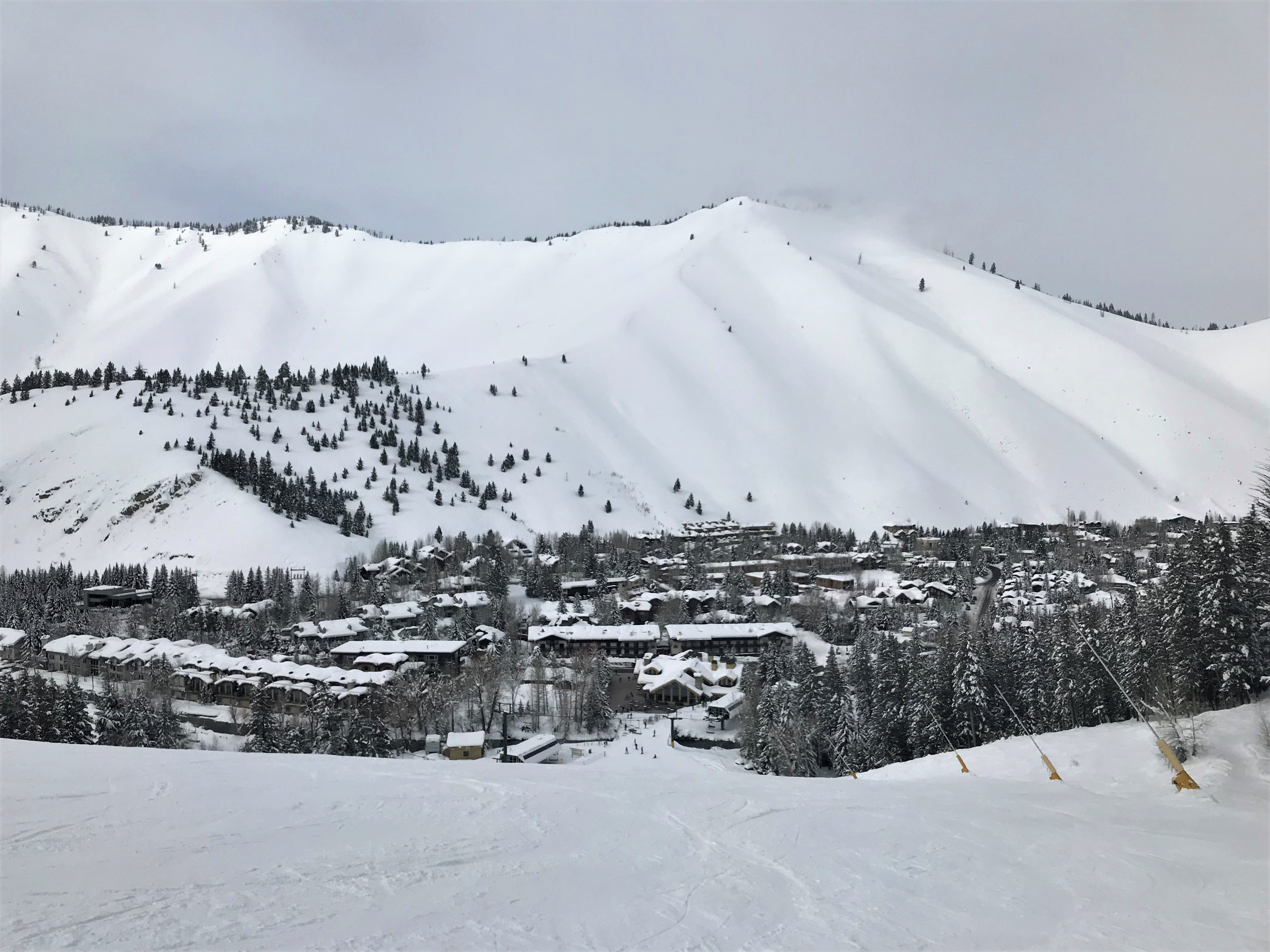
Warm Springs, U.S. Alpine Championship Run in 2016, 2018

Sun Valley hosted the U.S. Alpine Championships in 2016 and 2018, held after the World Cup season in March; it previously hosted the event in 1951.

Olympic medalists from Sun Valley include Gretchen Fraser, Christin Cooper, Picabo Street, snowboarder Kaitlyn Farrington, and disabled skier Muffy Davis, a founding and honorary board member of Sun Valley Adaptive Sports. All five have runs named after them on Bald Mountain: three are on Seattle Ridge (Gretchen's Gold, Christin's Silver (ex-Silver Fox) and Muffy's Medals (ex-Southern Comfort)), Picabo's Street (ex-Plaza) on Warm Springs, and Kaitlyn's Bowl (ex-Farout Bowl) on the Bowls. US TV's legendary sports commentator Tim Ryan (CBS/NBC) lives in Sun Valley, as well as Ski Racing Magazine's proud owner, Gary Black Jr.

The World Cup finals (8 events) were held in Sun Valley for the first time in March 2025; the two downhills on the Challenger course were cancelled due to high winds, following a delay due to snowfall. The finals are scheduled to return in March 2027.

== Culture ==
In 1937 the Sun Valley Opera House was built. The non-profit Sun Valley Museum of Arts (SVMoA) was initiated in 1969 by Mrs. Glenn Cooper and Bill Janss, who later married. It attained non-profit status and was officially founded in 1971; the original 5-acre (2.0 ha) campus was located off Dollar Road in Sun Valley. Studios and workshops were open to the public and focused on ceramics, founded by James Romberg; photography, founded by Sheri Heiser and Peter deLory; and fine arts, founded by David W. Wharton. The SVC offered year-round workshops, lectures, and exhibitions by nationally recognized artists and craft persons to both residents and tourists to Blaine County. Later, the Sun Valley Center for the Arts acquired its main building in nearby Ketchum as well as a historic house and classroom in Hailey.

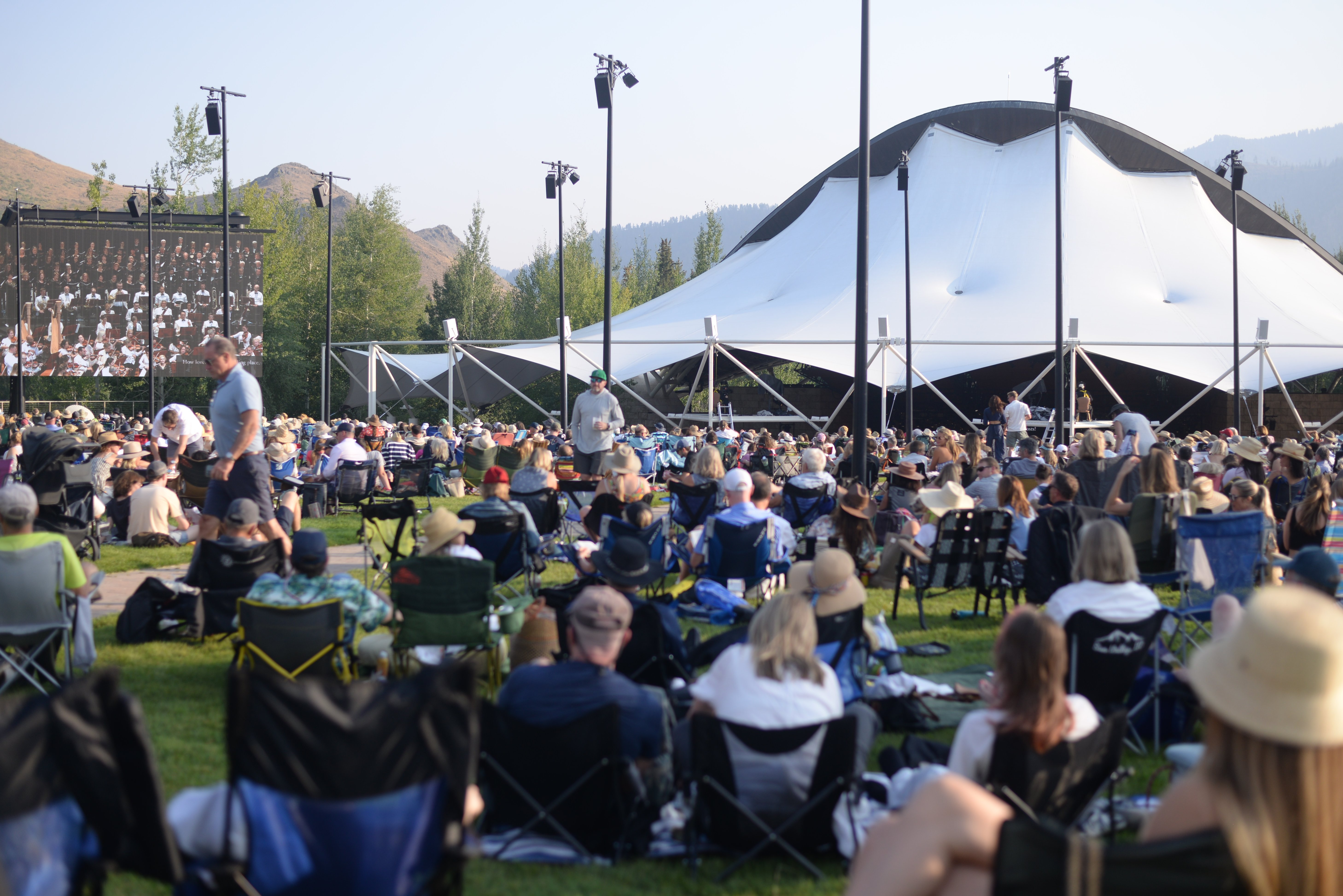
Concertgoers at the Sun Valley Music Festival, listening to Brahm's Requiem.

Sun Valley has hosted the Sun Valley Music Festival since 1984, a free classical music festival held in summer at the Sun Valley Pavilion and the surrounding lawn. Concerts have seen over 11,000 attendees.

Sun Valley also hosts the Sun Valley Film Festival since 2012.

The annual Sun Valley Writers' Conference (SVWC) was founded by journalist Reva B. Tooley, with the inaugural event run in 1995. As of 2022 Robin Eidsmo is executive director (since 2014), and novelist John Burnham Schwartz, essayist Anne Taylor Fleming, and Pulitzer Prize-winner Liaquat Ahamed help to mount the event each year.

In 2018, The Argyros Performing Arts Center opened in downtown Ketchum. Since opening, the 450-seat theater has hosted nationally and internationally recognized artists such as Robert Cray, Jean-Yves Thibaudet, Isabella Boylston, Peter Cetera, Kristen Chenoweth, Rita Wilson, and others.

== Adaptive sports for the disabled ==
The Sun Valley region boasts a wide variety of year-round adaptive sports programs for disabled people including the local DSUSA Chapter – Higher Ground Sun Valley; Wood River Ability Program; Sage Brush Equine Training Center for the Handicapped and Camp Rainbow Gold, a youth cancer program.

== Two sections ==
A small mountain saddle splits the city of Sun Valley into two sections. The northern section is centered around the famous Sun Valley Lodge, Inn, and the "village" complex of shops, condominiums, and original 18-hole golf course (27 holes by 2008), which winds its way up the Trail Creek valley to the northeast. This area is referred to as simply "Sun Valley".

The southern area of Elkhorn, adjacent to Dollar Mountain, has its own condo complex and 18-hole golf course. Quite distinct and separate, including a drier "sagebrush" appearance, it was initially developed in 1972. The Sun Valley Company took over day-to-day operations of the Elkhorn Golf Club in July 2011 and named Rick Hickman director of golf operations for the company.

Adjacent to Sun Valley is the older city of Ketchum, which is just a mile downstream of the Sun Valley Lodge (along Trail Creek). Ketchum comprises primarily the 19th-century town center (with its limited grid system) and lands adjacent to Bald Mountain along the Big Wood River and Warm Springs Creek.

The Sun Valley/Ketchum CVB offers area wide information on events, vacation planning information and area resources.

On September 11, 2005, the Dalai Lama visited Wood River High School in Hailey to give a speech on understanding and friendship in remembrance of the September 11, 2001 Attacks and offered condolences to the many thousands affected by the recent Hurricane Katrina.

== Geography ==
According to the United States Census Bureau, the city has a total area of 9.89 square miles (25.61 km^{2}), of which, 9.88 square miles (25.59 km^{2}) is land and 0.01 square miles (0.03 km^{2}) is water.

=== Climate ===
The climate of Sun Valley is classified as dry-summer humid continental (Dsb), just narrowly avoiding a subarctic (Dsc) classification. Due to the altitude and aridity of the climate diurnal temperature variation is high, with summer swings especially significant with hot days combined with nights just above the freezing mark in July and August. Sub-zero nights are common in winter, while days usually average around freezing.

Climate data for Sun Valley, Idaho
Month	Jan	Feb	Mar	Apr	May	Jun	Jul	Aug	Sep	Oct	Nov	Dec	Year
Mean daily maximum °F (°C)	30.0 (−1.1)	35.9 (2.2)	40.2 (4.6)	52.1 (11.2)	63.9 (17.7)	71.3 (21.8)	82.5 (28.1)	81.6 (27.6)	72.3 (22.4)	60.5 (15.8)	44.0 (6.7)	32.4 (0.2)	55.6 (13.1)
Mean daily minimum °F (°C)	0.3 (−17.6)	3.6 (−15.8)	9.5 (−12.5)	21.5 (−5.8)	29.2 (−1.6)	34.5 (1.4)	38.3 (3.5)	37.0 (2.8)	29.9 (−1.2)	22.8 (−5.1)	14.4 (−9.8)	3.6 (−15.8)	20.4 (−6.4)
Average precipitation inches (mm)	2.59 (66)	1.61 (41)	1.17 (30)	0.96 (24)	1.61 (41)	1.67 (42)	0.73 (19)	0.84 (21)	0.89 (23)	0.93 (24)	1.64 (42)	2.61 (66)	17.25 (439)
Average snowfall inches (cm)	36.0 (91)	19.0 (48)	13.8 (35)	4.0 (10)	1.4 (3.6)	0 (0)	0 (0)	0 (0)	0.5 (1.3)	2.3 (5.8)	12.1 (31)	32.0 (81)	121.1 (306.7)

== Demographics ==
Historical population
Census	Pop.	Note	%±
1950	428		—
1960	317		−25.9%
1970	180		−43.2%
1980	545		202.8%
1990	938		72.1%
2000	1,427		52.1%
2010	1,406		−1.5%
2020	1,783		26.8%
U.S. Decennial Census

=== 2020 census ===
As of the 2020 census, Sun Valley had a population of 1,783. The median age was 61.4 years. 11.2% of residents were under the age of 18 and 43.0% of residents were 65 years of age or older. For every 100 females there were 96.1 males, and for every 100 females age 18 and over there were 96.4 males age 18 and over.

79.4% of residents lived in urban areas, while 20.6% lived in rural areas.

There were 932 households in Sun Valley, of which 12.6% had children under the age of 18 living in them. Of all households, 50.2% were married-couple households, 20.8% were households with a male householder and no spouse or partner present, and 25.4% were households with a female householder and no spouse or partner present. About 37.0% of all households were made up of individuals and 19.1% had someone living alone who was 65 years of age or older.

There were 2,794 housing units, of which 66.6% were vacant. The homeowner vacancy rate was 3.4% and the rental vacancy rate was 32.6%.

Racial composition as of the 2020 census
Race	Number	Percent
White	1,652	92.7%
Black or African American	6	0.3%
American Indian and Alaska Native	0	0.0%
Asian	10	0.6%
Native Hawaiian and Other Pacific Islander	0	0.0%
Some other race	19	1.1%
Two or more races	96	5.4%
Hispanic or Latino (of any race)	50	2.8%

=== 2010 census ===
As of the census of 2010, there were 1,406 people, 622 households, and 367 families residing in the city. The population density was 142.3 inhabitants per square mile (54.9/km^{2}). There were 2,597 housing units at an average density of 262.9 per square mile (101.5/km^{2}). The racial makeup of the city was 96.4% White, 0.2% African American, 0.2% Native American, 0.8% Asian, 0.1% Pacific Islander, 1.0% from other races, and 1.3% from two or more races. Hispanic or Latino of any race were 4.6% of the population.

There were 622 households, of which 15.4% had children under the age of 18 living with them, 53.5% were married couples living together, 4.0% had a female householder with no husband present, 1.4% had a male householder with no wife present, and 41.0% were non-families. 34.6% of all households were made up of individuals, and 14.6% had someone living alone who was 65 years of age or older. The average household size was 1.95 and the average family size was 2.45.

The median age in the city was 53.9 years. 11.5% of residents were under the age of 18; 7.3% were between the ages of 18 and 24; 18.8% were from 25 to 44; 32.1% were from 45 to 64; and 30.1% were 65 years of age or older. The gender makeup of the city was 50.8% male and 49.2% female.

=== 2000 census ===
As of the census of 2000, there were 1,427 people, 594 households, and 343 families residing in the city. The population density was 144.6 inhabitants per square mile (55.8/km^{2}). There were 2,339 housing units at an average density of 237.1 per square mile (91.5/km^{2}). The racial makeup of the city was 92.43% White, 0.35% African American, 0.42% Native American, 0.77% Asian, 4.20% from other races, and 1.82% from two or more races. Hispanic or Latino of any race were 7.15% of the population.

There were 594 households, out of which 16.3% had children under the age of 18 living with them, 52.5% were married couples living together, 4.2% had a female householder with no husband present, and 42.1% were non-families. 34.7% of all households were made up of individuals, and 10.3% had someone living alone who was 65 years of age or older. The average household size was 1.97 and the average family size was 2.50.

In the city, the population was spread out, with 11.9% under the age of 18, 12.2% from 18 to 24, 21.9% from 25 to 44, 36.7% from 45 to 64, and 17.3% who were 65 years of age or older. The median age was 48 years. For every 100 females, there were 104.4 males. For every 100 females age 18 and over, there were 105.4 males.

The median income for a household in the city was $71,000, and the median income for a family was $85,000. Males had a median income of $31,979 versus $27,143 for females. The per capita income for the city was $50,563. About 2.7% of families and 14.9% of the population were below the poverty line, including 15.7% of those under age 18 and 2.4% of those age 65 or over.

== Education ==
Blaine County School District is the school district for the entire county.

The zoned schools are Ernest Hemingway STEAM School (for K-5), Wood River Middle School, and Wood River High School.

The county is in the catchment area, but not the taxation zone, for College of Southern Idaho.

== Sun Valley in popular culture ==
- Part of Abbott and Costello's 1943 film Hit the Ice was shot at Sun Valley.
- "It Happened in Sun Valley" was recorded and featured by Glenn Miller and His Orchestra in the movie Sun Valley Serenade.
- Exterior filming for Duchess of Idaho was shot and set in Sun Valley.
- The movies Bus Stop (1956) starring Marilyn Monroe, I Met Him in Paris (1937), Sun Valley Serenade (1941), and Ski Party (1965) were partly filmed in Sun Valley.

== Television ==
- RSN, Ch. 14

== Notable people ==
- Tina Barney (born 1945) – photographer
- Isabella Boylston (born 1986) – ballet dancer
- Joe Cannon (born 1975) – soccer player
- Hilary Knight (born 1989) - professional hockey player and five-time Olympian
- Debbie McDonald (born 1954) – dressage rider and 2004 Olympian
- Warren Miller (1924–2018) – filmmaker
- Genevieve Padalecki (born 1981) – actress
- Carson Palmer (born 1979) – National Football League (NFL) player
- John V. Tunney (1934–2018) – US senator for California
- Kelly Collins (born 1965) – racing driver

== See also ==
- Allen & Company Sun Valley Conference
- Magic Valley
- The Ski Tour
- Treasure Valley
- Wood River Valley
