= Trail Creek (Rogue River tributary) =

Stream in Oregon, U.S.

Coordinates: 42°38′45″N 122°48′32″W

Trail Creek is a stream in the U.S. state of Oregon. It is a tributary to Rogue River.

Trail Creek was named from an old Indian trail which followed its course.
