= Sun Valley Opera House =

Coordinates: 43.6959°N 114.3531°W

The Sun Valley Opera House was built in 1937 in Sun Valley, Idaho, as a movie theater. The picturesque Opera House has a 344-seat capacity and a state-of-the-art sound system (installed in 1999). It is the site for special events and as well as nightly showing of first-run movies. It is located in the Sun Valley Village, near the Sun Valley Lodge and Sun Valley Inn.

During the summer and winter seasons, the 1941 movie "Sun Valley Serenade" is shown free of charge daily at 5:00 pm. At other times of the year it is shown free of charge at 4:30 pm on Tuesdays, Thursdays, and Sundays.
