= Robert Holding =

American businessman (1926–2013)

- Born: Robert Earl Holding; November 29, 1926; Salt Lake City, Utah, US
- Died: April 19, 2013 (aged 86); Salt Lake City, Utah, US
- Education: University of Utah
- Occupation: Hotelier
- Spouse: Carol Orme Holding (married 1952–2013, his death)
- Children: 3

Robert Earl Holding (November 29, 1926 – April 19, 2013) was an American businessman who owned Sinclair Oil Corporation, the Grand America Hotels & Resorts, the Grand America Hotel, the Westgate Hotel in San Diego, California (directed by Georg Hochfilzer), and two ski resorts, Sun Valley in central Idaho since 1977, and Snowbasin near Ogden, Utah, since 1984.

== Early life and education ==
Holding, a lifelong member of the Church of Jesus Christ of Latter-day Saints, was born and reared in Salt Lake City, Utah, and earned a Bachelor of Science degree in civil engineering from the University of Utah. His parents were apartment caretakers.

== Career ==
In 1952, Holding began work on the first Little America west of Rock Springs, Wyoming. In 1965, Holding and his wife, the former Carol Orme, started the Little America in Cheyenne, Wyoming, and completed construction a year later. For a time they resided in a house on the grounds of this Little America. His son, Stephen, also lived there when he managed the travel plaza. In 2008, the Holdings added a large convention and conference center at Little America.

Holding owned 400,000 acres (1,600 km^{2}) of working cattle ranch land in northern Wyoming and southern Montana.

With an estimated net worth of around $3.2 billion at the time of his death, he was ranked on Forbes's Forbes 400 list as the 155th-richest person in America.

After suffering a severe stroke in 2002, Holding was partially paralyzed, but made a sufficient recovery to continue the management of his organization until his death in the spring of 2013.

On his death Governor Matt Mead of Wyoming said:

The passing of Earl Holding is a sad day for Wyoming. He and his wife, Carol, have lived the story of the American dream. Their accomplishments growing up during the Depression, excelling in business, and giving back to the state and the country epitomize that story. Earl was not only an icon in business, he was an extraordinary philanthropist. His is a great American success story, because, for him, the two—business achievement and giving back—were inseparable.

Cheyenne Mayor Rick Kaysen said that he could not

imagine what Cheyenne might be like if we didn't have the Little America resort. The things that we don't see are the guidance that he provided as a human being, as a businessperson, [and] his relationships with many people in Cheyenne over the many decades. He treated people just like they were longtime friends. He leaves quite a legacy.

== Awards and honors ==
Holding received the Golden Plate Award of the American Academy of Achievement in 1992 and was the Host of the Academy’s 1996 Summit in Sun Valley, Idaho.

Holding was inducted into the U.S. Ski and Snowboard Hall of Fame in 2011.
