= Emmanuel Church =

Emmanuel Church or Immanuel Church may refer to:

== Christian denominations ==
- Emmanuel Association, a Methodist Christian denomination in the conservative holiness movement

== Local churches ==
=== Canada ===
- Emmanuel United Church

=== Denmark ===
- Immanuel Church, Copenhagen

=== England ===
- Emmanuel United Reformed Church, Cambridge - now Downing Place United Reformed Church, Cambridge
- Immanuel Church, Feniscowles, Lancashire
- Emmanuel Church, Nottingham, Nottinghamshire
- Immanuel Church, Oswaldtwistle, Lancashire
- Emmanuel Church, Preston, Lancashire
- Emmanuel Church, West Hampstead, London.
- Emmanuel Church, Woodley, Berkshire

=== India ===
- Emmanuel Church, Mumbai

=== Indonesia ===
- Immanuel Church, Jakarta

=== Israel ===
- Immanuel Church (Tel Aviv-Yafo)

=== Sweden ===
- Immanuel Church, Jönköping
- Immanuel Church, Norrköping
- Immanuel Church, Stockholm

=== Switzerland ===
- Emmanuel Episcopal Church (Geneva)

=== Syria ===
- Emmanuel Church, Aleppo, seat of the Union of the Armenian Evangelical Churches in the Near East

=== United States ===
- Emmanuel Church of the Evangelical Association of Binghamton, New York
- Emmanuel Church at Brook Hill, Henrico, Virginia, listed on the NRHP in Virginia
- Emmanuel Church (Greenwood, Virginia), listed on the NRHP in Virginia
- Emmanuel Church (Killingworth, Connecticut), listed on the U.S. National Register of Historic Places (NRHP)
- Immanuel Church (La Grange, Tennessee)
- Emmanuel Church (Newport, Rhode Island), listed on the NRHP in Rhode Island
- Emmanuel Church (Port Conway, Virginia), listed on the NRHP in Virginia
- Living Word International Christian Church (formerly Immanuel's Church) (Silver Spring, Maryland)

== See also ==
- Emmanuel Baptist Church (disambiguation)
- Emmanuel Episcopal Church (disambiguation)
- Emmanuel Lutheran Church (disambiguation)
