= Immanuel Lutheran Church =

Immanuel Church or Immanuel Lutheran Church, Immanuel Evangelical Church, or Immanuel Evangelical Lutheran Church may refer to:

in Israel

- Immanuel Church (Tel Aviv-Yafo)

in the United States (by state)

- Immanuel Evangelical Lutheran Church (Boise, Idaho)
- Immanuel Hall, Hinsdale, Illinois, formerly known as Immanuel Evangelical Church
- Immanuel Lutheran Church (Valparaiso, Indiana)
- Immanuel Lutheran Church (Red Wing, Minnesota)
- Immanuel Lutheran Church (Altenburg, Missouri)
- Immanuel Lutheran Church (Perryville, Missouri)
- Immanuel Evangelical Lutheran Church (Pilot Knob, Missouri)
- Immanuel Lutheran Church (Springer, New Mexico), listed on the National Register of Historic Places
- Immanuel Lutheran Church (Murdo, South Dakota)
- Immanuel Lutheran Church (Zeona, South Dakota)
- Immanuel Church (La Grange, Tennessee)
- Immanuel Lutheran Church (Houston, Texas)
- Immanuel Lutheran Church (Seattle, Washington)

== See also ==
- Emmanuel Lutheran Church (disambiguation)
