= Emmanuel Episcopal Church =

Emmanuel Episcopal Church may refer to:

- Emmanuel Church (Killingworth, Connecticut)
- Emmanuel Episcopal Church (Hailey, Idaho)
- Emmanuel Episcopal Church (La Grange, Illinois)
- Emmanuel Episcopal Church (Cumberland, Maryland)
- Emmanuel Episcopal Church, Boston, Massachusetts
- Emmanuel Episcopal Church (Miles City, Montana)
- Emmanuel Episcopal Church (Elmira, New York)
- Emmanuel Episcopal Church (Little Falls, New York)
- Emmanuel Episcopal Church (Pittsburgh, Pennsylvania)
- Emmanuel Episcopal Church (Cumberland, Rhode Island)
- Emmanuel Church (Newport, Rhode Island)
- Emmanuel Episcopal Church (Rapid City, South Dakota), listed on the NRHP in South Dakota
- Emmanuel Episcopal Church (Lockhart, Texas), a National Register of Historic Places listing in Caldwell County, Texas
- Emmanuel Episcopal Church (San Angelo, Texas)
- Emmanuel Episcopal Church (Alexandria, Virginia)
- Emmanuel Episcopal Church (Port Conway, Virginia)
- Emmanuel Episcopal Church (Powhatan, Virginia)
- Emmanuel Church at Brook Hill, Richmond, Virginia
- Emmanuel Episcopal Church (Eastsound, Washington)
- Emmanuel Episcopal Church (Geneva), Switzerland

== See also ==
- Emmanuel Church (disambiguation)
