= Chatfield Trail =

Hiking trail in Connecticut, United States

Coordinates: 41°21′51.5″N 72°35′4.6″W

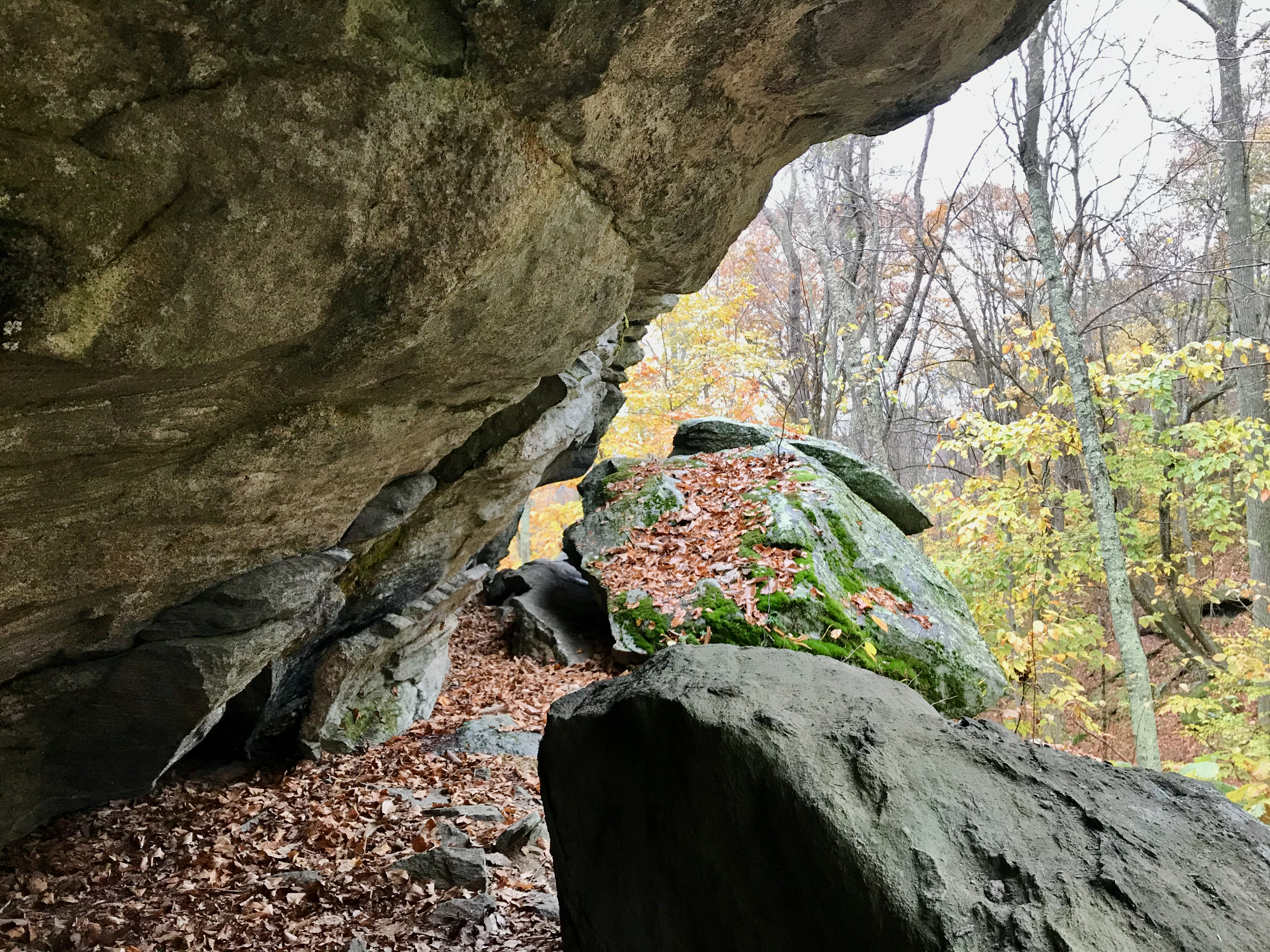
- One of the Chatfield Trail rock caves (and formations) which hikers squeeze through
- Length: 4.6 miles (7.4 km)
- Location: Middlesex County, Connecticut, USA
- Designation: CFPA Blue-Blazed Trail
- Trailheads: Start: Connecticut Route 80, Killingworth; End: Paper Mill Road, Killingworth
- Use: Hiking, cross-country skiing, snowshoeing, fishing, geocaching
- Highest point: 890 ft (270 m)
- Lowest point: Hammonasset River along southern Paper Mill Road
- Difficulty: Moderate with some easy and hard sections
- Sights: Fat man's squeeze and other rock formations, Forster Pond, Deer Lake
- Hazards: hunters, deer ticks, poison ivy

The Chatfield Trail is a 4.6-mile Blue-Blazed hiking trail located within the town of Killingworth, Connecticut, United States.

The northern trailhead is directly across from Chatfield Hollow State Park on Route 80. There is a good parking area outside the park's entrance. The trailhead is well marked on the south side of Route 80 just across the street from the park's entrance. The one-way route is 4.6 miles to the southern trailhead on River Road, though there is also a 0.75-mile alternate trail that loops off the main trail.

There is also a second northern trailhead entrance on the south side of Route 80, about 0.3 miles west of the park entrance where there is a rough pullover area for four or five cars. From this old trailhead, one can take a short 0.1-mile Blue and White trail east to the Blue-Blaze trail.

The northern section of the trail is located within Cockaponset State Forest. The southern sections of the trail pass near Deer Lake Camp and through privately owned property ending at River Road, just west of the intersection of Papermill Road and River Road. River Road has a small pullover for one or two cars that can be used to access the southern trailhead.
