= Dakota, Nebraska =

Dakota, Nebraska may refer to:

- Dakota City, Nebraska
- Dakota County, Nebraska
