= Parmelee House =

Parmelee House may refer to:

- Parmelee House (Killingworth, Connecticut), listed on the National Register of Historic Places in Middlesex County, Connecticut, United States
- Parmelee House (Valley City, Ohio), listed on the National Register of Historic Places in Medina County, Ohio
