= Oak Lodge =

- U.S. National Register of Historic Places
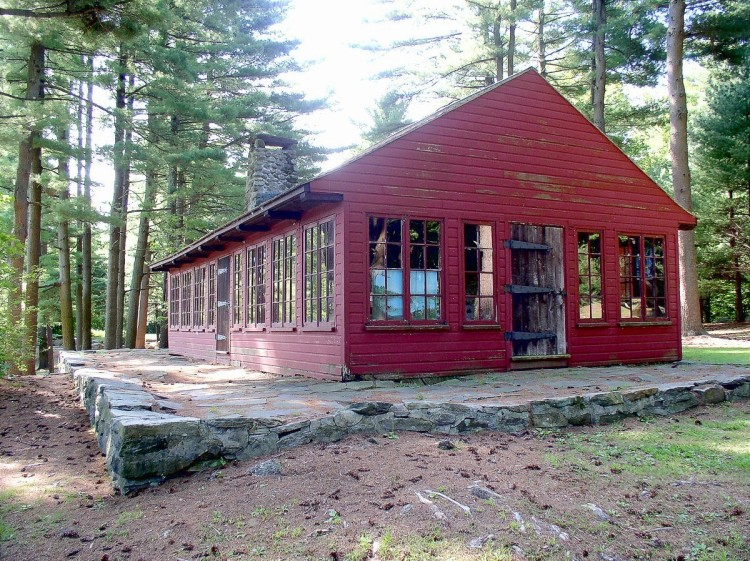

- Location within Connecticut Location within the United States
- Location: West Side of Schreeder Pond, Chatfield Hollow State Park, Killingworth, Connecticut
- Coordinates: 41°22′11″N 72°35′27″W
- Area: 12.5 acres (5.1 ha)
- Built: 1936
- Architect: Civilian Conservation Corps
- Architectural style: Rustic
- MPS: Connecticut State Park and Forest Depression-Era Federal Work Relief Programs Structures TR
- NRHP reference No.: 86001734
- Added to NRHP: September 4, 1986

Oak Lodge is a historic recreational building, located on the west side of Schreeder Pond in Chatfield Hollow State Park in Killingworth, Connecticut. Built in 1937, it is one of Connecticut's finest examples of construction by crews of the Civilian Conservation Corps (CCC). It, along with Schreeder Pond and other CCC-built park features, was listed on the National Register of Historic Places in 1986.

== Description and history ==
Schreeder Pond is a central feature of Chatfield Hollow State Park, located in central southern Connecticut. It is an artificial pond 6.67 acres (2.70 ha) in size, created by CCC labor in 1934. A beach area on the right sides includes simply styled CCC-built bathhouses. Oak Lodge is located near the southern end of the pond on its west side. It is a rectangular single-story structure, with a fieldstone chimney, bellcast gabled roof, and exterior clad in novelty siding. Multilight wooden casement windows line its sides, and it has several entrances, each with a door made of vertical boards and fastened with wrought iron strap hinges. The interior of the building is a single large chamber with a kitchen area at one end. The roof trusses are exposed, there is a large stone fireplace, and other original features survive.

The lodge and other amenities were built in the 1930s as part of a planned development of recreational activities within Cockaponset State Forest. The pond, named for a state forest supervisor, was created by damming Chatfield Hollow Creek at the southern end. In building the lodge, the CCC benefited from the construction excellence of its masons, wrought-iron smiths, and woodworkers, and some of their best work is shown in Oak Lodge. The property was covered in a 1985 Connecticut statewide study of 15 depression-era CCC, FERA, CWA, and WPA structures.

== See also ==
- National Register of Historic Places listings in Middlesex County, Connecticut
