= Emmanuel Lutheran Church =

Emmanuel Lutheran Church may refer to:

- Emmanuel Lutheran Church (R M Lumsden, Saskatchewan)
- Emmanuel Lutheran Church (Dakota City, Nebraska)
- Emmanuel Lutheran Church (Lincolnton, North Carolina)
- Emmanuel Lutheran Church and Cemetery, Ralph, South Dakota
- Emmanuel Lutheran Church of Harlemville and Cemetery, New York

== See also ==
- Emanuel Lutheran Church of Montra, Ohio
- Immanuel Lutheran Church (disambiguation)
