= Chatfield Hollow State Park =

State park in Connecticut, United States

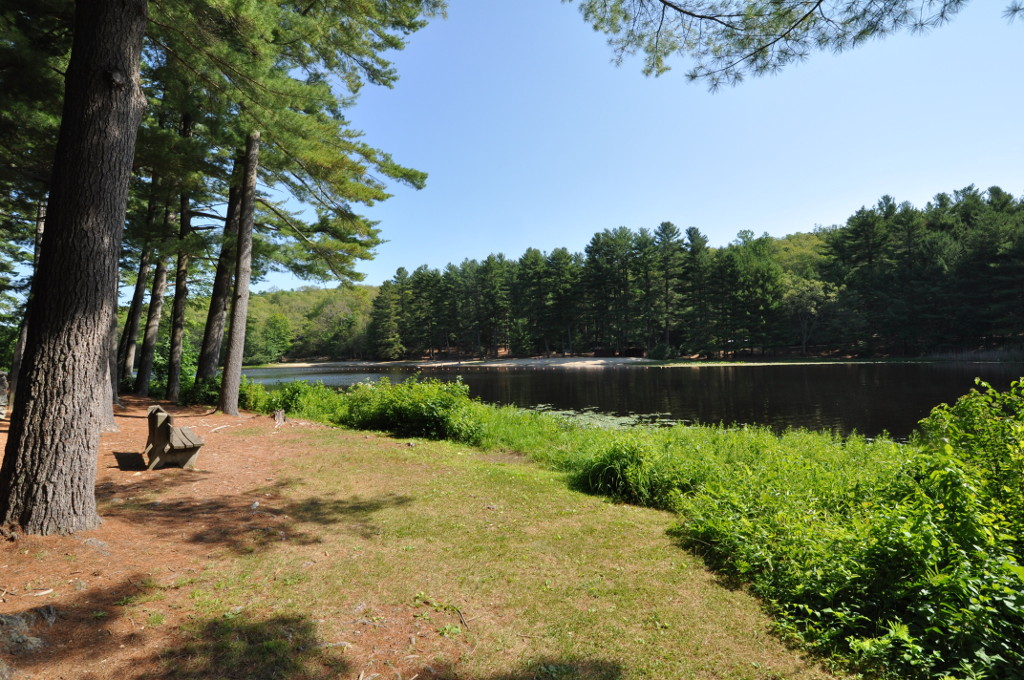
- Schreeder Pond

- Location within Connecticut Location within the United States
- Interactive map of Chatfield Hollow State Park
- Location: Killingworth, Connecticut, United States
- Coordinates: 41°22′10″N 72°35′23″W
- Area: 412 acres (167 ha)
- Elevation: 144 ft (44 m)
- Established: 1949
- Administrator: Connecticut Department of Energy and Environmental Protection
- Designation: Connecticut state park
- Website: Official website

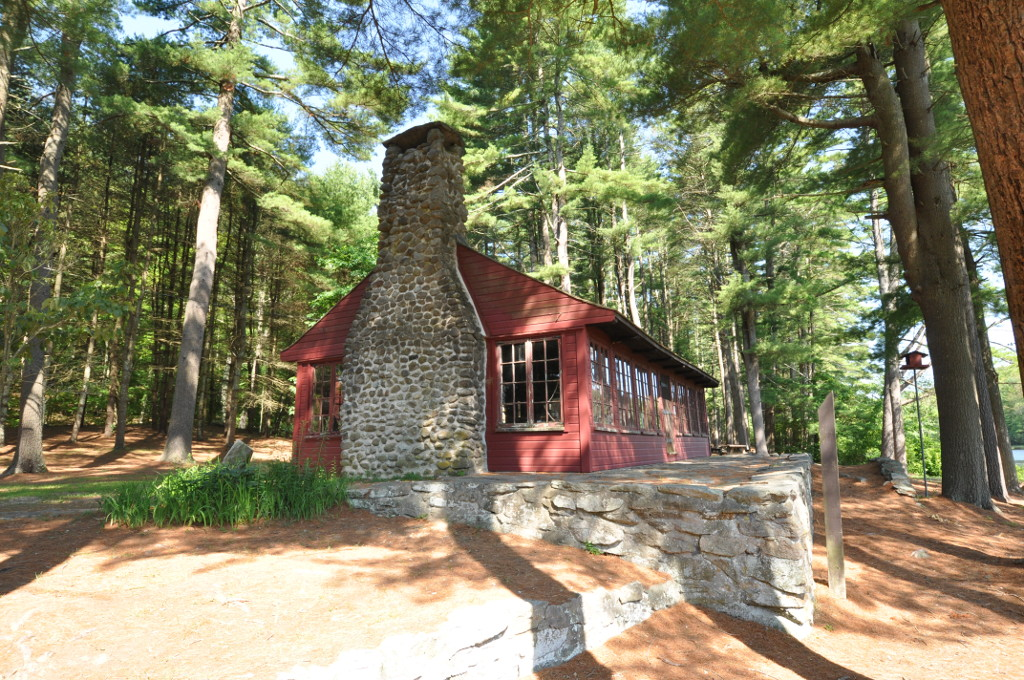
Oak Lodge

Chatfield Hollow State Park is a public recreation area occupying 412 acres (167 ha) that lie adjacent to Cockaponset State Forest in the town of Killingworth, Connecticut. The state park offers hiking trails, a swimming beach, trout fishing, mountain biking, rock climbing, and picnicking areas. Park attractions include 6.67-acre (2.70 ha) Schreeder Pond, Indian caves, historic sites, a restored water wheel, and a reproduction covered bridge. The park is managed by the Connecticut Department of Energy and Environmental Protection.

== History ==
Chatfield Hollow was designated as a state park in 1949. It was developed in the 1930s as a Civilian Conservation Corps recreation area within Cockaponset State Forest. The CCC created Schreeder Pond in 1934 by building a horseshoe-shaped earth and stone dam across Chatfield Hollow Brook. In 1937, Oak Lodge was raised on the west side of Schreeder Pond; the lodge was listed on the National Register of Historic Places in 1986. A "from the ground up" restoration of the lodge was completed in 2017.

The region where the park now resides was an important area for indigenous peoples. From the Paleo-Indian time approximately 10,00 years B.C. until the Final Woodland years which end in 1633, the area that Chatfield Hollow State Park occupies was important for fishing, plant gathering, and hunting to the River Indians of New England.[6] The Hammonasset people are recorded as being the first known inhabitants of this area. There are large granite rock overhangs where artifact discovery shows inhabitance long before the first English colonists settled in Chatfield Hollow. These rock overhangs are today known as the Indian Caves and can be visited by hiking a marked trail in the park. The three Chatfield brothers for whom the park is named arrived from England around the year 1639.[7]

== Geology ==
The park's bedrock ledges consist of a type of gneiss called Monson Gneiss, a medium- to coarse-grained rock, light in color, mainly composed of plagioclase, quartz and biotite; trace amounts of garnet, epidote, magnetite can be observed in places. The park sits in a glacial valley, with steep declines on either side and an abundance glacial erratics. The erratics are smooth with sharp edges removed; the majority are composed of Monson Gneiss. Examples of other rock types can be found in the park, since erratics can sometimes be moved great distances.

== Activities and amenities ==
Hiking

The 825-foot (251 m) Paul F. Wildermann Boardwalk allows visitors to cross an inland swamp without disturbing it. In addition, some 20 miles (32 km) of hiking trails, including the blue-blazed Chatfield Trail, originate within the park and extend into adjacent sections of forest.

Mountain biking

The park offers some of the most difficult technical cross-country mountain biking trails in the state. Among them are the Lookout Trail and the Pond Trail, which is a side trail that loops off the Deep Woods Trail.

Rock climbing

The park's ledges and cliffs include one of the most popular rock climbing routes in the state along the southern end of the Deep Woods Trail adjacent to Route 81.

Trout fishing

Chatfield Hollow State Park is one of Connecticut's 13 Trout Parks, with pond and stream stockings throughout the season and easy accessibility for young and novice anglers.

Other

The park offers swimming on Schreeder Pond and areas for picnicking.
