= Hailey Methodist Episcopal Church =

Historic church in Idaho, United States

- U.S. National Register of Historic Places
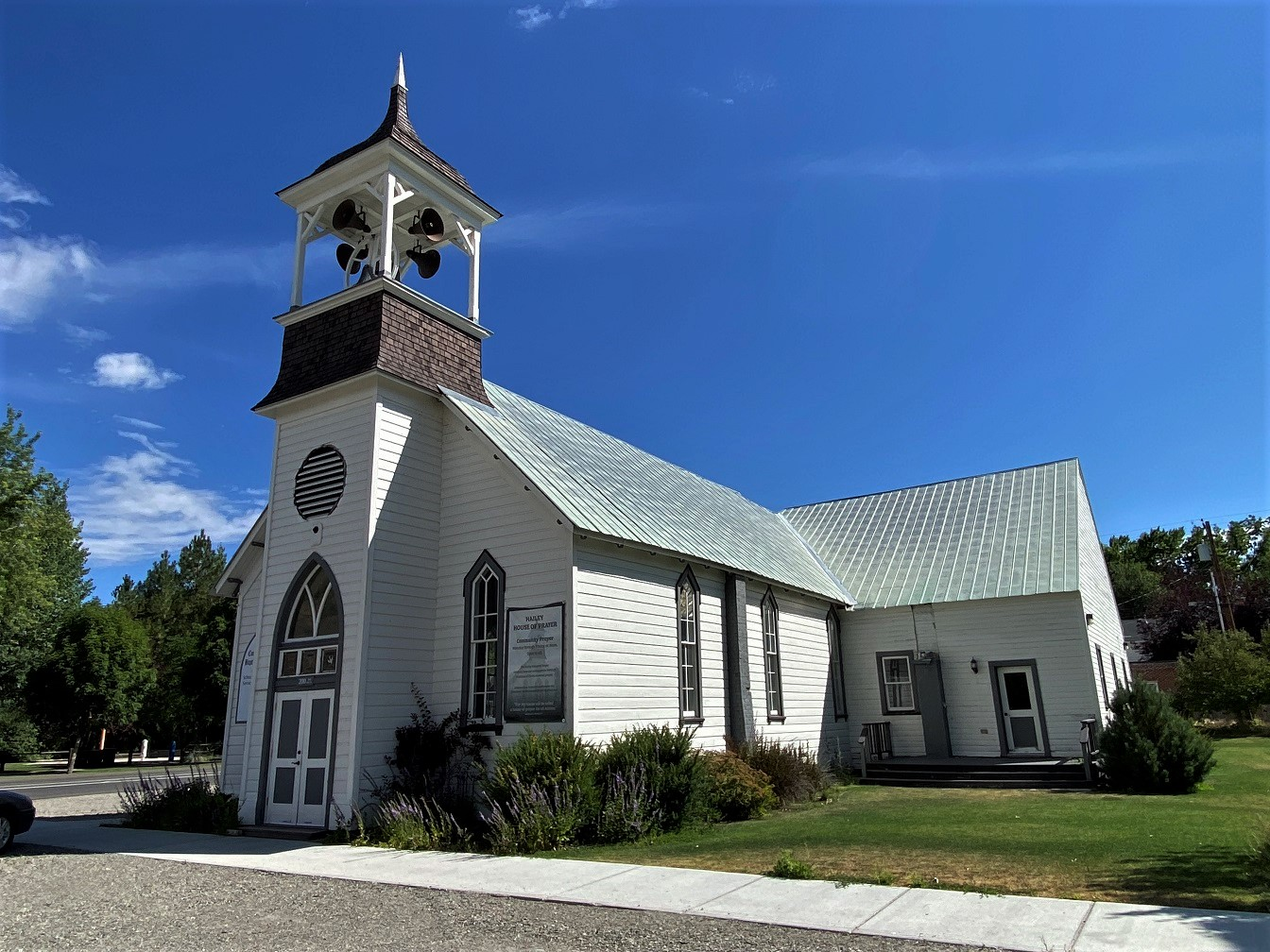
- Hailey Community Baptist Church in 2023

- Location within Idaho Location within the United States
- Location: 200 2nd Ave., S. Hailey, Idaho
- Coordinates: 43°31′11″N 114°18′43″W
- Architectural style: Vernacular Gothic Revival
- NRHP reference No.: 100000560
- Added to NRHP: January 24, 2017

The Hailey Methodist Episcopal Church, also known as Hailey Community Baptist Church, in Hailey, Idaho, was listed on the National Register of Historic Places in 2017.

It is a wood-frame vernacular Gothic Revival church that is 28.5 by 50.25 feet (8.69 m × 15.32 m) in plan. It has an entrance through its 8 by 11 feet (2.4 m × 3.4 m)-plan belfry tower inset into the building's gable front. Front extension of the roof is supported by purlins. An open-sided bell tower, holding a metal bell and four all-weather speakers, tops the tower.

It was built in 1886 and survived numerous fires in Hailey, probably due to relatively wide separation from its neighbors.

== See also ==
- Emmanuel Episcopal Church (Hailey, Idaho) (1885)
