= Emmanuel Episcopal Church (Rapid City, South Dakota) =

Historic church in South Dakota, United States

- U.S. National Register of Historic Places
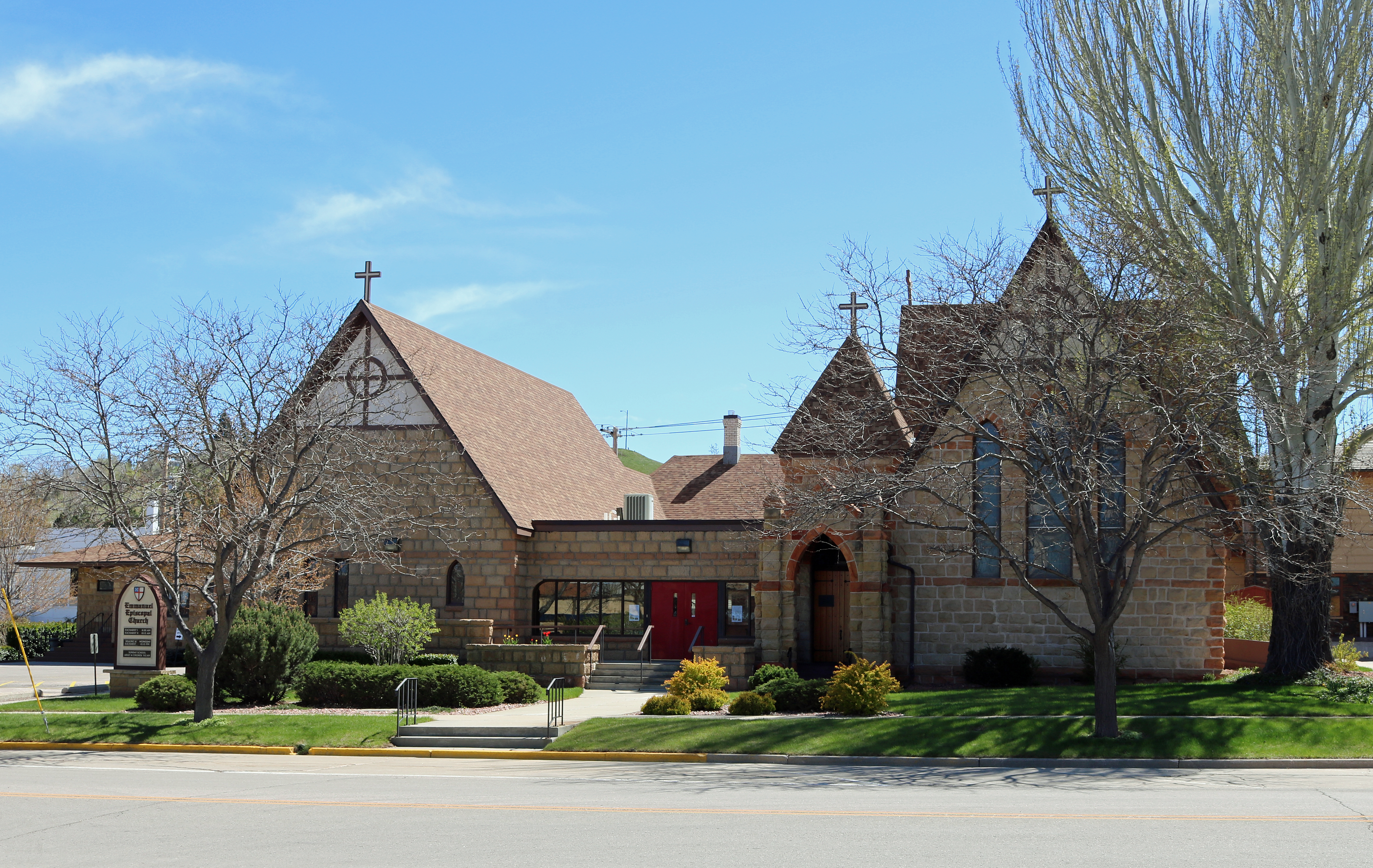
- The church in 2017

- Location within South Dakota Location within the United States
- Location: 717 Quincy St., Rapid City, South Dakota
- Coordinates: 44°4′41″N 103°13′50″W
- Area: 1 acre (0.40 ha)
- Built: 1887-88, 1934
- Architectural style: Gothic, High Victorian Gothic
- NRHP reference No.: 75001722
- Added to NRHP: May 29, 1975

The Emmanuel Episcopal Church in Rapid City, South Dakota is a historic Gothic Revival sandstone Episcopal church located at 717 Quincy Street. In 1975, Emmanuel Church was added to the National Register of Historic Places.

It was built during 1887–88. It is a one-story cross-gabled building.

The church reported 650 members in 2016 and 316 members in 2023; no membership statistics were reported nationally in 2024 parochial reports. Plate and pledge income reported for the congregation in 2024 was $397,799. Average Sunday attendance (ASA) in 2024 was 99 persons, down from a reported 166 in 2015.

== History ==
Emmanuel Episcopal Church is the only downtown Rapid City church still in its original building. A small group began holding services in Rapid City in 1887, under the leadership of George G. Ware, a lay reader who was later ordained and became the first rector. The cornerstone of the original sandstone church was laid November 10, 1887, and the first services were held in the new building in 1888.

The church is listed on the National Register of Historic Places. The original church building was enlarged by an addition to the south in the early 1940s, which also incorporated a stone Parish Hall adjacent on the east. In 1954, a large, new Parish Hall with a stage, kitchen and basement classrooms was added and, in 1991, an addition for office space and additional classrooms was completed.

The longest-serving Rector was the Rev. Mr. E. Jerome Pipes, who served from 1934 until 1960. Perhaps the best-remembered event of his tenure was the attendance of President Franklin D. Roosevelt at a regular Sunday service in 1936.

Rectors have included the Rev. Dr. Hanford L. King, Jr. (later Bishop of Idaho), 1960–1972; the Rev. Mr. Hewes "Doc" Phillips, 1972–1977; the Rev. Mr. David Anderson, 1978–1987; The Rev. Mr. David A. Cameron, 1987–2006; interim rectors the Very Rev. Dr. Robert Wagner (2006) and the Rev. Canon David L. Seger (2006-2008); the Rev. Richard Ressler, (2008–2013); the Rev. Chris Roussell (2013–2019); and the Rev. John David Barnes (2020–present).

== Current use ==
Emmanuel Church is an active parish in the Episcopal Diocese of South Dakota.

== See also ==
- List of Registered Historic Places in South Dakota
- Emmanuel Episcopal Church (disambiguation)
