= Emmanuel Lutheran Church (Dakota City, Nebraska) =

Historic church in Nebraska, United States

- U.S. National Register of Historic Places
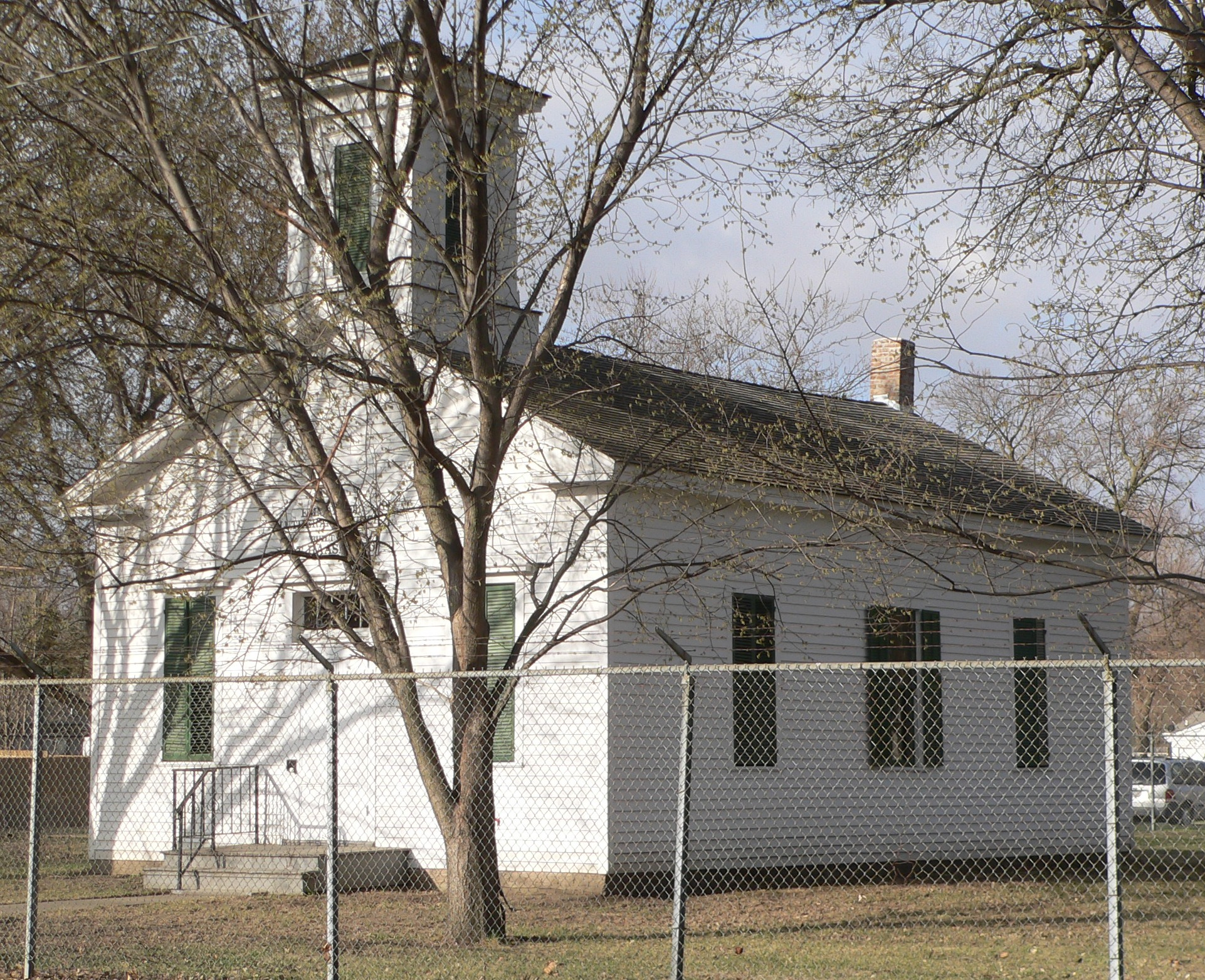
- View from the northeast

- Location within Nebraska Location within the United States
- Location: 1500 Hickory St., Dakota City, Nebraska
- Coordinates: 42.41255°N 96.41767°W
- Built: 1860
- Architectural style: Greek Revival
- NRHP reference No.: 69000129
- Added to NRHP: October 15, 1969

Emmanuel Lutheran Church in Dakota City, Nebraska, United States, is a Greek Revival church designed and built by Augustus T. Haase in 1860. It is believed to be the first Lutheran church built in Nebraska and is certainly the oldest Lutheran Church structure still standing in Nebraska.

It was listed on the National Register of Historic Places in 1969.
