= Immanuel Evangelical Lutheran Church (Pilot Knob, Missouri) =

Historic church in Missouri, United States

- U.S. National Register of Historic Places
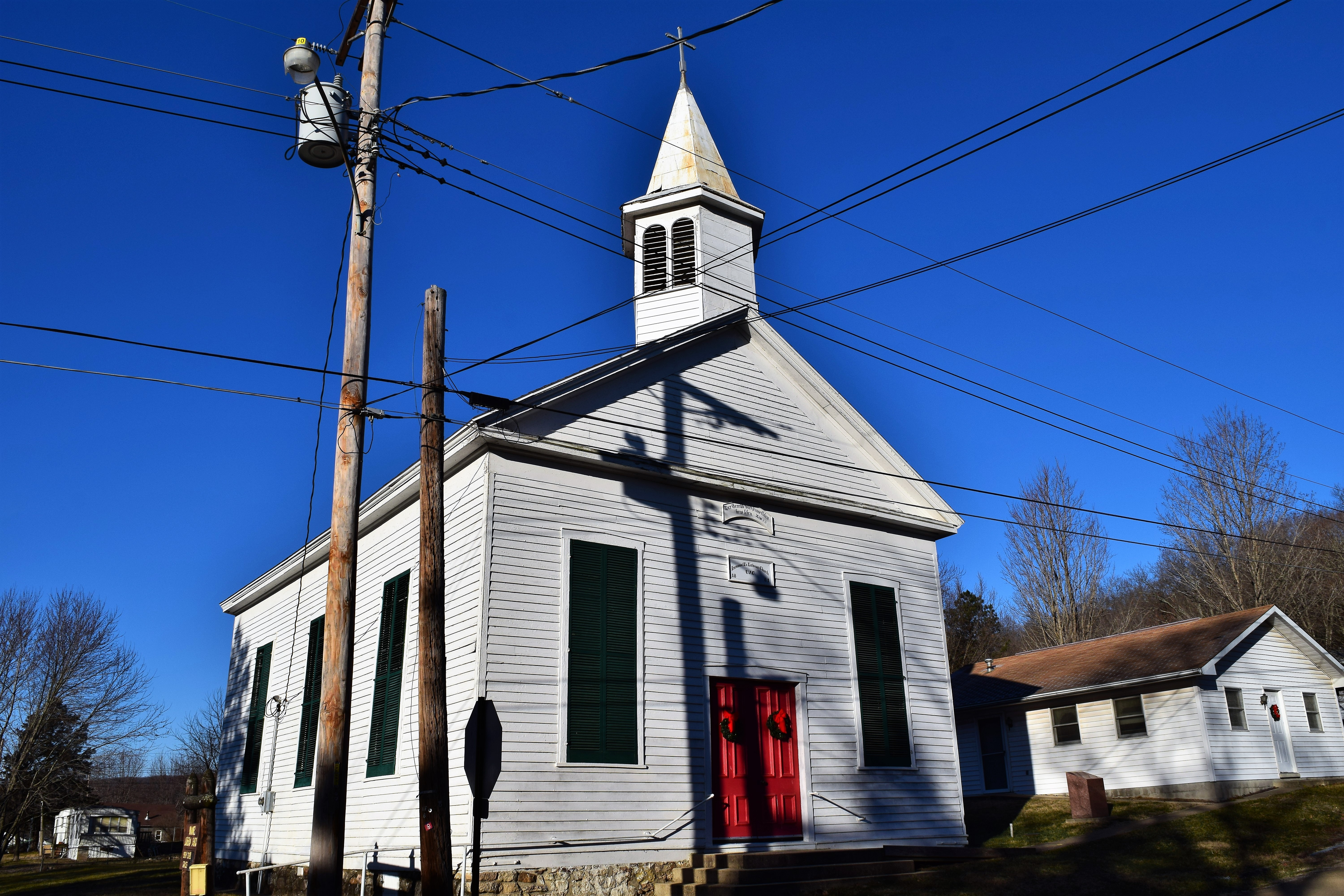

- Location within Missouri Location within the United States
- Location: E Pine and N Ziegler St., Pilot Knob, Missouri
- Coordinates: 37°37′34″N 90°38′29″W
- Area: 0.3 acres (0.12 ha)
- Built: 1861
- Built by: Gockel, August
- NRHP reference No.: 79001364
- Added to NRHP: January 22, 1979

Immanuel Evangelical Lutheran Church is a historic Evangelical Lutheran church located at E Pine and N Ziegler Street in Pilot Knob, Iron County, Missouri. It was built in 1861, and is a simple, rectangular, frame building. It measures 30 feet, 7 inches, by 45 feet, 7 inches. It is sheathed in clapboard and has a gable roof topped by a hexagonal cupola with a steep, pyramidal roof and apron.

It was listed on the National Register of Historic Places in 1979.
