= Emmanuel Church of the Evangelical Association of Binghamton =

Historic church in New York, United States

- U.S. National Register of Historic Places
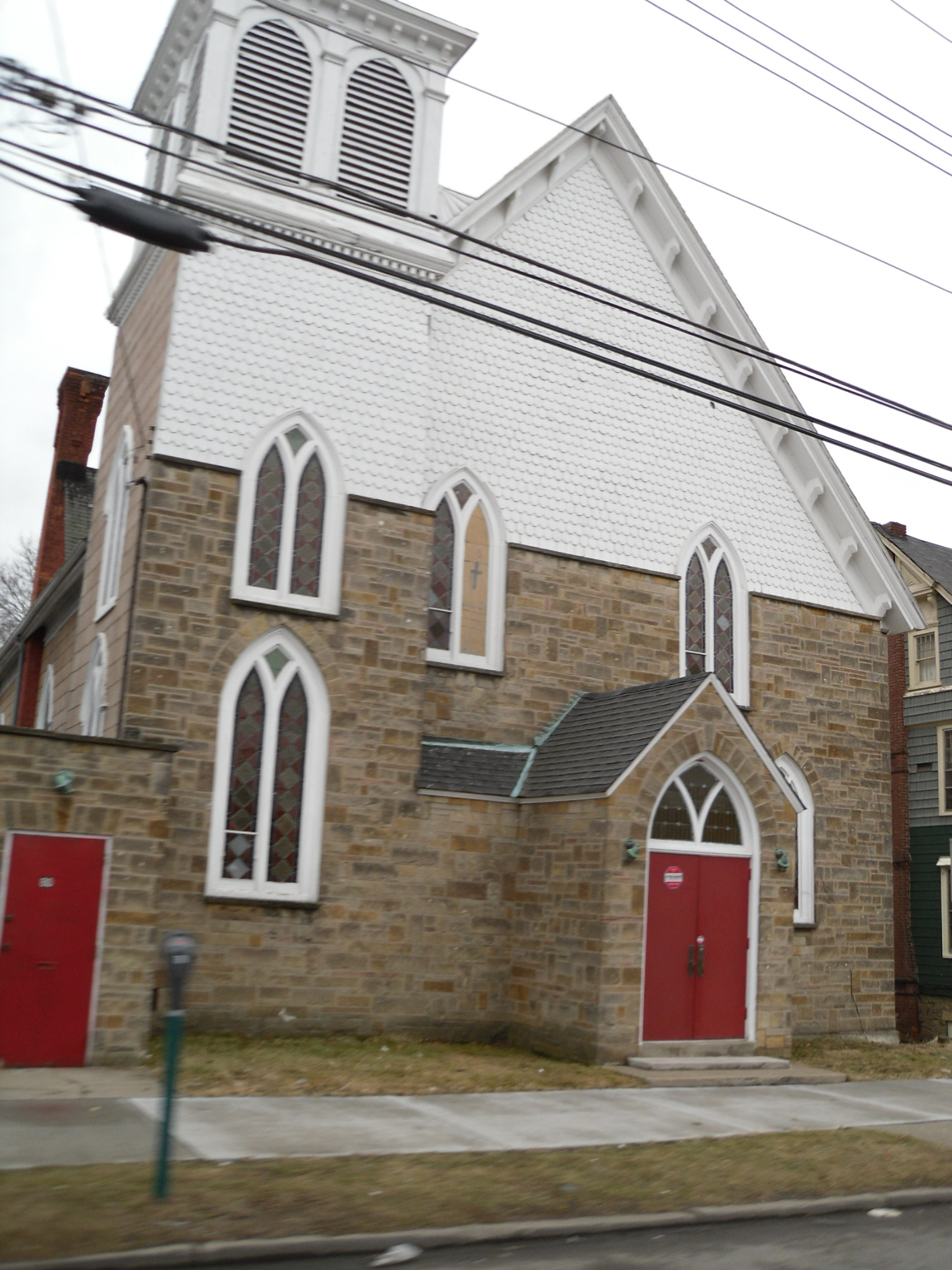
- Emmanuel Church of the Evangelical Association of Binghamton, March 2010

- Location within New York Location within the United States
- Location: 80 Front St., Binghamton, New York
- Coordinates: 42°5′44.64″N 75°55′6.67″W
- Area: 1.4 acres (0.57 ha)
- Built: 1884
- Architectural style: Late Victorian
- NRHP reference No.: 09000941
- Added to NRHP: November 20, 2009

Emmanuel Church of the Evangelical Association of Binghamton, now Our Free Will Baptist Church, is a historic Evangelical church located at Binghamton in Broome County, New York. It was built in 1884 and is a large rectangular, wood-frame building, three bays wide and seven bays deep, on a stone foundation. It is two stories tall on the front elevation and, because of a steep drop off, four stories on the remaining sides. It features a steep gable roof and engaged bell tower. The variegated random ashlar stone siding was added about 1952, when a rear addition was completed.

It was listed on the National Register of Historic Places in 2009.
