= Emmanuel Episcopal Church (Hailey, Idaho) =

Historic church in Idaho, United States

- U.S. National Register of Historic Places
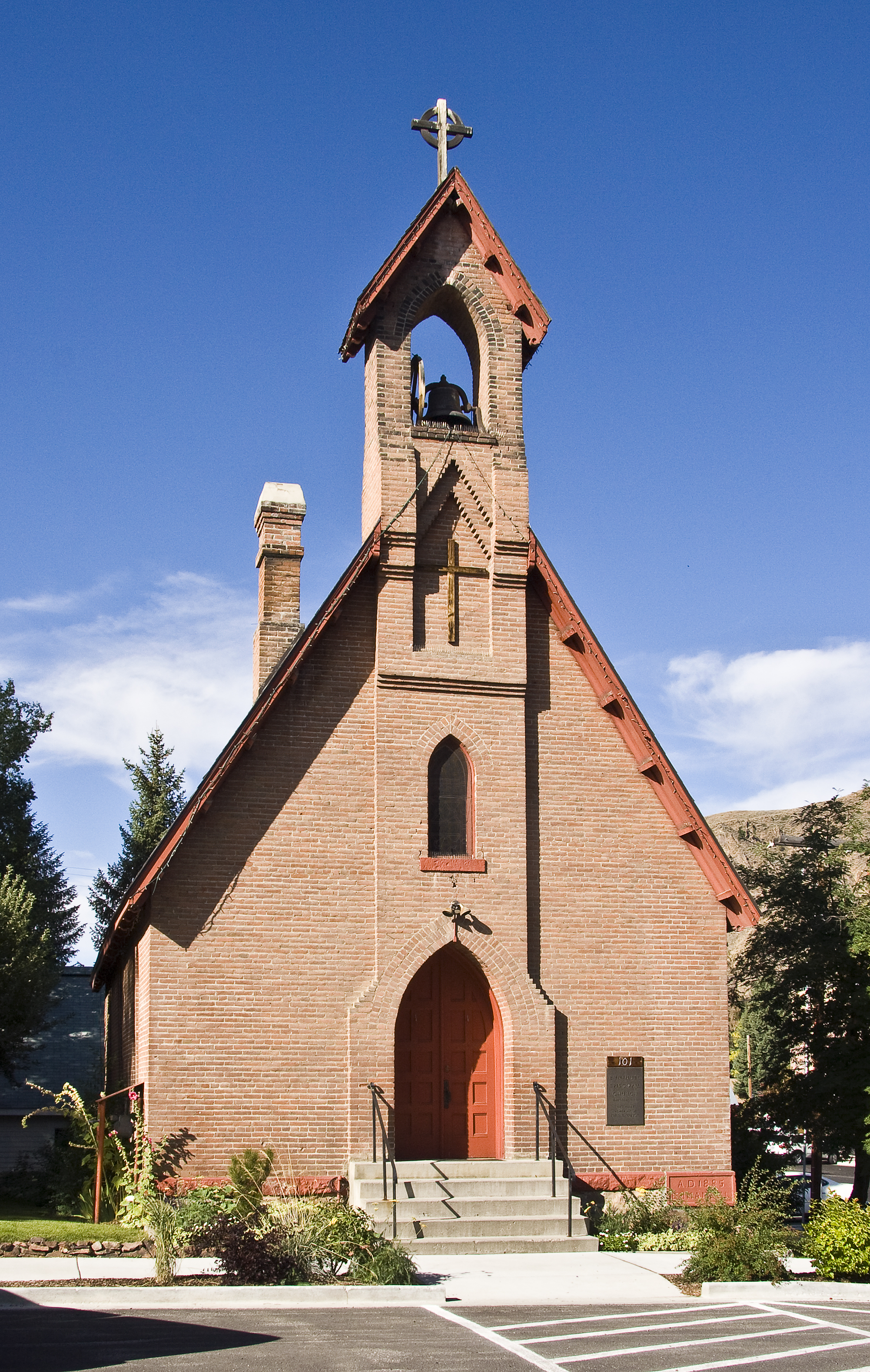

- Location within Idaho Location within the United States
- Location: 101 2nd Ave., S., Hailey, Idaho
- Coordinates: 43°31′13″N 114°18′44″W
- Area: less than one acre
- Built: 1885
- Architect: Castro, J.M.B.
- Architectural style: Gothic Revival
- NRHP reference No.: 77000457
- Added to NRHP: October 5, 1977

Emmanuel Episcopal Church is a historic Episcopal 101 2nd Avenue, South Hailey, Idaho. It was started in 1885 and was added to the National Register in 1977.

== See also ==
- Hailey Methodist Episcopal Church, also National Register-listed
