= Immanuel Lutheran Church (Houston) =

Historic church in Texas, United States

- U.S. National Register of Historic Places
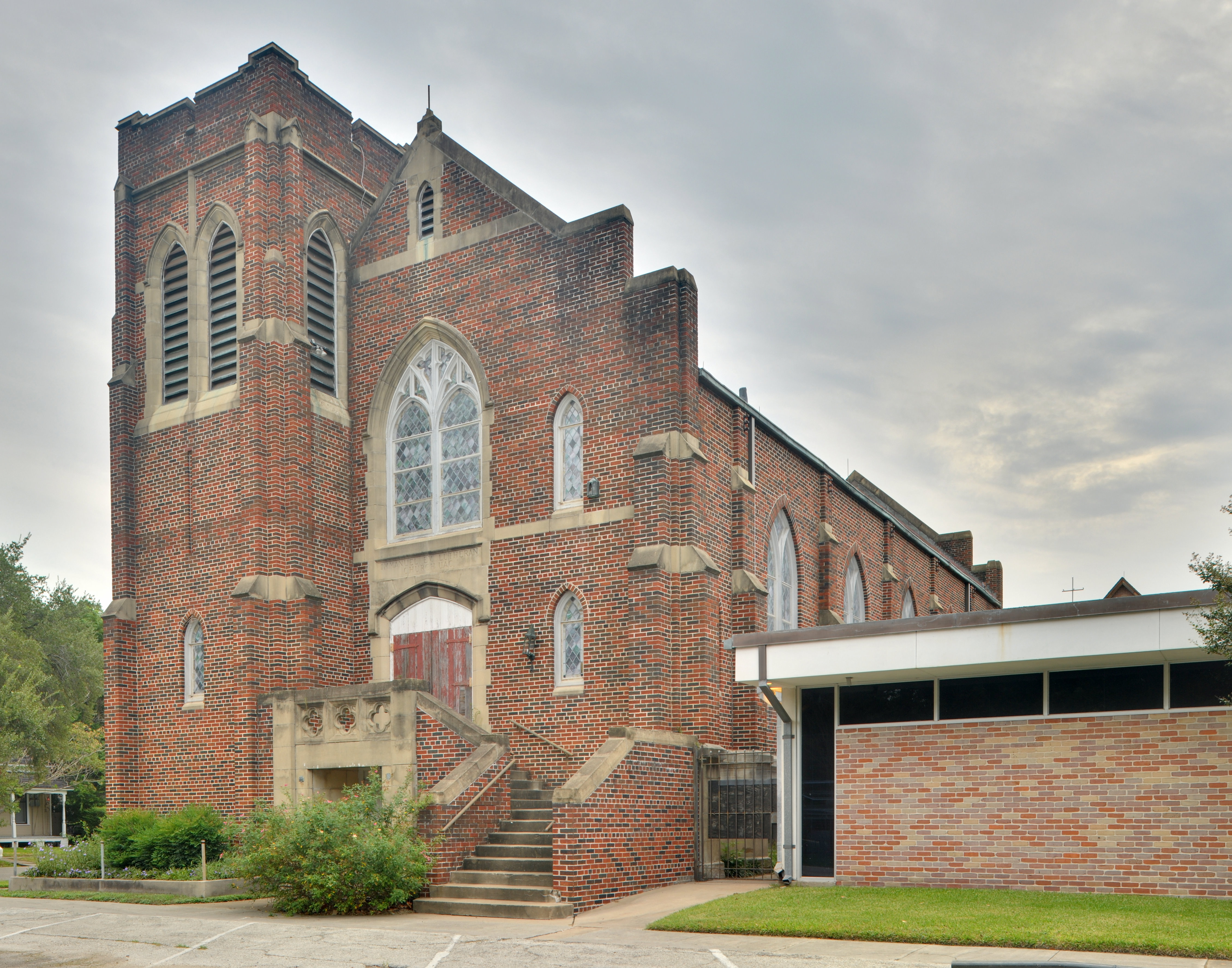

- Location within Texas Location within the United States
- Location: 1448 Cortlandt St., Houston, Texas
- Coordinates: 29°47′52″N 95°23′42″W
- Area: less than one acre
- Built: 1932
- Architectural style: Late Gothic Revival
- MPS: Houston Heights MRA
- NRHP reference No.: 83004464
- Added to NRHP: June 22, 1983

Immanuel Lutheran Church is a historic church at 1448 Cortlandt Street in Houston, Texas.

It was built in 1932 and added to the National Register of Historic Places in 1983.
