= Emmanuel Episcopal Church (Alexandria, Virginia) =

Coordinates: 38°49′13.5″N 77°4′0.5″W

Emmanuel Church Alexandria
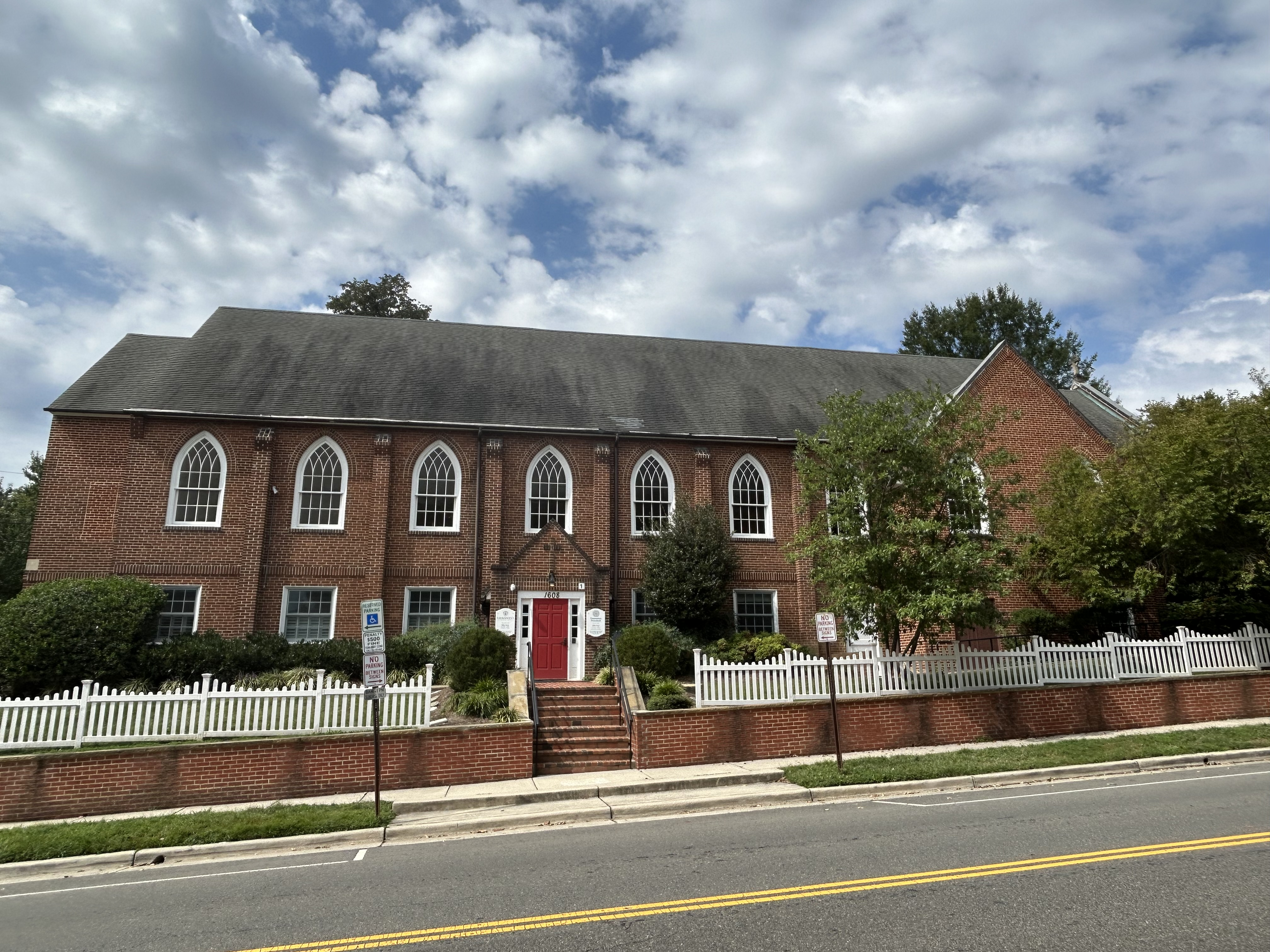
- Emmanuel Episcopal Church in 2025
- Emmanuel Church Alexandria
- Location: 1608 Russell Road; Alexandria, Virginia
- Country: United States
- Denomination: Episcopal
- Website: http://www.emmanuelonhigh.org/

History
- Founded: 1910

Architecture
- Style: Gothic Revival
- Years built: 1910

Administration
- Diocese: Episcopal Diocese of Virginia
- Parish: Emmanuel Church Alexandria

Clergy
- Rector: The Very Reverend Charles C. McCoart, Jr.

Emmanuel Episcopal Church is an Episcopal Church in Alexandria, Virginia in the city's North Ridge neighborhood. Emmanuel Church is a parish in the Episcopal Diocese of Virginia.

== History ==
In 1908, G.P. Christian and J. H. Gibbony, two students at the Virginia Theological Seminary, organized a Sunday School for children in what was known as the Braddock Heights area of Alexandria.

In 1910, a chapel was built as the Braddock Heights Episcopal Mission. During the 1911 Christmas holidays, the two seminarians serving at the mission decided to name the church "Emmanuel" after the Virginia Theological Seminary Chapel. In 1922, Emmanuel Episcopal Church acquired independent status with the Rev. Samuel A. Wallis.

In 1944, the then Rector of Emmanuel, the Rev. Edward Tate, founded the Episcopal School, St. Stephen’s School for Boys. Tate resigned from Emmanuel in 1945 to become headmaster. Throughout its history, Emmanuel has maintained a close relationship with both the Virginia Theological Seminary, as well as St. Stephen's (now known as St. Stephen’s & St. Agnes).

In 1968, Emmanuel established the Emmanuel Episcopal Preschool. Emmanuel's Preschool is located within Emmanuel and serves children aged two through five years old.

In 2002, under the leadership of the Rev. Daniel W. Eckman, Jr., Emmanuel underwent an extensive $2 million building renovation of the entire complex including the sacristy, the memorial room, the parish hall and Emmanuel Preschool.

== Current practice ==
Today, the parish proclaims itself to be committed to worship and preaching, ministry to children, and outreach to the community and the world. Emmanuel Church has an active service ministry with many local outreach activities focused on feeding, education, housing, and welcoming refugee families. The church also maintains a strong connection to its partner parish, Sainte Croix in the Episcopal Diocese of Haiti located in Léogâne, Haiti.

== Architecture ==
The current church building was constructed in 1910 in Gothic Revival style. The most significant element inside the sanctuary is the cross-beam, or scissor truss, timber ceiling.
