= Immanuel Church, Jönköping =

Coordinates: 57.7807°N 14.1588°E

Immanuel Church
- Immanuelskyrkan
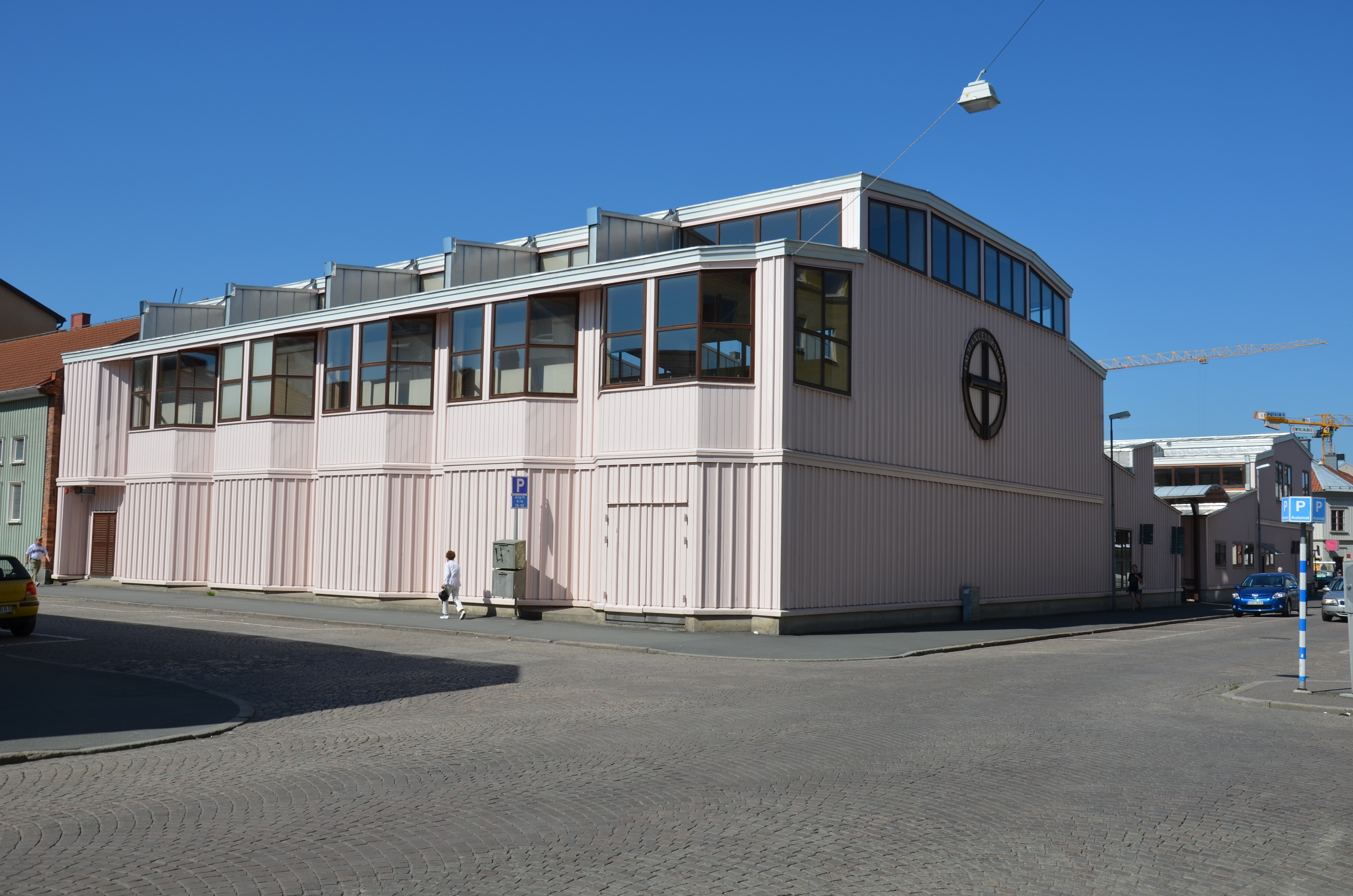
- The Immanuel Church in late May 2012
- Immanuel Church
- Location: Jönköping
- Country: Sweden
- Denomination: Uniting Church in Sweden
- Previous denomination: Mission Covenant Church of Sweden

History
- Consecrated: 1976

The Immanuel Church (Swedish: Immanuelskyrkan) is a church building at Oxtorgsgatan in Jönköping, Sweden. Belonging to the Uniting Church in Sweden, it was built in 1975 and opened in 1976.
