= Parmelee House (Killingworth, Connecticut) =

Historic house in Connecticut, United States

- U.S. National Register of Historic Places
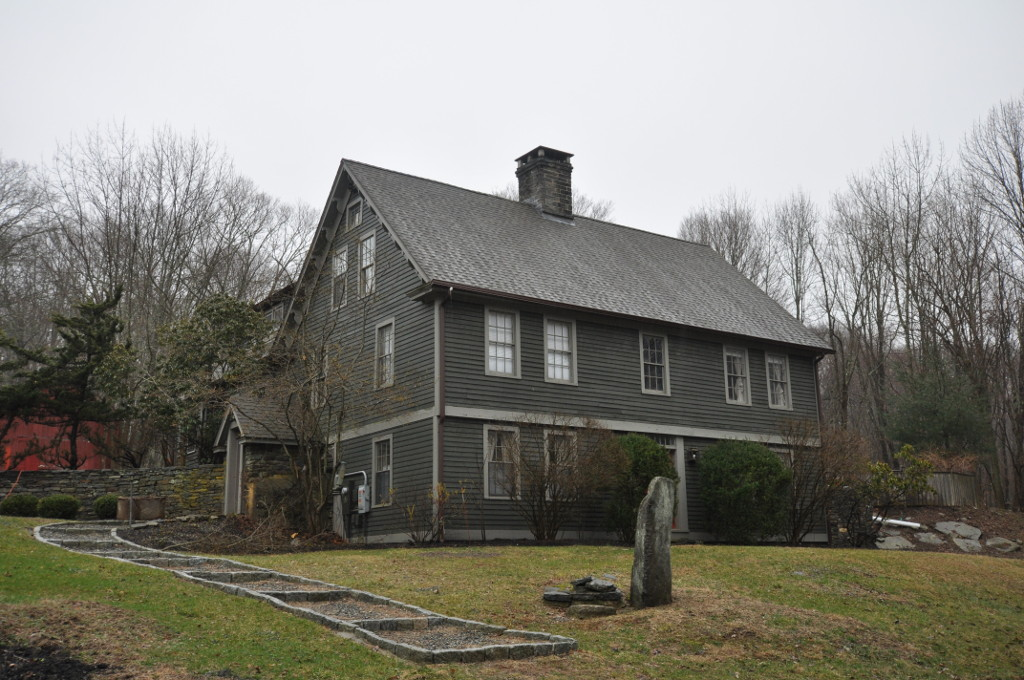

- Location within Connecticut Location within the United States
- Location: 4 Beckwith Road, Killingworth, Connecticut
- Coordinates: 41°23′3″N 72°35′13″W
- Area: 6 acres (2.4 ha)
- Built: c. 1770
- Architectural style: Colonial
- NRHP reference No.: 07000417
- Added to NRHP: May 15, 2007

The Parmelee House is a historic house at 4 Beckwith Road in Killingworth, Connecticut. It was built about 1770 for a member of one of the area's founding families, and is architecturally important as an example of a farm outbuilding converted to a residence during the 18th century. It was listed on the National Register of Historic Places in 2007.

== Description and history ==
The Parmelee House is located in a rural setting of western Killingworth, facing west on the east side of Beckwith Road, a short way south of Connecticut Route 148. It is a 2 1/2-story wood-frame structure, five bays wide, with a side-gable roof and a central chimney. Because it is set in a hill, it only has a single-story at the rear. Although it has a conventional colonial appearance, the house is architecturally distinctive for the period, with an atypical floor plan that is partly a consequence of using what would normally be the basement as a living space.

The house was apparently built c. 1770 by Ezra Parmelee, descended from one of the area's first colonial settlers. The building's structure suggests that it may have been built originally as a three-bay bank barn; the fireplace styles are suggestive of post-Revolutionary War construction, indicating the conversion took place in the late 1780s. There is no mention of a house on the property in a sale recorded in 1770, but a house is present in 1787. The property remained in the hands of Parmelee descendants for most of the years between then and 1928. The property also includes a c. 1880 barn.

== See also ==
- National Register of Historic Places listings in Middlesex County, Connecticut
