= Emmanuel Lutheran Church (R M Lumsden, Saskatchewan) =

- Location: Lumsden No. 189, Saskatchewan, Saskatchewan
- Country: Canada
- Denomination: Lutheran Church–Canada

History
- Founded: 1916

Architecture
- Functional status: Non-Active
- Architectural type: Gothic Revival style

Emmanuel Lutheran Church is a designated municipal heritage property in the Rural Municipality of Lumsden No. 189, Saskatchewan, Canada, 16 km (9.9 mi) north of the town of Craven. Originally built in 1916 to meet the religious needs of local Lutheran settlers in the area this church acted as model for other rural Lutheran churches to be built in Canada. In 1971 the building was sold to the Church of Jesus Christ of Latter-day Saints (LDS Church). The building was later purchased by the Rural Municipality and restored back to the original design used when it was a Lutheran church, including reinstalling the spire. The building is no longer used for regular religious service but for special events.
