= Immanuel Lutheran Church (Red Wing, Minnesota) =

Historic church in Minnesota, United States

- U.S. National Register of Historic Places
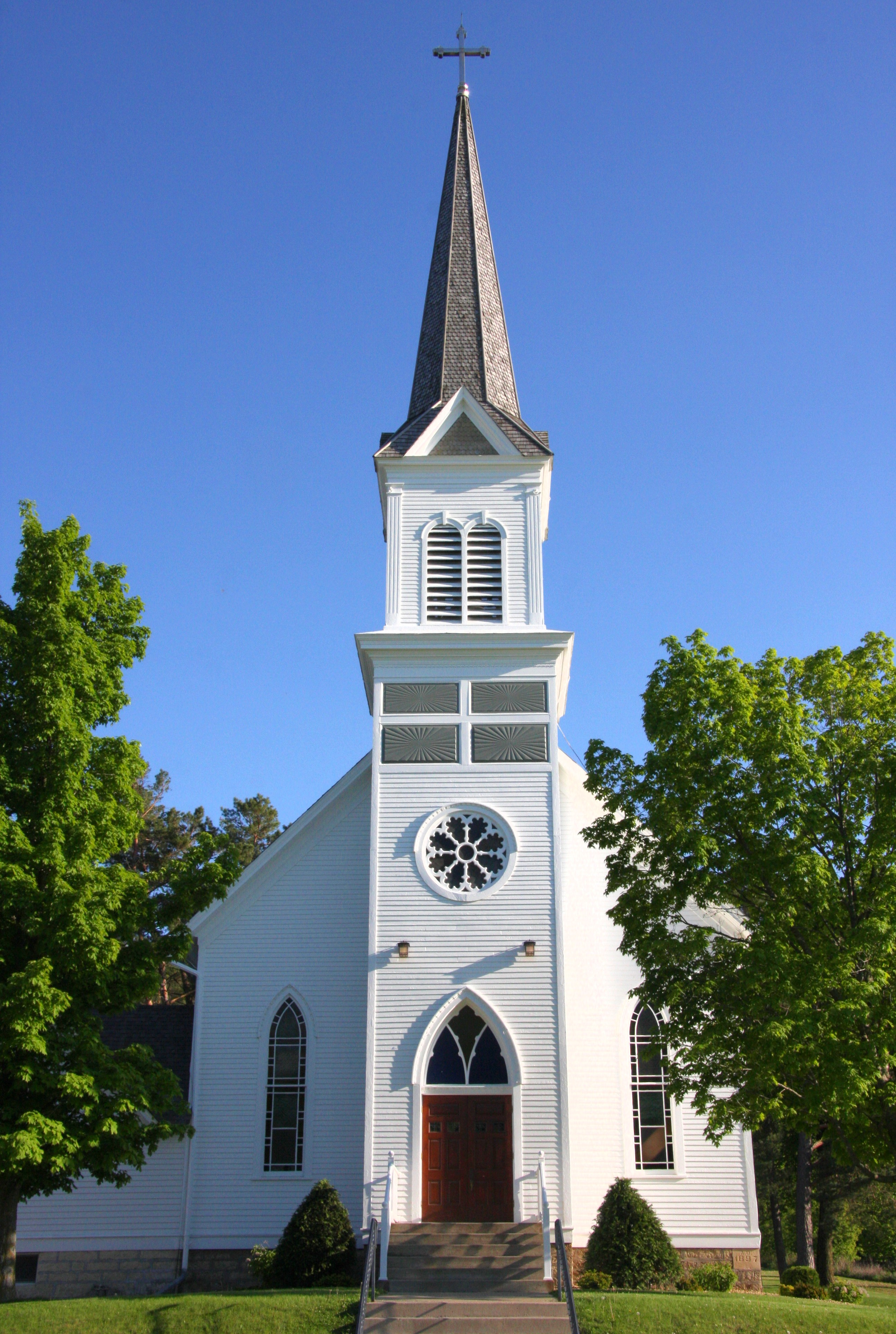
- Immanuel Lutheran Church in 2016

- Location within Minnesota Location within the United States
- Nearest city: Red Wing, Minnesota
- Coordinates: 44°29′30″N 92°32′11″W
- Area: less than one acre
- Built: 1897
- Architect: Peter Tubesing
- Architectural style: Gothic Revival
- MPS: Rural Goodhue County MRA
- NRHP reference No.: 80002061
- Added to NRHP: February 12, 1980

Immanuel Lutheran Church is a historic church in Hay Creek Township, Goodhue County, Minnesota, Goodhue County, Minnesota, United States, near the city of Red Wing. The congregation was organized in 1858 by German Lutheran families who had settled in Flower Valley. Their first pastor, William Wier, came to administer the sacrament twice a year through the summer of 1861. The first church building was a three-room building completed around 1862. A number of German Lutherans in the southern part of the township wanted to join the Immanuel congregation, so the congregation established a northern district and a southern district. This arrangement continued for a while until the building in Flower Valley was moved to the current location in Hay Creek in 1868. The land in Hay Creek consisted of two acres donated by a Mr. W. Plote.

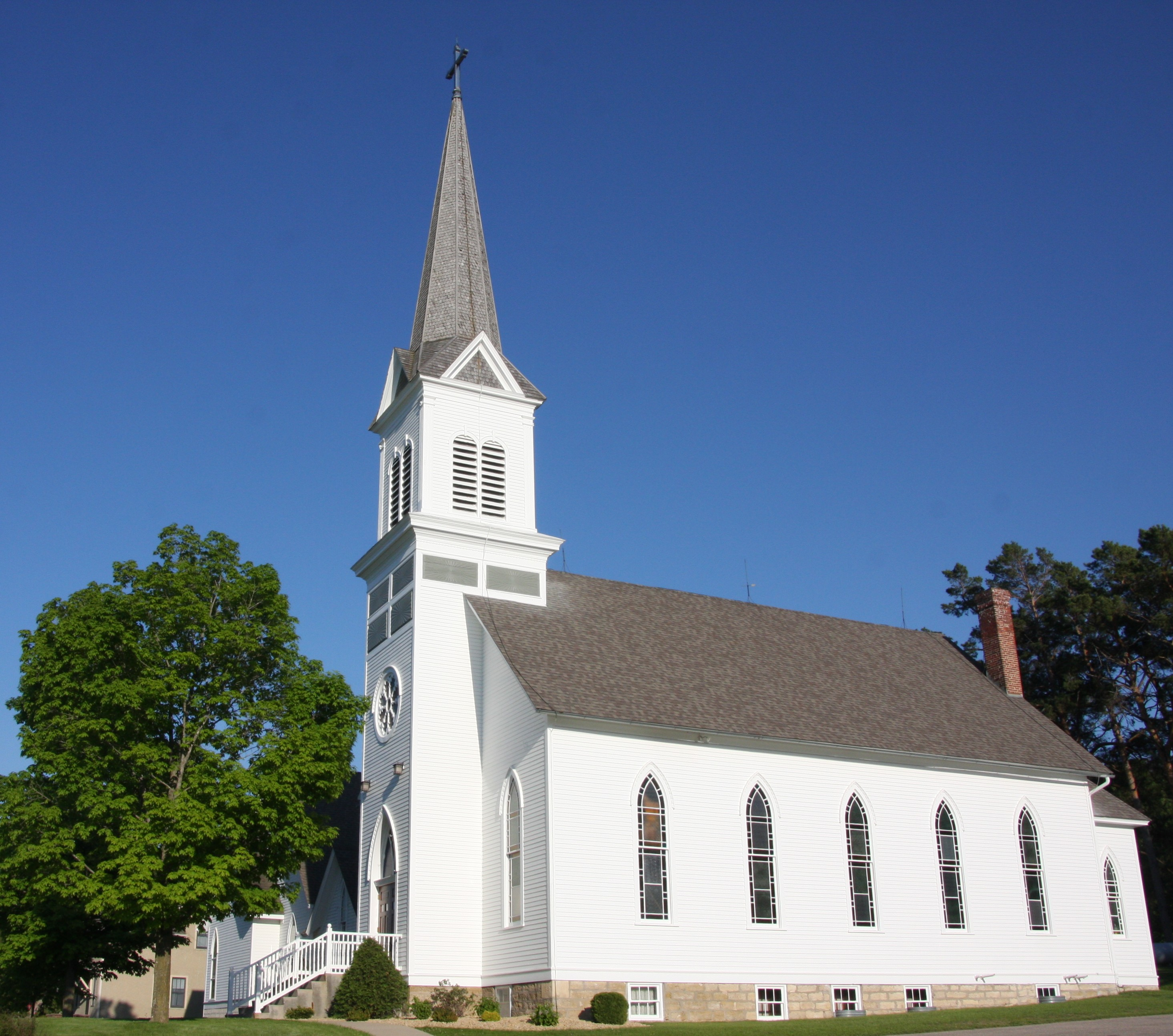
The church seen from the northwest in 2016

The congregation grew steadily through the 1870s and 1880s. In 1893, the congregation began discussing whether they should build a new church or repair the existing structure. On February 23, 1897, the members voted to build a new church. Peter Tubesing of Red Wing proposed a floor plan, and the members initially decided to build a brick church with a cost not exceeding $4000. The voting members of the congregation later decided on April 1 to build a wood-frame church, after reviewing the costs of construction. They also decided to build the church with a balcony, an alcove room next to the altar, colored glass in the windows, and with a furnace for heating. The foundation wall was started on April 20, and the cornerstone was laid on May 16. The cornerstone ceremony attracted nearly 600 people from Goodhue, Belvidere, Frontenac, and Red Wing. The church was dedicated on November 7, 1897, with nearly 1000 visitors attending.

It was listed on the National Register of Historic Places in 1980 as a symbol of regional German American settlement, Southeast Minnesota's third-largest immigrant group after Swedes and Norwegians.

The church is part of the Lutheran Church–Missouri Synod.
