= Dakota City, Nebraska =

City in Dakota County, Nebraska, United States

- City
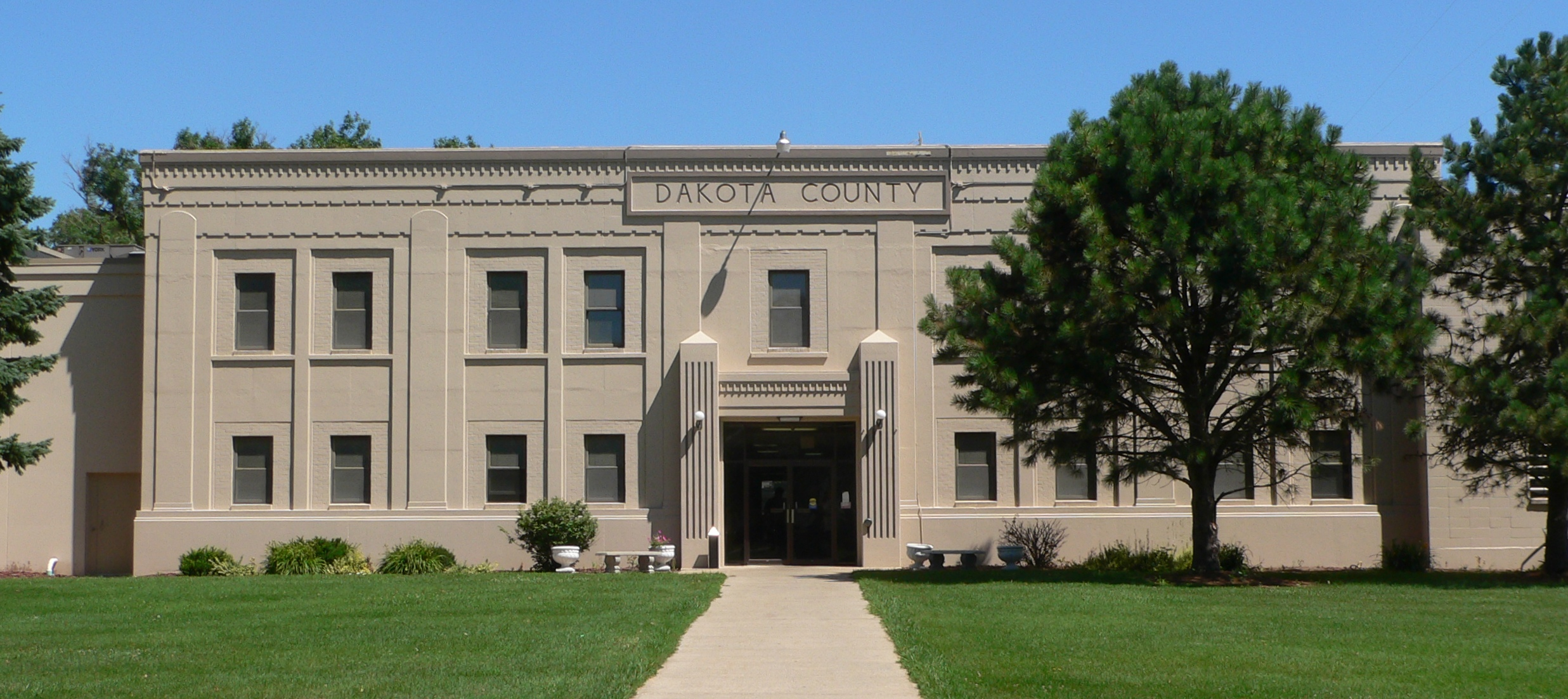
- Dakota County Courthouse in Dakota City, July 2010

- Location of Dakota City, Nebraska
- Coordinates: 42°25′07″N 96°25′13″W
- Country: United States
- State: Nebraska
- County: Dakota

Area
  - Total: 1.56 sq mi (4.04 km^{2})
  - Land: 1.44 sq mi (3.73 km^{2})
  - Water: 0.12 sq mi (0.31 km^{2})
- Elevation: 1,099 ft (335 m)

Population (2020)
  - Total: 2,081
  - Density: 1,444.7/sq mi (557.82/km^{2})
- Time zone: UTC-6 (Central (CST))
  - Summer (DST): UTC-5 (CDT)
- ZIP code: 68731
- Area code: 402
- FIPS code: 31-12000
- GNIS feature ID: 2393706
- Website: dakotacity.net

Dakota City is a city in and the county seat of Dakota County, Nebraska, United States. The population was 2,081 at the 2020 census. Tyson Foods' largest beef production plant is located in Dakota City.

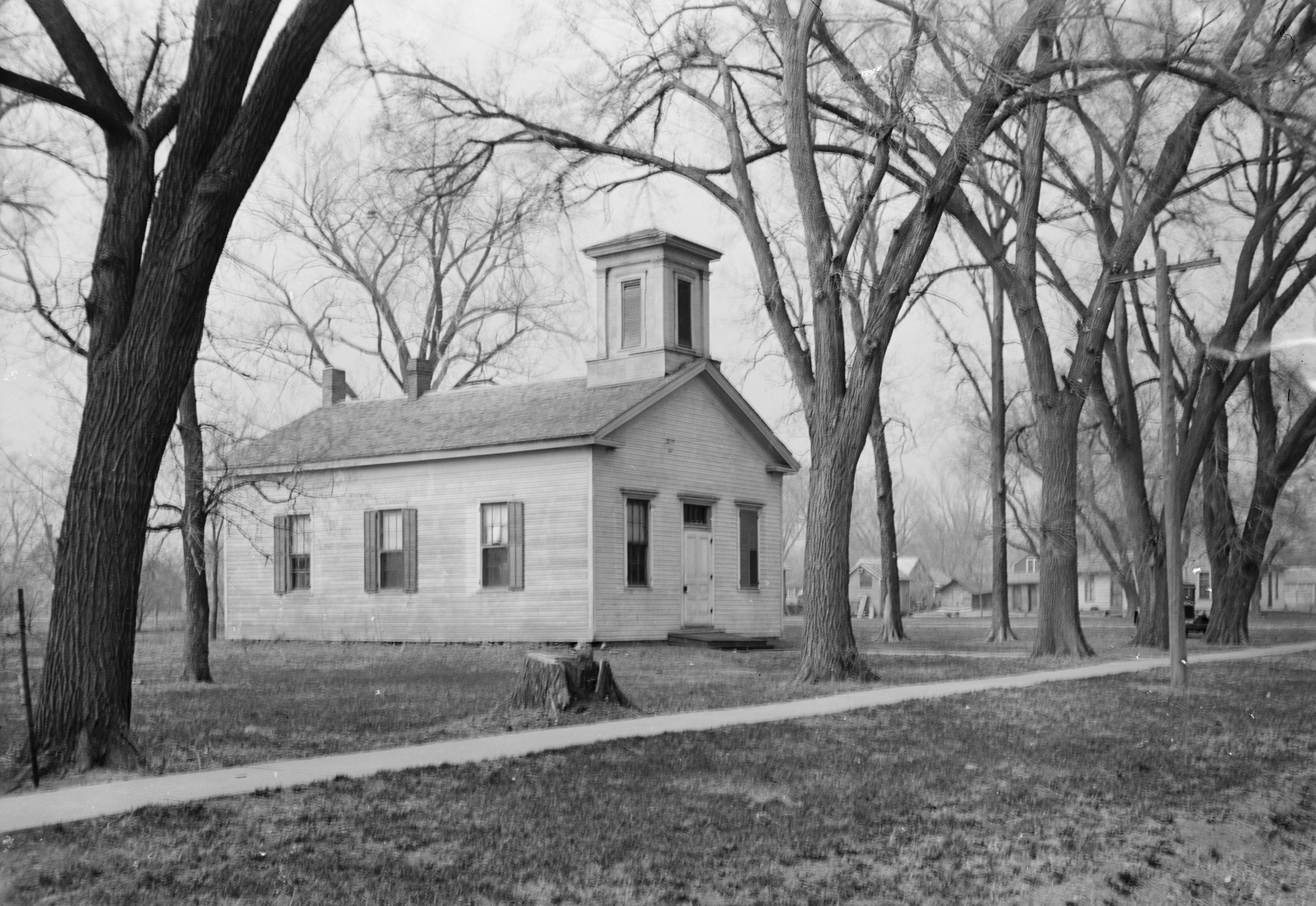
Emmanuel Lutheran Church was the first Lutheran church constructed in Nebraska. It is listed in the National Register of Historic Places.

== History ==
Dakota City was platted in 1856. It was named for the Dakota people. Dakota City was incorporated as a city in 1858.

Emmanuel Lutheran Church in Dakota City is listed on the National Register of Historic Places.

On May 1, 2020, 669 workers at the local Tyson Foods meat packaging plant were infected with COVID-19 which resulted in the closure of the plant until May 4 for the sanitation to take place.

== Geography ==
According to the United States Census Bureau, the city has a total area of 1.20 square miles (3.11 km^{2}), of which 1.08 square miles (2.80 km^{2}) is land and 0.12 square miles (0.31 km^{2}) is water.

== Demographics ==
Historical population
Census	Pop.	Note	%±
1860	58		—
1870	300		417.2%
1880	364		21.3%
1900	521		—
1910	474		−9.0%
1920	399		−15.8%
1930	417		4.5%
1940	477		14.4%
1950	622		30.4%
1960	928		49.2%
1970	1,057		13.9%
1980	1,440		36.2%
1990	1,470		2.1%
2000	1,821		23.9%
2010	1,919		5.4%
2020	2,081		8.4%
U.S. Decennial Census; 2013 Estimate

Dakota City is part of the Sioux City metropolitan area.

=== 2020 census ===
As of the 2020 census, Dakota City had a population of 2,081. The median age was 35.1 years. 27.3% of residents were under the age of 18 and 13.2% of residents were 65 years of age or older. For every 100 females there were 115.0 males, and for every 100 females age 18 and over there were 115.8 males age 18 and over.

99.5% of residents lived in urban areas, while 0.5% lived in rural areas.

There were 661 households in Dakota City, of which 36.6% had children under the age of 18 living in them. Of all households, 55.2% were married-couple households, 20.9% were households with a male householder and no spouse or partner present, and 16.2% were households with a female householder and no spouse or partner present. About 22.1% of all households were made up of individuals and 8.8% had someone living alone who was 65 years of age or older.

There were 678 housing units, of which 2.5% were vacant. The homeowner vacancy rate was 0.4% and the rental vacancy rate was 1.9%.

Racial composition as of the 2020 census
Race	Number	Percent
White	1,200	57.7%
Hispanic or Latino (of any race)	794	38.2%
Some other race	384	18.5%
Two or more races	295	14.2%
American Indian and Alaska Native	74	3.6%
Asian	100	4.8%
Black or African American	20	1.0%
Native Hawaiian and Other Pacific Islander	8	0.4%

=== 2010 census ===
As of the census of 2010, there were 1,919 people, 637 households, and 464 families residing in the city. The population density was 1,776.9 inhabitants per square mile (686.1/km^{2}). There were 657 housing units at an average density of 608.3 per square mile (234.9/km^{2}). The racial makeup of the city was 82.4% White, 0.8% African American, 1.9% Native American, 4.5% Asian, 8.3% from other races, and 2.1% from two or more races. Hispanic or Latino of any race were 29.3% of the population.

There were 637 households, of which 41.0% had children under the age of 18 living with them, 55.9% were married couples living together, 11.8% had a female householder with no husband present, 5.2% had a male householder with no wife present, and 27.2% were non-families. 20.4% of all households were made up of individuals, and 6% had someone living alone who was 65 years of age or older. The average household size was 2.90 and the average family size was 3.37.

The median age in the city was 34.6 years. 29.3% of residents were under the age of 18; 7.9% were between the ages of 18 and 24; 28.9% were from 25 to 44; 24.2% were from 45 to 64; and 9.8% were 65 years of age or older. The gender makeup of the city was 51.1% male and 48.9% female.

=== 2000 census ===
As of the census of 2000, there were 1,821 people, 596 households, and 448 families residing in the city. The population density was 1,728.7 inhabitants per square mile (667.5/km^{2}). There were 627 housing units at an average density of 595.2 per square mile (229.8/km^{2}). The racial makeup of the city was 84.62% White, 0.77% African American, 1.81% Native American, 1.92% Asian, 9.28% from other races, and 1.59% from two or more races. Hispanic or Latino of any race were 20.21% of the population.

There were 596 households, out of which 42.6% had children under the age of 18 living with them, 60.7% were married couples living together, 10.7% had a female householder with no husband present, and 24.8% were non-families. 18.8% of all households were made up of individuals, and 5.7% had someone living alone who was 65 years of age or older. The average household size was 2.99 and the average family size was 3.38.

In the city, the population was spread out, with 31.1% under the age of 18, 9.5% from 18 to 24, 31.1% from 25 to 44, 20.4% from 45 to 64, and 7.9% who were 65 years of age or older. The median age was 31 years. For every 100 females, there were 104.6 males. For every 100 females age 18 and over, there were 106.8 males.

As of 2000, the median income for a household in the city was $43,438, and the median income for a family was $45,987. Males had a median income of $30,612 versus $24,150 for females. The per capita income for the city was $16,923. About 7.0% of families and 8.1% of the population were below the poverty line, including 10.7% of those under age 18 and 7.2% of those age 65 or over.

== Notable people ==
- Ralph F. Beermann - Member of the United States House of Representatives from Nebraska
- James Young Deer - Silent-era Native American director and actor.

== See also ==
- List of municipalities in Nebraska
- Impact of the 2019–20 coronavirus pandemic on the meat industry in the United States
