= Emmanuel Baptist Church =

Emmanuel Baptist Church may refer to:

- Emmanuel Baptist Church (Alexandria, Louisiana), listed on the NRHP
- Emmanuel Baptist (Worcester, Massachusetts), listed on the NRHP
- Emmanuel Baptist Church (Brooklyn, New York), listed on the NRHP
- Emmanuel Baptist Church (Yangon, Myanmar)
- Emmanuel Baptist Church (Belleville, Ontario)
- Emmanuel Baptist Church, in San Francisco, California, the site of 2 murders by Theodore Durrant in the late 19th century
