= Emmanuel Church (Killingworth, Connecticut) =

Historic church in Connecticut, United States

- Emmanuel Episcopal Church
- U.S. National Register of Historic Places
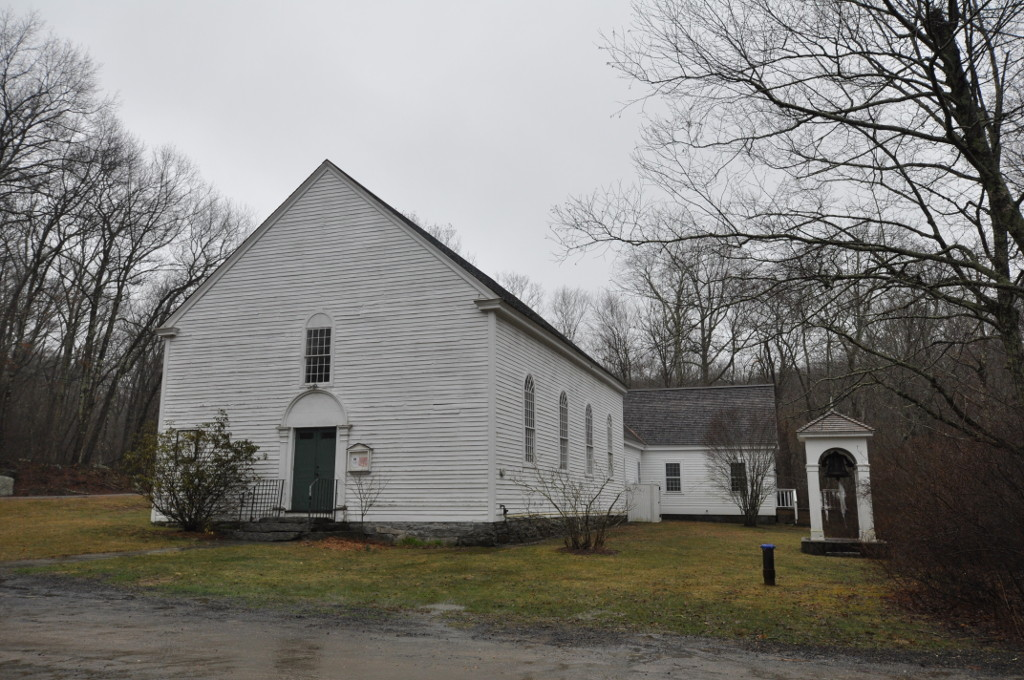

- Location within Connecticut Location within the United States
- Location: 50 Emmanuel Church Road, Killingworth, Connecticut
- Coordinates: 41°23′34″N 72°36′33″W
- Area: 1 acre (0.40 ha)
- Built: 1800
- Architectural style: Federal
- NRHP reference No.: 99000924
- Added to NRHP: August 05, 1999

Emmanuel Episcopal Church is an historic church building at 50 Emmanuel Church Road in Killingworth, Connecticut, United States.

== History ==
The church society was organized in the mid-eighteenth century and known as the Episcopalian Society of North Bristol (now North Madison) and North Killingworth. In 1800, the society was organized as a parish of the Episcopal Diocese of Connecticut. The society erected the present church in 1803 and it was called Union Church after 1805.

The church, located off Route 148, was organized on July 10, 1800, by 19 residents of North Madison (then North Bristol, named after the Bristol family who were founding members of the church) and two residents of Killingworth. The church building was completed and formally consecrated by Bishop John Henry Hobart of New York in 1817. The first part-time pastor, Nathan Bennett Burgess, was hired in 1801.

The church was slightly enlarged and formally renamed Emmanuel Church, which is Latin for "God is with us", in 1869. The church fell on hard times in the late nineteenth century. The handful of families remaining in the congregation considered selling the building.

The Rev. George B. Gilbert, a native of Randolph, Vermont, arrived as pastor in 1909. Gilbert, a graduate of Trinity College and Berkeley Divinity School (now associated with Yale University) who lived in Middletown, had just had a falling out with leaders of the Church of the Holy Trinity in Middletown over his informal style and populist political views.

Gilbert revitalized Emmanuel Church, building the congregation and holding picnics that would draw hundreds of people to the remote Killingworth location. During nearly four decades at Emmanuel Church, he also was pastor of the Church of the Epiphany in Durham and St. James Church in Haddam, also in Middlesex County.

When the Christian Herald was looking for a "traditional country preacher" to be the subject of a book in the late 1930s, the magazine's readers recommended Gilbert as the perfect choice. The autobiography he wrote for the magazine, Forty Years a Country Preacher, was published by Harper and Brothers in 1939. It topped The New York Times Best Seller list for several months and made Gilbert the subject of a photo spread and article in the July 24, 1939, edition of Life magazine as well as an article in Time. Gilbert's son, Charles, said his father wrote the book in long hand while recovering from an operation on his foot. The manuscript was typed by his daughter, Virginia Gilbert.

The Rev. Gilbert, who also was a state representative and chaplain of the state Senate, died in 1948 at age 76. Gilbert said his father was a man who believed that dedicating his life to the church also required a dedication to the least fortunate members of society. Gilbert would take in homeless people and parolees from the old Wethersfield State Prison to live and work at his 25-acre farm, which was located at the intersection of Millbrook Road and Prout Hill Road in Middletown. "He liked to help poor people, that was his bent," Gilbert said. "We always had one or two strangers, people who were down on their luck, living with us." Virginia Gilbert, who worked as the librarian at Woodrow Wilson High School in Middletown, struggled to hold the dwindling congregation together during the 1950s.

In the late 1960s, the church was changed from a parish to a mission to secure additional financial support from the state Episcopal diocese. The aid included installing electricity at the church for the first time, in 1970.

In 1980 the church joined the Middlesex Area Cluster Ministry, a regional ministry that for the past three decades has provided rotating ministers for small Episcopal churches in Killingworth, St. James in Higganum and St. Andrew's in Northford.

The construction of a parish hall and kitchen in 1989 brought Emmanuel Church its first indoor plumbing facilities. The congregation had used an outhouse for the preceding 189 years.

== Inside the church ==
The church houses an organ built by the firm Karl Wilhelm Inc. of Mont-Saint-Hilaire, Quebec. In its design and construction, the organ is true to historic principles, dating back to the seventeenth century. The free-standing self-contained case is made of white oak with hand-carved butternut pipe shades, which are gilded with 22 karat gold leaf. The natural keys are covered with ebony and the sharps are rosewood and plated with cow bone. There are 8 stops of metal pipes which are of tin-lead alloy, that provide an amazing versatility of sounds, from soft to bright and full. The Bourdon 16’ and 8’, played with the feet on the pedal board, are made of wood and are used to play the bass notes. There is a total of 636 pipes.

The church also has a single stained glass window and a brass chandelier.

== Current use ==
The church's outreach programs include Helping Hands Food Bank, HK Back Pack programs, Welcome baskets for the Albert J. Solnit Children's Center, Amazing Grace Food Pantry, St. Vincent dePaul's Place, Bishop's Fund for Children, Heifer International, Lulac Head Start, New Horizons Women's Shelter, clothing collections for the South Dakota Indians and Mision Divino Salvador in Bogota, Colombia.

The building was added to the National Register of Historic Places in 1999.

== See also ==
- National Register of Historic Places listings in Middlesex County, Connecticut
