= Killingworth, Connecticut =

- Town
- Town of Killingworth
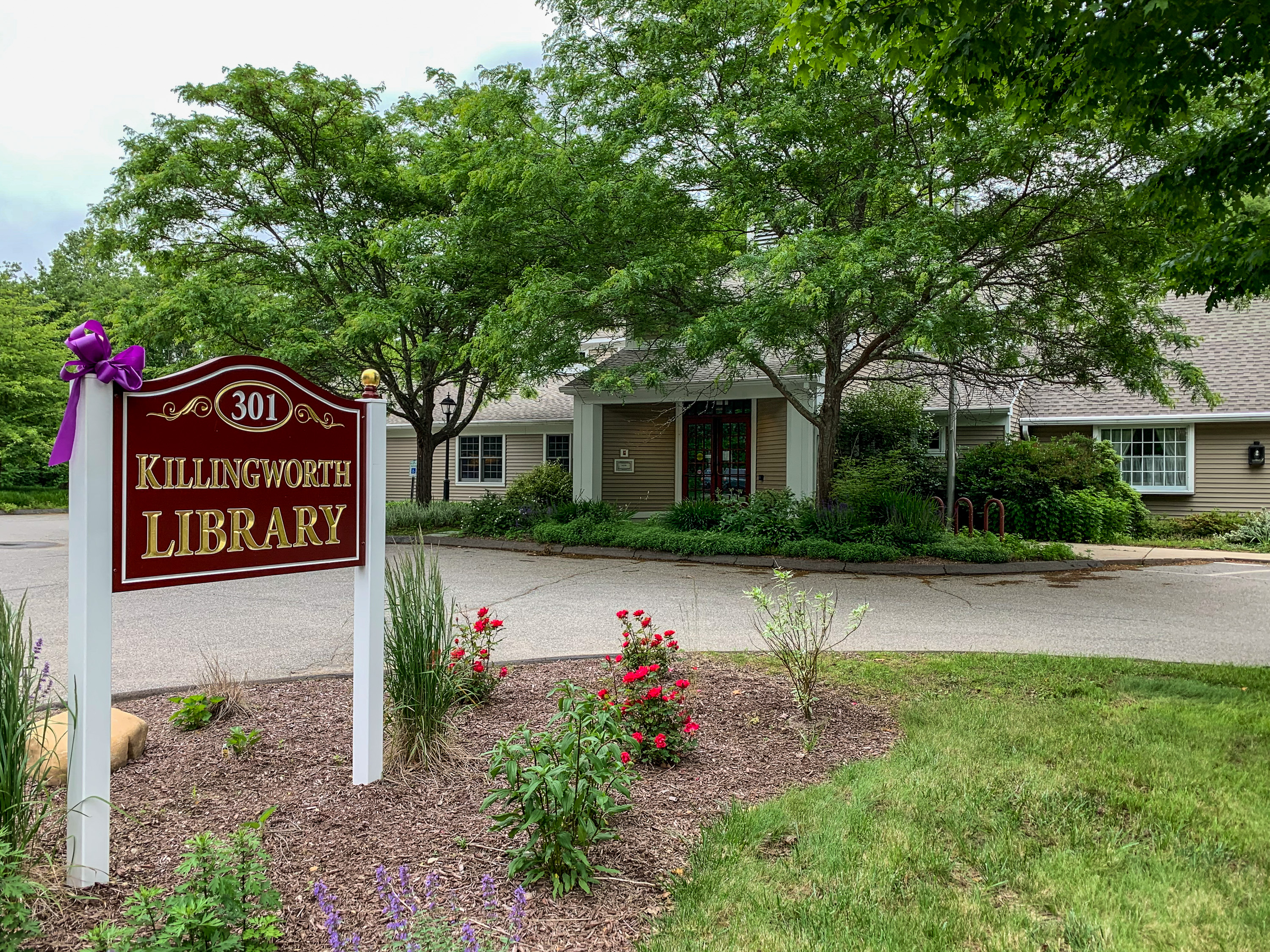
- Killingworth Library Association

- Seal
- Interactive map of Killingworth, Connecticut
- Coordinates: 41°22′50″N 72°34′35″W
- Country: United States
- U.S. state: Connecticut
- County: Middlesex
- Region: Lower CT River Valley
- Named: 1667

Government
  - Type: Selectman-town meeting
  - First Selectman: Eric Couture (D)
  - Selectman: Joel D'Angelo (D)
  - Selectman: Eric Nunes (R)

Area
  - Total: 35.8 sq mi (92.7 km^{2})
  - Land: 35.3 sq mi (91.5 km^{2})
  - Water: 0.46 sq mi (1.2 km^{2})
- Elevation: 354 ft (108 m)

Population (2020)
  - Total: 6,174
  - Density: 175/sq mi (67.5/km^{2})
- Time zone: UTC-5 (Eastern)
  - Summer (DST): UTC-4 (Eastern In)
- ZIP code: 06419
- Area codes: 860/959
- FIPS code: 09-40710
- GNIS feature ID: 0213448
- Website: townofkillingworth.com

Killingworth is a town in Middlesex County, Connecticut, United States. The town is part of the Lower Connecticut River Valley Planning Region. The population was 6,174 at the 2020 United States census.

== History ==
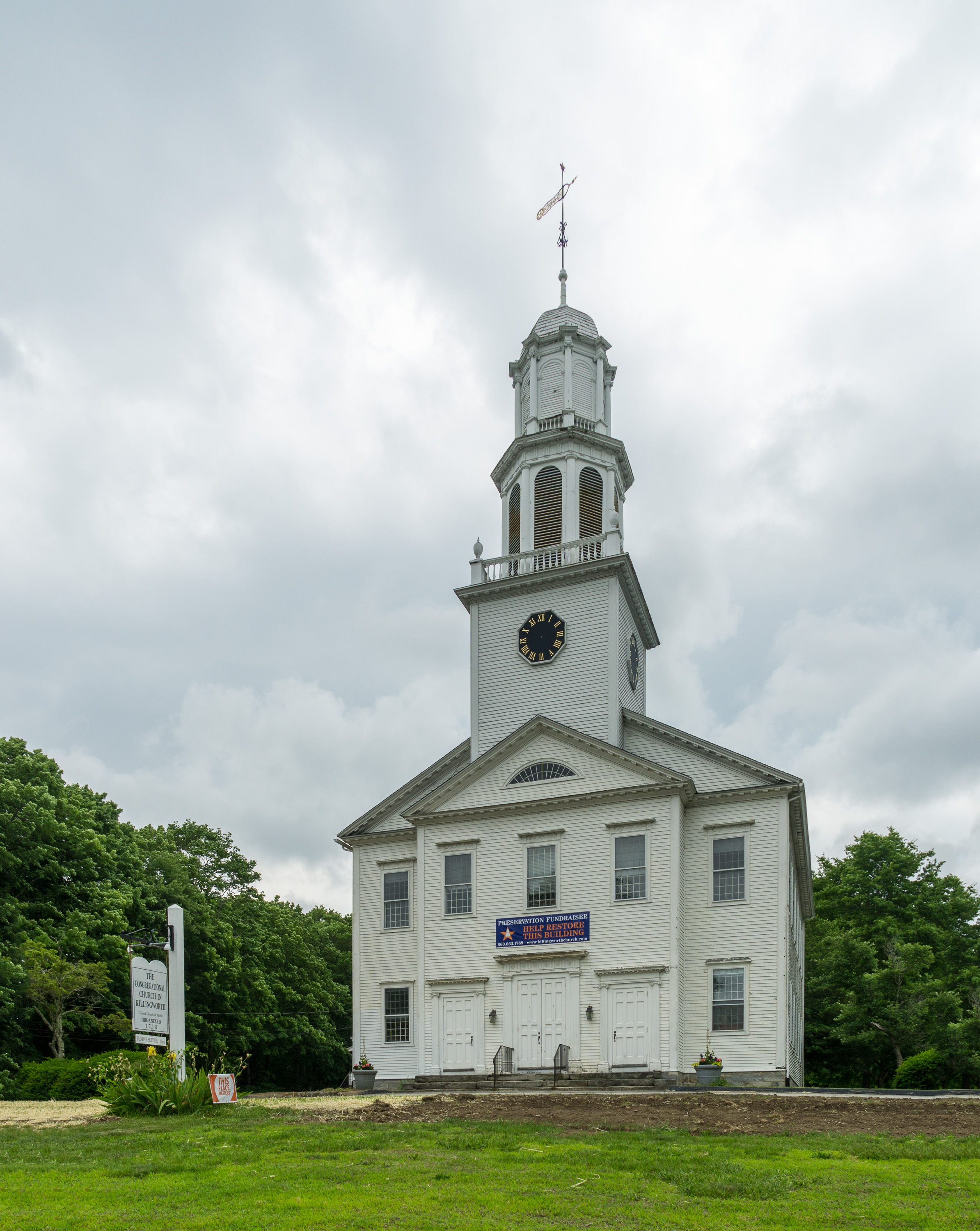
Congregational Church along route 81

Killingworth was established from the area called Hammonasset, taken from the local Native American tribe of the same name. The area originally incorporated the area of the present town of Clinton, which was separated from Killingworth along ecclesiastical borders in 1838. Part of New London County prior to May 1785, Killingworth was then included in the newly formed Middlesex County, where it remains today.

The New England town received its name from Kenilworth, England, the previous home of one of the first settlers in New England, Edward Griswold. Kenilworth's name resembled "Killingworth" during the colonial American period, though over time the pronunciations and spellings of the names drifted toward the two distinct modern ones. A town and village in England called Killingworth and Killingworth Village, in the county of Tyne and Wear, do not appear to have any connection with Killingworth, Connecticut.

In the late 17th century, Killingworth became the birthplace of what would eventually become Yale University. The Rev. Abraham Pierson, the college's first president, taught some of the first classes in his Killingworth home—which is actually in present-day Clinton, Connecticut. However, in 1701, the college's first official home was constructed in Old Saybrook on the peninsula known as Saybrook Point donated by Yale's first Treasurer Nathanial Lynde. Eventually the school was moved to its present-day home in New Haven.

== Geography ==
According to the United States Census Bureau, the town has an area of 35.8 square miles (93 km^{2}). Of this total, 35.3 square miles (91 km^{2}) is dry land and 0.5 square miles (1.3 km^{2}) – or 1.34% – is water-covered.

Killingworth also contains Chatfield Hollow State Park.

== Demographics ==
Historical population
Census	Pop.	Note	%±
1790	2,156		—
1800	2,047		−5.1%
1810	2,244		9.6%
1820	2,342		4.4%
1830	2,484		6.1%
1840	1,130		−54.5%
1850	1,107		−2.0%
1860	1,126		1.7%
1870	856		−24.0%
1880	748		−12.6%
1890	582		−22.2%
1900	651		11.9%
1910	660		1.4%
1920	531		−19.5%
1930	482		−9.2%
1940	1,230		155.2%
1950	677		−45.0%
1960	1,098		62.2%
1970	2,435		121.8%
1980	3,976		63.3%
1990	4,814		21.1%
2000	6,018		25.0%
2010	6,525		8.4%
2020	6,174		−5.4%
U.S. Decennial Census

As of the census of July 1, 2015, there were 6,455 people, 2,513 households, and 1,765 families residing in the town. The population density was 184.7 inhabitants per square mile (71.3/km^{2}). There were 2,598 housing units at an average density of 70.6 per square mile (24.9/km^{2}). The racial makeup of the town was 96.4% White, 0.7% African American, 0.2% Native American, 1.1% Asian, 0.1% Native Hawaiian and Other Pacific Islander, 2.2% Hispanic or Latino, and 1.3% Two or More Races.

There were 2,513 households, with a 95.3% occupancy rate, out of which 23.9% had children under the age of 18 living with them, 73.8% were married couples living together, 4.3% had a female householder with no husband present, and 19.6% were non-families. 16.1% of all households were made up of individuals, and 8.0% had someone living alone who was 65 years of age or older. The average household size was 2.74 and the average family size was 3.08.

In the town, the population was spread out, with 4% under the age of 5, 23.9% under the age of 18, 3.6% from 18 to 24, 29.4% from 25 to 44, 28.0% from 45 to 64, and 16% who were 65 years of age or older. The median age was 40 years. For every 100 females, there were 98.4 males. For every 100 females age 18 and over, there were 96.8 males.

The median income for a household in the town was $112,137. The per capita income for the town was $48,537. None of the families and 1.7% of the population were living below the poverty line, including no under eighteens and 1.4% of those over 64.

== Arts and culture ==
Listings on the National Register of Historic places:

- Emmanuel Church, added August 5, 1999
- Oak Lodge, added September 4, 1986
- Parmelee House (Killingworth, Connecticut).

== Government ==
Killingworth is governed by a Board of Selectmen, headed by First Selectman Eric Couture.

Voter Registration and Party Enrollment as of October 31, 2023
Party	Total voters	Percentage
Unaffiliated	2,310	43.4%
Democratic	1,437	27%
Republican	1,502	28.2%
Minor parties	79	1.48%
Total	5,328	100%

== Education ==
Students attending school in Killingworth are a part of Connecticut's Regional School District #17, which consists of Haddam and its villages of Haddam Neck (located on the eastern bank of the Connecticut River) and Higganum. The high school, Haddam-Killingworth High School (often abbreviated as simply "HK"), is located in Higganum. The middle-school, Haddam Killingworth Intermediate-Middle School, was built in Killingworth in 2006 and houses grades 4 through 8. The elementary schools, Burr Elementary School and Killingworth Elementary School are located in Higganum and Killingworth respectively. The school's sports teams are called the 'Cougars'.

== Infrastructure ==
The Estuary Transit District provides public transportation throughout Killingworth and the surrounding towns through its 9 Town Transit Service. Services include connections to the Old Saybrook Train Station, served by Amtrak and Shoreline East railroads.

== Notable people ==
- Jeff Bagwell, Hall of Fame Major League Baseball player for the Houston Astros
- Carleton Beals, journalist, author, historian, and a crusader with special interests in Latin America
- Abel Buell, publisher of the first map of the new United States created by an American
- Jonathan Bush, American banker, brother of President George H. W. Bush
- Titus Coan, missionary to Hawaii
- Silas Halsey, former US Congressman
- Haynes Johnson, Pulitzer Prize–winning journalist, author and political analyst
- Camille Kostek, model who was on the cover of Sports Illustrated Swimsuit Issue
- Ricki Lake, television personality
- Hugh Lofting, author of the Doctor Dolittle series
- Washington F. Willcox, U.S. Congressman (March 4, 1889 – March 3, 1893), born on North Chestnut Hill on August 22, 1834
- Fredric Jameson, professor and literary critic

== In popular culture ==
The town was the subject of the poet Henry Wadsworth Longfellow's poem "The Birds of Killingworth" published in Tales of a Wayside Inn.
