= Cockaponset State Forest =

Largest forest in Connecticut, United States

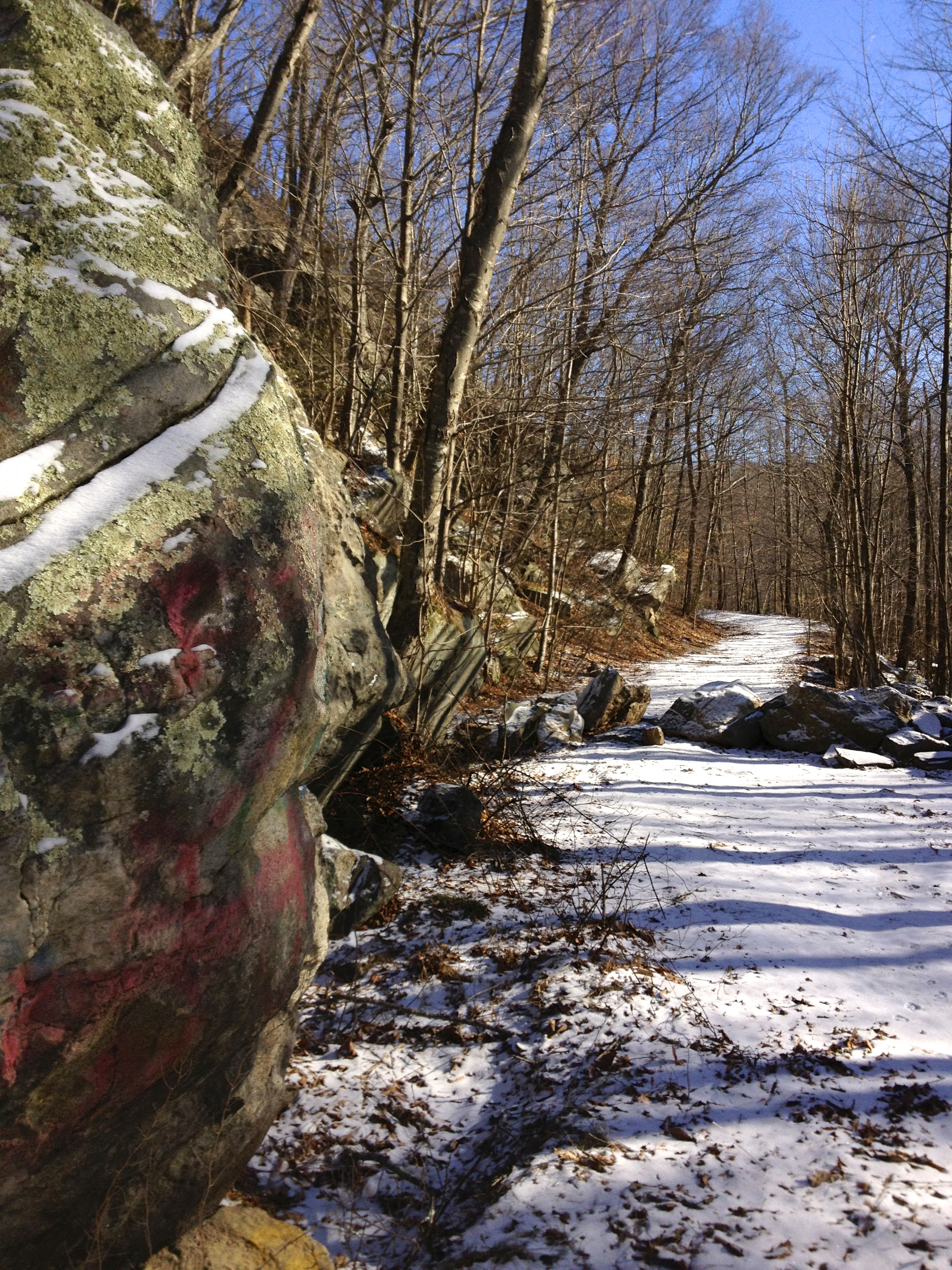
- Barrier at non-motor vehicle section of Pine Ledge Road/Trail

- Location within Connecticut Location within the United States
- Location: Connecticut, United States
- Coordinates: 41°26′28″N 72°32′01″W
- Area: 17,186 acres (6,955 ha)
- Elevation: 430 ft (130 m)
- Established: 1926
- Administrator: Connecticut Department of Energy and Environmental Protection
- Website: Official website

Cockaponset State Forest is the second largest forest in the Connecticut state forest system, encompassing over 17,000 acres (6,900 ha) of land. Most of the land is in Middlesex County though some parcels lie in New Haven County. The forest is disjointed, and comprises land in the towns of Haddam, Chester, Deep River, Killingworth, Durham, Guilford, Madison, Clinton, Westbrook, Middletown and Middlefield.

== History ==
Prior to European settlement, the section forest nearest Haddam was part of the Wangunk village of Cockaponset. Modern acquisition of forest parcels began in 1926. Two Civilian Conservation Corps camps were active in the forest in the 1930s constructing roads and planting conifers. The forest is purportedly named after a Native American chief buried in Haddam. However, it may have been named after the Wangunk village.

== Features ==
National natural landmark

A portion of the forest is known as the Chester Cedar Swamp and was declared a National Natural Landmark in May 1973. Along with Pachaug-Great Meadow Swamp, it is one of the finest remaining examples of an Atlantic white cedar forest. This type of forest is at risk and being succeeded by hemlock.

Hiking trails

The Connecticut Department of Energy and Environmental Protection (CT DEEP) manages a 20-mile (32 km) trail system based around Pattaconk Reservoir Recreation Area near Chester. Some trails have been designated for footpath only, while others are open to horses and mountain bikes. The centerpiece for this area is the scenic Pattaconk Lake which is used for swimming, fishing, and paddling. Even though the CT DEEP has maps detailing only 20 miles (32 km) of trails, there are over 100 miles (160 km) of trails within the greater Cockaponset State Forest. According to the headquarters at Chatfield Hollow State Park, many of these unmarked trails have an undesignated status, which means that the CT DEEP has either not yet decided their use or are within an area earmarked for logging in the future. These undesignated trails are currently open to most users willing to respect low-impact travel.

Rock climbing

Pine Ledge is a popular rock climbing destination within Cockaponset State Forest located about a half mile west of Deep River, Connecticut. The rocky cliff is as high as 60 feet (18 m) at its southern end and extends for about a half mile north. The larger cliff faces are primarily used with top-roping techniques and there are several large bouldering rocks. The locals have also adopted the name, "Pine Ledge," to describe the surrounding section of Cockaponset State Forest where the Pine Ledge cliff resides.

At this time, the access roads are somewhat rugged and may become thick with mud after a heavy rain or during the spring melt. However, there are hardly any large rocks and few bumps, and the road is usually pretty wide. Even though the use of all-terrain-vehicles has not been officially designated, the greater Pine Ledge area has become very popular among local riders. Jeeps and 4X4 off-road vehicles have also utilized some of the old abandoned access roads as trails. There are foot paths through dense mountain laurel throughout the Pine Ledge rock climbing area as access to the more remote cliff edges.

== In popular culture ==
An assertion that geological features of the park represent the remains of a 1500-year-old European church have been disputed.
