= Bokov =

Bokov (Bulgarian: Боков, Russian: Боков) is a Slavic masculine surname, its feminine counterpart is Bokova or Boková. It may refer to:

== Bokov ==
- Danila Bokov (born 2002), Russian football player; son of Maksim
- Denis Bokov (born 2005), Russian football player
- Georgi Bokov (1920–1989), Bulgarian editor and member of the Bulgarian resistance movement during World War II; father of Irina
- Konstantin Bokov (born 1940), Ukrainian-born American artist; son of Viktor
- Maksim Bokov (born 1973), Russian football player and coach; father of Danila
- Nicolas Bokov (1945–2019), Russian poet
- Viktor Bokov (1914–2009), Russian and Soviet poet, writer, and collector; father of Konstantin

== Bokova, Boková ==
- Irina Bokova (born 1952), Bulgarian politician; daughter of Georgi
- Jana Boková (born 1948), Czech film director
- Jenovéfa Boková (born 1991), Czech actress and violinist
