= Outsider Art Fair =

International art fair

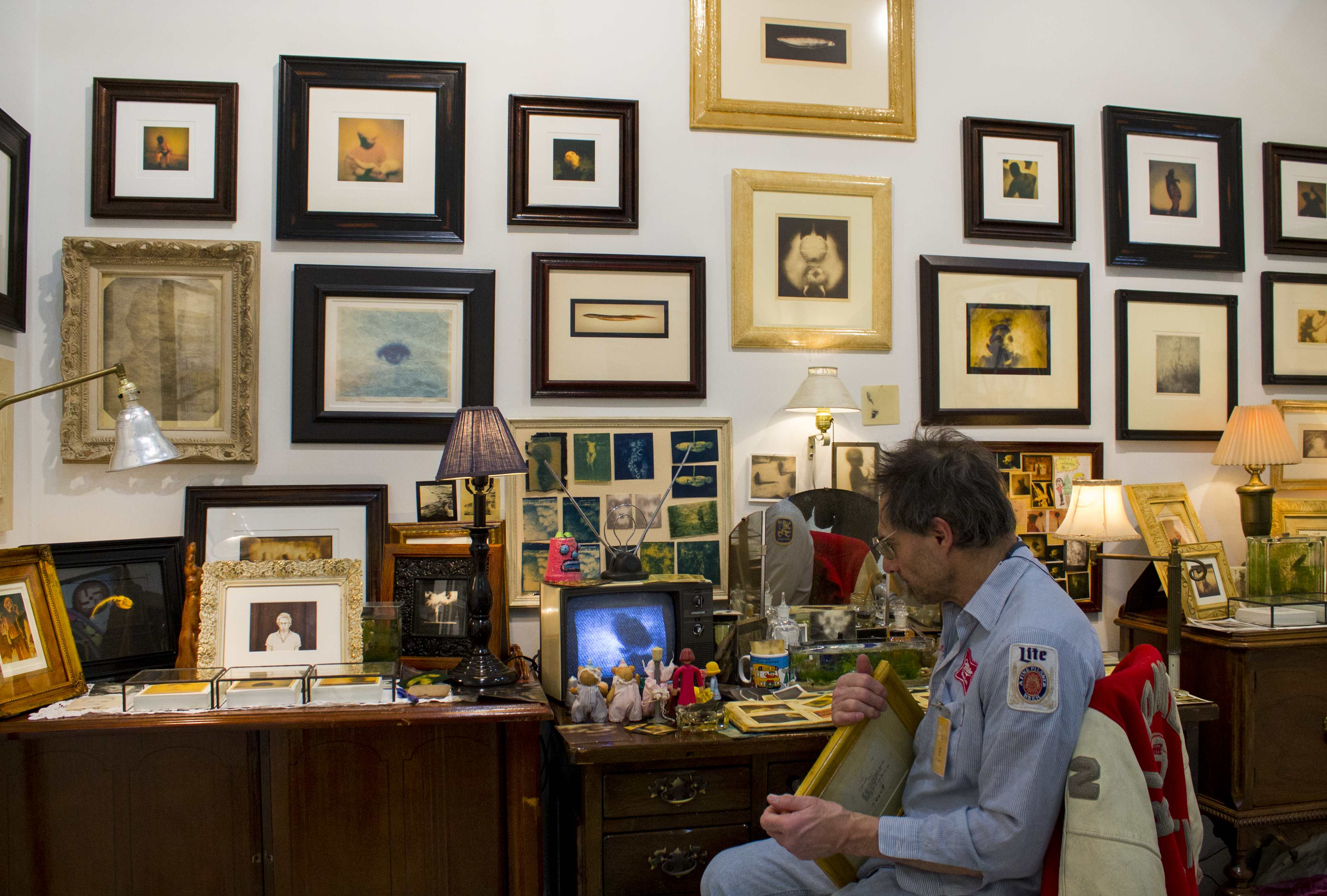
- John Brill at the Outsider Art Fair in New York (2015)
- Status: Active
- Genre: Art Fair
- Dates: January & October
- Frequency: Biannual
- Locations: New York City, New York, USA, & Paris, France
- Years active: 1993 – present
- Founder: Sandy Smith
- Sponsor: Andrew Edlin
- Website: https://www.outsiderartfair.com/

The Outsider Art Fair or OAF is an international exhibition that features outsider artists who work in a variety of mediums. It is a biannual fair occurring in New York City and Paris, the former taking place in January and the latter in October. Plans were made for a Basel edition in 2018 to run alongside Art Basel, but has since been postponed until further notice.

== History ==
The Outsider Art Fair was founded in New York in 1993 by Sanford L. Smith as a way to help outsider artists exhibit and showcase their work.

In 2013, the fair was bought by the art dealer Andrew Edlin through the company Wide Open Arts, LLC. The Outsider Art Fair originated in New York, but has subsequently expanded to Paris, the first edition of which took place in October 2013.

The fair takes place twice annually: with the New York edition taking place in January and the Paris edition in October. The New York edition takes place at the Metropolitan Pavilion, with the Paris venue located in Hôtel du Duc.

In 2018, the Paris venue moved to Atelier Richelieu.

== New York ==
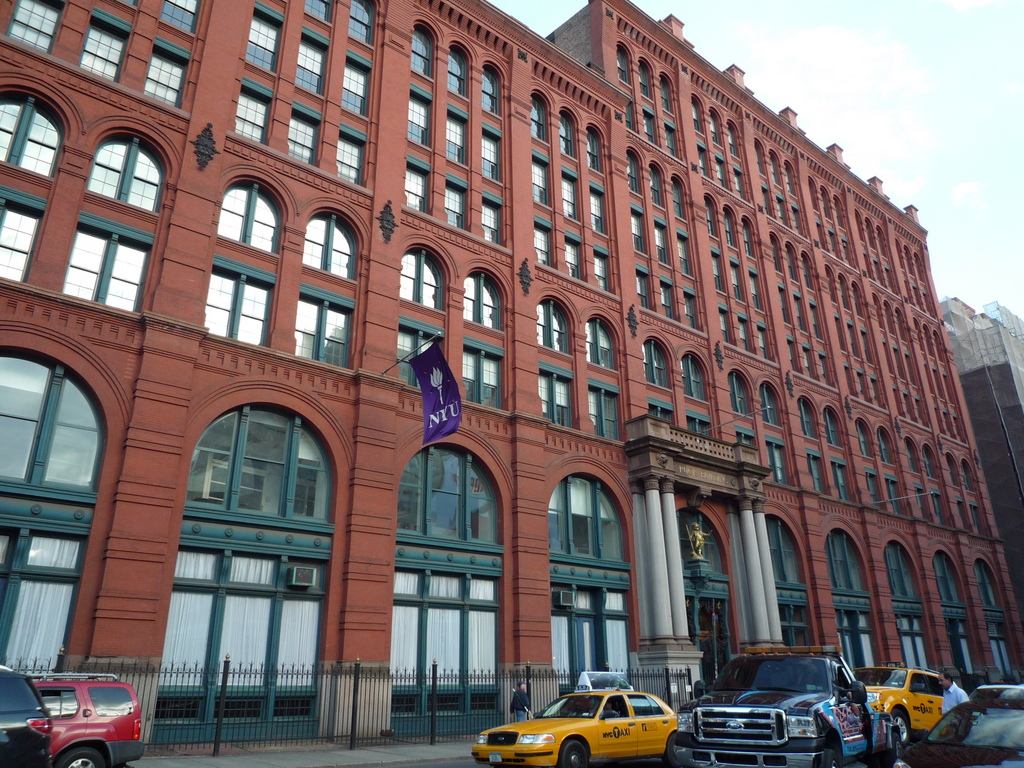
Puck Building, New York City, Where Outsider Art Fair was first located in 1993

Active since 1993, The New York edition of the Outsider Art Fair celebrated its 27th year in January 2019. Sandy Smith, who was previously known for The Fall Antiques Show in 1979, founded the Outsider Art Fair following suggestions from close advisors. The name of the fair is said to have originated from Roger Cardinal's book Outsider Art (1972); Cardinal coined the term Outsider Art as an alternative to the French Art Brut. The first edition of the fair took place in Manhattan's Puck Building and most recently has been located at the Metropolitan Pavilion. In 2012, Andrew Edlin offered financial support to the fair which was declining in popularity by recruiting vendors and other assistance, and in 2013 acquired the Outsider Art Fair under his company Wide Open Arts. After its acquisition by Wide Open Arts, the Outsider Art Fair is said to have tripled its attendance at its New York location and Wide Open Arts then launched the Paris edition of the fair. Since its acquisition, the New York Outsider Art Fair has been located at Center 548, which was an event venue that no longer exists, and the Metropolitan Pavilion, and generally hosts over 60 exhibitors.

== Paris ==
Outsider Art, originating in the Art Brut movement, has a well-documented history in Paris, France. The Outsider Art Fair Paris acts as a companion event to the Outsider Art Fair New York, with both fairs held annually.

The Outsider Art Fair Paris, taking place mid- to late October, originally premiered in Paris, France, in 2013. The inaugural event was to take place at l' Hotel Le A, and had held thousands of visitors. The inaugural contributors included the American Primitive Gallery in New York, Galerie Christian Berst – Paris, Galerie Luc Berthier – Paris, Henry Boxer Gallery – London, Chris Byrne + Marquand Books – Seattle, WA, Cavin-Morris Gallery -New York, the Creative Growth Art Center – Oakland, Andrew Edlin Gallery – New York, Fleisher-Ollman Gallery – Philadelphia, the Garde Rail Gallery – Austin, Grimaldis Gallery – Baltimore, Gallery at HAI – New York, and the Karen Lennox Gallery – Chicago, IL.

The event, initially situated conveniently at l'Hotel Le A is just blocks away from the annual Foire Internationale d'Art Contemporain (FIAC) at La Grand Palais. The Outsider Art Fair has since been relocated to l'Hôtel du Duc at 22 Rue de la Michodière in Paris France. Beginning in 2015 the fair had been relocated to accommodate a greater amount of art dealers totaling 38 vendors in all. The fair has most recently been relocated to Atelier Richelieu in the past year of 2018 although various Artists Talks and lectures will continue to incur through L'Hotel le Duc. The new location at Atelier Richelieu, located in the 2nd Arrondissement is more accessible to guests of FIAC at La Grand Palais and supports exhibitions and vendors who work in solidarity with Art Brut in supporting self taught artists who are working outside of the coincidental linearity of mainstream mass culture.

== Controversy ==
The Outsider Art Fair has often been the subject to critique and discussion. The purpose of The Outsider Art Fair is to exhibit work by self-taught and unknown artists to a wider audience. It has been speculated that exhibiting outsider art in mainstream galleries and private collections can take the spotlight away from the stories and lives of the makers, by focusing on the art as objects. It has also been observed that because of the popularity of The Outsider Art Fair, certain art styles and aesthetics quickly become popularized and consequently redundant. The precarious experiences of outsider artists become diluted when experienced by an audience and the deeper implications of the work are less considered.

Since Outsider Art is often created by people who have been incarcerated, institutionalized or otherwise marginalized, their role as arts practitioners is more contentious than the actual appeal of the work itself. Artists experience a brief period of prolific art making in their lives and afterwards do not produce anything.

The task of defining art as outsider has often been subject to critique. The term outsider is highly popularized and encapsulates a huge variety of art styles, makers, and stories. An example of this is the upcoming Atlanta Biennial, which presents works made by artists from southeastern states, but rejects the notion of the works being outsider, or even folk.

Organizations like the Souls Grown Deep Foundation aim to preserve the work of artists in the African American south. All are self-taught artists, though their intentions and context are slightly different.

- Anne marie Grgich — Books, Collage, Painting
- Della Wells – Collage
- Sharon Kerry-Harlan — Quilt, Painting, Mixed Media
- Rosemery Ollison – Drawing, Sculpture
- Bernard Gilardi – Painting
- Adolf Wölfli – Drawing
- Alcides Peirera dos Santos — Painting
- Francis Marié – Mixed Media
- Eugene Andolsek – Ink Drawing
- Eddie Arning – Painting
- Vahakn Arslanian — Drawing, Painting
- Beverly Baker – Drawing
- Morton Bartlett – Photography
- Konstantin Bokov – paintings, sculptures, assemblages
- Eugène Gabritschevsky – Painting, Drawing
- Richard Greaves — Photography
- Raphaël Lonné – Drawing
- Purvis Young – Collage, Painting
- Joseph Yoakum – Drawing
- Scottie Wilson — Drawing
- George Widener – Drawing, Mixed Media
- Mary Whitfield – Watercolour
- Eugene Von Bruenchenhein – Painting, Photography
- Willem Van Genk — Painting, Drawing, Mixed Media
- Ionel Talpazan – Drawing, Painting
- Charles Steffen – Drawing
- Janet Sobel – Painting
- Mary Tillman Smith — Painting
- Jon Serl – Painting
- William Scott – Painting
- Auguste Forestier – Sculpture
- Gertrude Morgan — Drawing, Painting, Installation
- Judith Scott – Mixed Media, Sculpture
- Horace Pippin – Painting
