= Man Proposes, God Disposes =

Painting by Edwin Henry Landseer

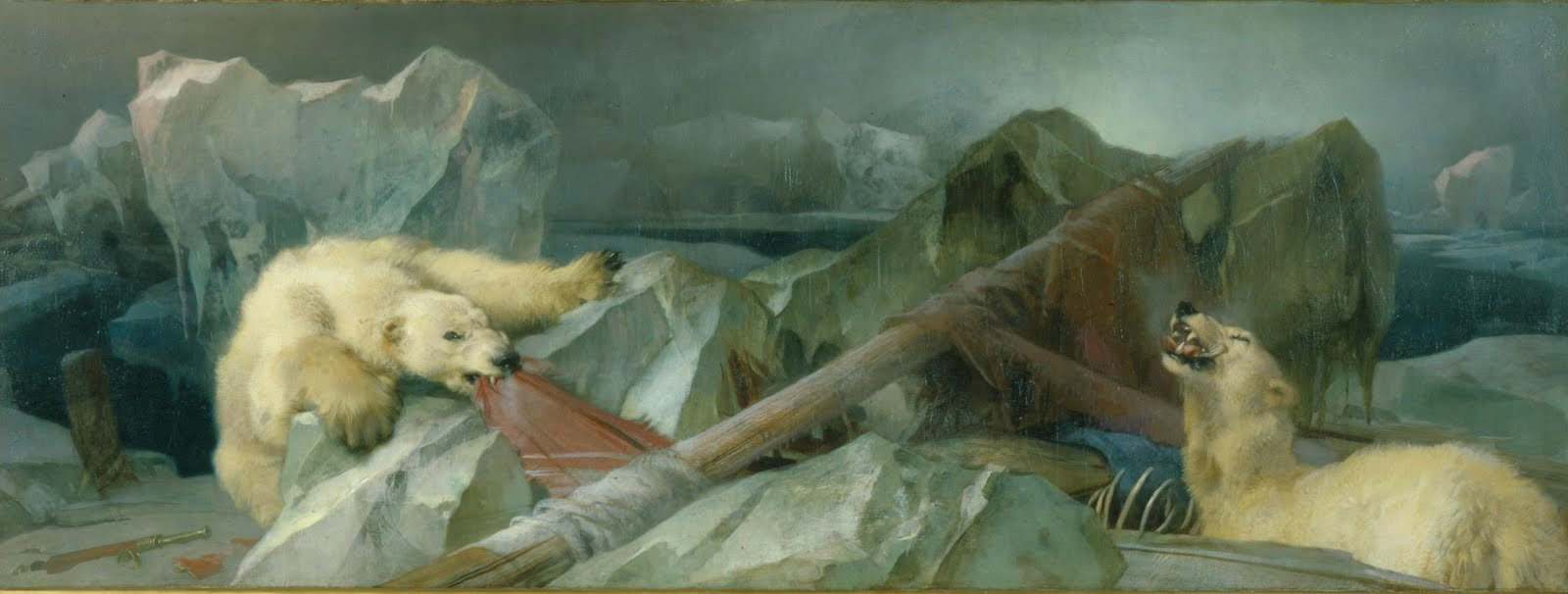
- Artist: Sir Edwin Landseer
- Year: 1864
- Medium: oil on canvas
- Dimensions: 91.4 cm × 243.7 cm (36.0 in × 95.9 in)
- Location: Royal Holloway, University of London, London

Man Proposes, God Disposes is an 1864 oil-on-canvas painting by the English artist Sir Edwin Landseer. The work was inspired by the search for Franklin's lost expedition which disappeared in the Arctic after 1845. The painting is in the collection of Royal Holloway, University of London, and is the subject of superstitious urban myth that the painting is haunted.

== Description ==
The painting adopts the dark tones of Landseer's later works. The scene shows two polar bears among the scattered wreckage of the expedition – a telescope, the tattered remains of a Red Ensign, a sail, and human rib bones, which William Michael Rossetti called "the saddest of membra disjecta". The image shows humanity and civilization defeated by "nature, red in tooth and claw", and can be seen as a commentary on the crisis of British triumphalism and imperialism in the middle of the 19th century.

=== Background ===
The painting depicts an imagined Arctic scene in the aftermath of Sir John Franklin's expedition in 1845 to explore the Northwest Passage.

The 134 men of Franklin's expedition left Greenhithe in May 1845 on two steam-powered ironclad icebreakers, HMS Erebus and HMS Terror. After five left the ship, the remaining 129 men were last seen by a whaling vessel in Lancaster Sound in July 1845, but then disappeared without trace into the ice. The expedition was well-provisioned for a voyage of several years, but eventually, search parties were sent out as time passed and no further sightings were made. In 1854, Inuit recounted tales of sightings in 1850 to Captain John Rae of the Hudson's Bay Company, and he found some dead bodies on King William Island. Rae also reported suspicions of cannibalism among the last survivors.

In 1859, Francis Leopold McClintock published The Voyage of the Fox in the Arctic Seas, an account of his voyage on the Fox in search of Franklin from 1857 to 1859, and his discovery of the remains of two crew from Erebus on King William Island earlier in 1859, together with the ship's boat and other detritus.

The painting may also have been inspired by Caspar David Friedrich's 1824 painting The Sea of Ice, and Frederic Edwin Church's The Icebergs, which was first exhibited in New York in 1861 and shown in London in 1863.

== Origin of the title ==
Dutch medal of 1588 bearing the Latin inscription Homo Proponit Deus Disponit (Man Proposes God Disposes)

The phrase "Man proposes, but God disposes" is a translation of the Latin phrase "Homo proponit, sed Deus disponit" from Book I, chapter 19, of The Imitation of Christ, a 15th-century book by the German cleric Thomas à Kempis. A few modernized and paraphrased Bible translations use it as a translation of Proverbs 19:21, but the original of that verse is longer and more elaborate.

The phrase was also put on a Dutch commemorative medal celebrating the Elizabethan England Protestant victory in 1588 over the Catholic Spanish Armada.

A similar phrase appears in the concluding lines of Lucian's "Symposium" (circa 150 AD), quoting from the concluding lines of Euripides's Alcestis, Andromache, Helen, and Bacchae (5th century BC): "πολλὰ δ᾽ ἀέλπτως κραίνουσι θεοί" (loosely translated, "the gods bring many matters to surprising ends").

== Reception ==
The painting was exhibited at the 1864 Royal Academy summer exhibition. Lady Franklin was invited to the exhibition, but avoided the "offensive" painting.

The Art Journal described its "poetry, pathos, and terror" and "tragic grandeur", the Athenaeum noted an "epic" quality, and the Saturday Review praised its "sublimity of sentiment". The painting was sold at auction to Thomas Holloway in 1881. It currently hangs in the picture gallery of Royal Holloway, University of London.

=== Urban myth ===
It is well-documented that students at Royal Holloway believe the painting to be cursed or haunted. A legend among students dating back to at least around the 1920s or 1930s, and still held in the 1980s, was that anyone sitting in front of the painting during an exam would fail it. A college tradition requires temporarily covering the painting with a Union Jack when student examinations are ongoing. This originated with an incident during the 1970s where an exam invigilator hurriedly covered the painting with the first thing they could find that would be large enough, as a student refused to sit their exam by the uncovered painting.

The legend of the bad luck painting later developed into an urban myth that a student taking exams had committed suicide after looking at the painting, writing "The polar bears made me do it" onto their exam paper. There is, however, no university record of a death in the picture gallery. The college's curator said in a 2014 interview that "I've heard it was a girl, I've heard it was a boy, I've heard about three different ways that they killed themselves."

== In popular culture ==
The US noise rock band Sprain has a song titled after the painting on their 2023 album The Lamb as Effigy.
