= Rod Kagan =

American sculptor (1940–2010)

Roderick H. "Rod" Kagan (March 25, 1940 – December 14, 2010) was an American artist known for his totem pole-like bronze sculptures. Born in South Orange, New Jersey, he moved to Ketchum, Idaho, in 1975 and worked there until his death. He was named the winner of the 1984 National Endowment for the Arts and his artwork has been displayed in multiple museums, galleries and public spaces throughout Idaho and the United States. His estate is represented by Gail Severn Gallery.

== Biography ==
=== Early life ===
As a child in Short Hills, New Jersey, Rod worked in the butcher shop of his father, Alfred Blanchard Kagan, where while working he accidentally cut off the end of one of his forefingers. This accident pushed him away from butchering as a career. His mother, Marie Hill Kagan, was a painter. He said of her:

"[She] painted most of her life. I remember visiting the Whitney Museum in New York with her and laughing at the Andy Warhols like they were a joke, but now you see what history has made of him. I guess I still laugh at him."

At age 12 he would solder tin cans into model boats. He would build model cars as well as model airplanes, trains and other vehicles and by age 15, he had stripped and lowered a 1932 Ford into a hot rod. According to Gail Severn, this eye for mechanical functionality helped formulate the industrial quality of his later artwork. He graduated from Bernardsville High School.

=== The Idaho Years ===
Kagan came to the West in 1973 to visit his brother in Heron, Montana after his family sold their business. In 1974, he created his first geometric sculpture, the steel lady, which would become a prototype for much of his future work. He found a small but strong art scene in Ketchum, Idaho. The Sun Valley Center for the Arts was only a couple years old at the time, but it was at one of the meetings of the group that he met Gail Severn. The Center was an "incubator" that gave people permission to be artists and was where Kagan's career began to take shape.

He moved to Ketchum, Idaho, in 1975 and began producing assemblage work out of transmission gears he found at the Shoshone automobile compactor and salvage yard. By 1977, Kagan had hand-built his octagonal "compound" in Chocolate Gulch near Ketchum which served as his studio, gallery and home and where he produced more than 1,000 sculptures over the course of his career. The mountainous landscape and the history of the region, both Native American history and Modernity, influenced the forms in his work. While being in nature, he would find abandoned mines whose industrial forms influenced his work. In 1978, he began working on his "Totem Series", which have become his most iconic works. In February of that year, he brought several of his works to Los Angeles and showed them in a gallery on La Cienaga Boulevard. Through the 1980s and '90s, his "Doric", "Ionic" and "Corinthian" and his "Reclining Lady" series continued to use historical themes while using his signature geometric shapes.

Kagan has sculptures in private and public collections throughout Idaho and the United States. The Boise Art Museum received nine of his works in 1984, most of which are on permanent display in the Museum's sculpture garden. Three of his totems, titled the "Boise Totems", were installed on the corners of 8th and Main in Boise, Idaho, in 1993, becoming icons of the city's downtown bar and restaurant scene. The Wilshire Boulevard Temple in Los Angeles commissioned a Chanukah Menorah from Kagan. In 1983 he was included in the Art from Idaho exhibition at the Smithsonian American Art Museum and in 1984 he was awarded a fellowship from the National Endowment for the Arts. In 1990 Kagan was a recipient of the Idaho Governor's Award for Excellence in the Arts.

Kagan was known for being soft-spoken and private, but also kind to both people and his artwork. He would travel around the country regularly to polish his sculptures in their various collections. Former Curator of Art Sandy Harthorne of the Boise Art Museum remembers he would come to the museum, almost without anyone knowing, and they'd see him in the sculpture garden cleaning his sculptures.

=== Death and afterward ===
Rod Kagan died on December 14, 2010, in Sun Valley after a short illness. After his death, there is still significant public interest in his work. The Ketchum City Arts Council has made efforts to place some of Kagan's sculptures on display in the downtown of the city as a way to honor both the artist and the arts in Idaho in general. In 2013, Northwest Nazarene University received #42 of Kagan's "Birthday Series", joining the eight other sculptures by Kagan on the campus. Boise State University in the same year acquired a six of his totems, valued at $108,000, that will be split between the University's new Fine Arts building and their Alumni Center.

Approximately 100 of Kagan's sculptures remain on display in the sculpture garden surrounding his compound in Chocolate Gulch near Ketchum which is open to the public.

== Artwork ==
"The columns have areas that are almost block like with openings that you can see through, stacked one on top the other," said Sandy Harthorne, former Curator of Art at the Boise Art Museum, "They have the sense of being a totem, but a very contemporary, very minimalist kind of totem sensibility." He once said he could see a finished piece in his mind and speak to it in his dreams. He would draw on the steel or bronze, creating shapes that would balance one on the other.
