= Eb Gaines =

American diplomat

Consul General of the United States in Bermuda
- In office 1989–1992
- Preceded by: James L. Medas
- Succeeded by: Robert Farmer

Personal details
- Born: April 21, 1927 West Virginia
- Died: March 15, 2012 (aged 84) San Francisco, California
- Party: Republican
- Spouse: Sheila Kellogg (1956–1995)

Ludwell Ebersole "Eb" Gaines Jr. (April 21, 1927 – March 15, 2012) was an American businessman and diplomat. Gaines was appointed the consul general to Bermuda by U.S. President George H. W. Bush in 1989. He served as the head of the American consulate in Hamilton, Bermuda, from 1989 until 1992.

== Biography ==
=== Early life ===
Gaines was born in Charleston, West Virginia, on April 21, 1927. He graduated from the Lawrenceville School, a private boarding school in Lawrenceville, New Jersey. He served on board the LST 636 in the United States Navy from 1944 to 1946 during World War II. Gaines received a bachelor's degree from Princeton University in 1951. He married his wife, the former Sheila Kellogg, who was from Libertyville, Illinois, in 1956. The family raised their four children around the United States, including New Jersey, Connecticut, Ohio, Illinois and the city of Ketchum, Idaho.

=== Business career ===
Gaines spent most of his career working in private sector. He held executive positions in the Plax Corporation, the Continental Can Company, and the American Arbitration Association. His resume included positions in American Arbitration Association from 1951 to 1953; the Chicago district manager for the Plax Corporation from 1953 to 1960; a metal sales manager for the Continental Can Company from 1960 to 1967; marketing manager for Nationwide Papers from 1967 to 1969; and the executive vice president and director for Diversa-Graphics from 1969 until 1972.

=== Overseas Private Investment Corporation ===
President Ronald Reagan appointed Gaines as the executive vice president of Overseas Private Investment Corporation in 1981.

=== U.S. Consul General to Bermuda ===
Gaines was appointed as Consul General to Bermuda by President George H. W. Bush in 1989. During his tenure, Gaines helped to organize the two bilateral American–British summits on Bermuda in 1990 and 1991 where President Bush held talks with Prime Minister Margaret Thatcher and her successor, Prime Minister John Major. Bermuda was an important strategic location for the United States during the 20th Century. Gaines' term as Consul General coincided with the end of the Cold War between the United States and the Soviet Union. The United States had a military presence on Bermuda for fifty years at the time. However, when the Soviet Union weakened and removed their ballistic missiles from the Atlantic, Bermuda lost its strategic importance. The American, Bermudan, and British governments began negotiations into the future of American troops on the Bermuda under Gaines. The U.S. military finally closed its bases, including the Naval Air Station Bermuda Annex, on Bermuda in 1995.

Former Premier of Bermuda John Swan credited Gaines for strengthening relations between Bermuda and the U.S. federal government, "Eb Gaines and his wife, Sheila, arrived in Bermuda during my tenure as Premier and immediately sought to enhance and foster the relationship between Bermuda and the United States.... Thus began a series of visits by high-ranking members of the Cabinet, members of Congress and other dignitaries. This strengthened relationship played a major role in the facility of the tax convention between Bermuda and the United States which has served us well with our insurance and reinsurance business." Gaines left office in 1992.

Eb Gaines died in San Francisco, California, on March 15, 2012, at the age of 84. He was survived by his four children—Eb III, Leith, Kellogg and Audrey—and three grandchildren, Riley, Simmons and Kellogg Jr. His wife, Sheila Gaines, died in November 1995.

== See also ==
- Bermuda–United States relations
