= Sun Valley Museum of Art =

Coordinates: 43°40′52″N 114°22′01″W

The Sun Valley Museum of Art (SVMoA) is the oldest arts organization in central Idaho’s Wood River Valley. Founded in 1971 as the Sun Valley Center for the Arts, the museum has grown from a few people presenting classes and events to an organization which has over 20,000 people attend events annually.

The museum's main gallery and staff offices are in Ketchum, Idaho, but SVMoA also operates a second location in Hailey, Idaho, to better serve the needs of the growing population of southern Blaine County. The Hailey location consists of a historic 100-year-old house that was the birthplace of the poet Ezra Pound and a newly built freestanding classroom.

In 2006, the Sun Valley Museum of Art received accreditation status from the American Alliance of Museums in recognition of its adherence to best practices of operation and programming. Only five percent of America's arts and cultural institutions share this distinction. The museum is a nonprofit, 501(c)(3) organization.

== Exhibitions and multidisciplinary programs ==
The Sun Valley Museum of Art is a non-collecting museum which holds three to four contemporary art exhibitions each year exploring timely, relevant artwork and ideas from multiple perspectives. The museum's curator, public programs, and learning & engagement directors work in tandem with the executive director to present multidisciplinary programming, including lectures, classes, and musical performances, alongside the visual arts exhibition in the gallery.

Recent exhibition focuses include art & healing, experiences of the supernatural, the relationship between art & synesthetic experience, and the impact of dams in the American West.

A partial list of artists whose work has been exhibited at the Museum in recent years includes Cecily Brown, Tina Barney, Emmet Gowin, Ionel Talpazan, Sebastião Salgado, Sheila Hicks, Joyce Kozloff, and George Nakashima. The museum organizes almost all of its exhibitions and has on occasion sent one of its exhibitions to other venues.

== Lectures and performing arts ==
The museum holds regular lectures and concert series which bring distinguished performers and thinkers to the Wood River Valley.

Notable persons hosted by the Sun Valley Museum of Art include David Sedaris, Pulitzer Prize-winning author Junot Díaz, former U.S. Health & Human Services Secretary Donna Shalala, activist Gloria Steinem, Henry Louis Gates, Mary Oliver, Barbara Ehrenreich, Terry Tempest Williams, and Maxine Hong Kingston.

Past performing artists have included the Shanghai Quartet, Jake Shimabukuro, Perla Batalla, Martin Hayes, Lura, and the Vienna Choir Boys. The museum often brings performing artists into local schools for performances, presentations, workshops and classes.

The museum's outdoor summer concerts typically feature popular names in rock, country, and blues. Past performers include Lyle Lovett, Chris Isaak, The Wood Brothers, Bonnie Raitt, Arlo Guthrie, Rosanne Cash, and Jonny Lang.

== Educational outreach ==
The museum works in partnership with other local nonprofit organizations and the Blaine County School District. Museum staff offer arts integration curriculum lesson plans, visit local K-12 classrooms, and host student exhibition tours. The museum offers after-school art classes in both English and Spanish to elementary and middle-school students. The Museum offers a variety of scholarships to local students and teachers, paid for mostly out of proceeds from the annual Sun Valley Wine Auction fundraising event.

== Sun Valley Wine Auction ==
The annual Sun Valley Wine Auction is the museum's main fundraiser. First held in 1981, it is the nation's oldest charity wine auction. It has been ranked among the nation's Top 10 Charity Wine Auctions by Wine Spectator magazine. During the multi-day auction in late June, events range from a live auction gala to a dozen vintner dinners at private homes. Public events include symposia at local wine bars. Recent featured wineries include Harlan Estate, Phifer Pavitt, Trefethen Family Vineyards, Paradigm, and Three Sticks. Recent guest chefs include Marc Murphy, Yann Nury, John Tesar, and Beau Macmillan.

== Sun Valley Arts & Crafts Festival ==
Until 2018, the museum presented the annual Sun Valley Arts & Crafts Festival. Now presented by Altitude Events Group, the festival attracts thousands of visitors and features over a hundred booths of fine arts and crafts, live music, artist demonstrations, and activities for kids.
