= Blaine County Courthouse =

Blaine County Courthouse may refer to:

- Blaine County Courthouse (Idaho), Hailey, Idaho
- Blaine County Courthouse (Oklahoma), Watonga, Oklahoma
