= Ketchum, Idaho =

- City
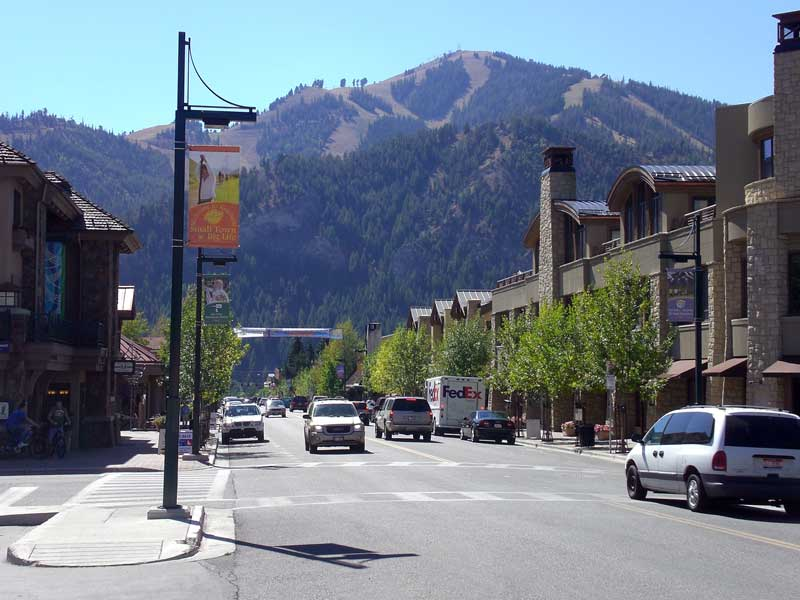
- Bald Mountain from Sun Valley Road (at Spruce Avenue) in September 2007
- Motto(s): "Small town, big life."
- Location of Ketchum in Blaine County, Idaho.

- Location within the United States Location within Idaho
- Coordinates: 43.68°N 114.365°W
- Country: United States
- State: Idaho
- County: Blaine
- Founded: 1880; 146 years ago

Area
  - Total: 3.25 sq mi (8.43 km^{2})
  - Land: 3.21 sq mi (8.31 km^{2})
  - Water: 0.046 sq mi (0.12 km^{2})
- Elevation: 5,804 ft (1,769 m)

Population (2020)
  - Total: 3,555
- Time zone: UTC-7 (Mountain (MST))
  - Summer (DST): UTC-6 (MDT)
- ZIP code: 83340
- Area codes: 208, 986
- FIPS code: 16-43030
- GNIS feature ID: 2411539
- Website: ketchumidaho.gov

Ketchum is a city in the western United States, located in Blaine County, Idaho. In the central part of the state, the population was 3,551 at the 2020 census, up from 2,689 in 2010. Located in the Wood River Valley, Ketchum is adjacent to Sun Valley and the communities share many resources: both sit in the same valley beneath Bald Mountain, with its skiing. The city also draws tourists to its fishing, hiking, trail riding, tennis, shopping, art galleries, and more. Air travel is through Friedman Memorial Airport in Hailey, approximately fifteen miles (24 km) south.

== History ==
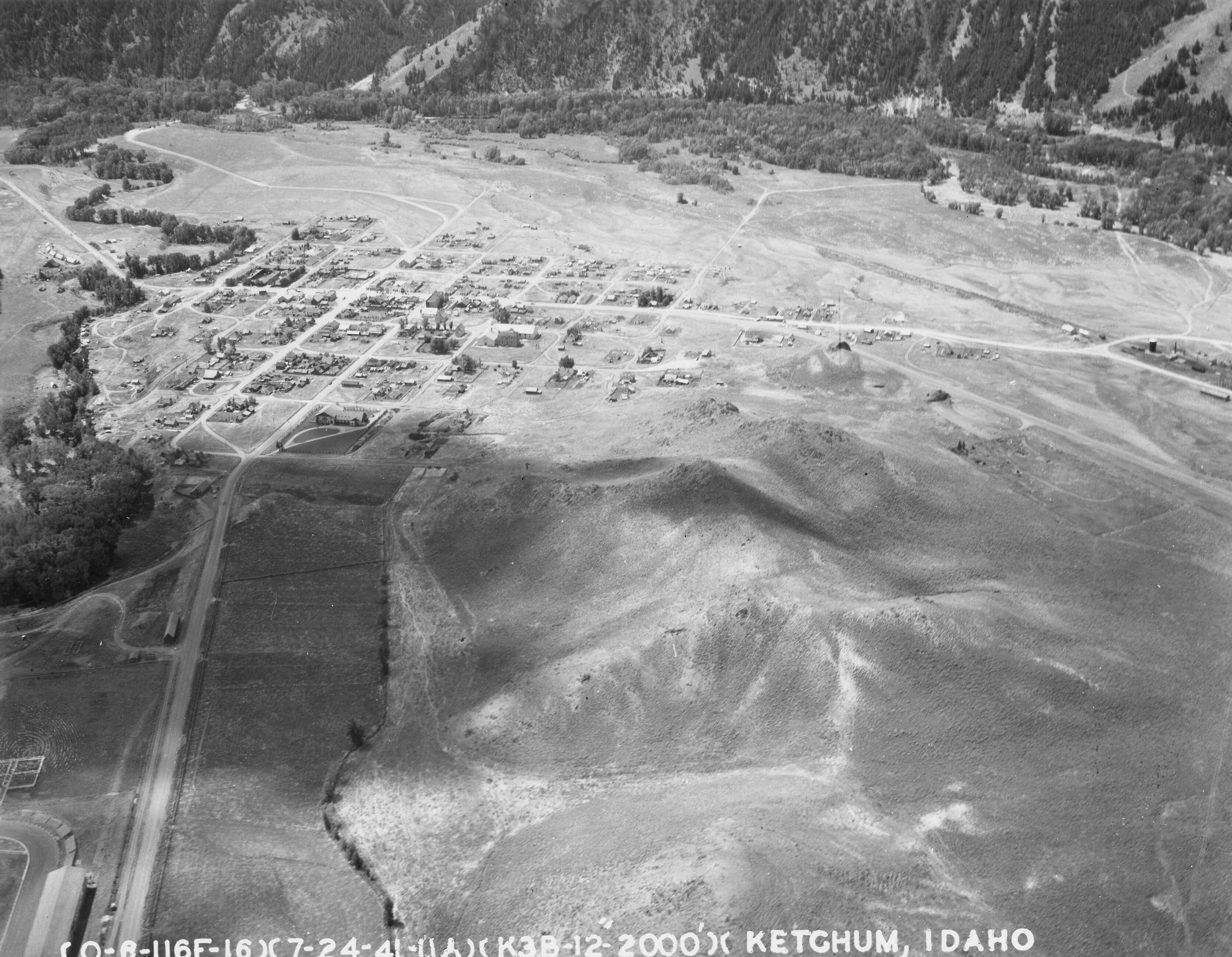
View of Ketchum, 1941

Originally the smelting center of the Warm Springs mining district, the town was first named Leadville in 1880. The postal department decided that was too common and renamed it for David Ketchum, a local trapper and guide who had staked a claim in the basin a year earlier. Smelters were built in the 1880s, with the Philadelphia Smelter, located on Warm Springs Road, processing large amounts of lead and silver for about a decade.

After the mining boom subsided in the 1890s, sheepmen from the south drove their flocks north through Ketchum in the summer, to graze in the upper elevation areas of the Pioneer, Boulder, and Sawtooth mountains. By 1920, Ketchum had become the largest sheep-shipping center in the West. In the fall, massive flocks of sheep flowed south into the town's livestock corrals at the Union Pacific Railroad's railhead, which connected to the main line at Shoshone.

After the development of Sun Valley by the Union Pacific Railroad in 1936, Ketchum became popular with celebrities, including Gary Cooper and Ernest Hemingway. Hemingway loved the surrounding area; he fished, hunted, and in the late 1950s bought a home overlooking the Big Wood River near the city. It was there he committed suicide; he and his wife Mary, his granddaughter, model and actress Margaux Hemingway, are buried in the Ketchum Cemetery. The local elementary school is named in his honor.

Every Labor Day weekend, Ketchum hosts the Wagon Days festival, a themed carnival featuring Old West wagon trains, narrow ore wagons, and a parade.

The Clint Eastwood film Pale Rider (1985) was partially filmed in the Boulder Mountains near Ketchum.

Ketchum is referenced in the song "Ketchum, ID" by indie rock band boygenius, as well as in the song "Motherfucker, I am Both: 'Amen' and 'Hallelujah'..." by experimental rock band Shearling

== Geography ==
Ketchum is located at an elevation of 5,853 feet (1,784 m) above sea level.

According to the United States Census Bureau, the city has a total area of 3.08 square miles (7.98 km^{2}), of which, 3.05 square miles (7.90 km^{2}) is land and 0.03 square miles (0.08 km^{2}) is water. However, two mountain streams, Trail Creek and Warm Springs Creek, join the Big Wood River in Ketchum.

=== Climate ===
According to the Köppen Climate Classification system, Ketchum has a warm-summer humid continental climate, abbreviated "Dsb" on climate maps. The hottest temperature recorded in Ketchum was 98 °F (36.7 °C) on July 13, 2002, while the coldest temperature recorded was −46 °F (−43.3 °C) on February 2, 1950.

Climate data for Ketchum, Idaho, 1991–2020 normals, extremes 1937–present
Month	Jan	Feb	Mar	Apr	May	Jun	Jul	Aug	Sep	Oct	Nov	Dec	Year
Record high °F (°C)	54 (12)	56 (13)	72 (22)	79 (26)	89 (32)	97 (36)	98 (37)	96 (36)	93 (34)	85 (29)	69 (21)	60 (16)	98 (37)
Mean maximum °F (°C)	43.1 (6.2)	47.1 (8.4)	56.3 (13.5)	68.7 (20.4)	77.6 (25.3)	83.8 (28.8)	90.2 (32.3)	88.7 (31.5)	82.3 (27.9)	72.6 (22.6)	58.1 (14.5)	43.8 (6.6)	90.9 (32.7)
Mean daily maximum °F (°C)	31.3 (−0.4)	35.0 (1.7)	42.6 (5.9)	51.9 (11.1)	61.6 (16.4)	69.7 (20.9)	80.0 (26.7)	78.7 (25.9)	69.0 (20.6)	55.9 (13.3)	41.2 (5.1)	30.3 (−0.9)	53.9 (12.2)
Daily mean °F (°C)	19.6 (−6.9)	23.1 (−4.9)	30.6 (−0.8)	39.4 (4.1)	48.2 (9.0)	54.8 (12.7)	62.6 (17.0)	61.1 (16.2)	52.6 (11.4)	41.8 (5.4)	29.3 (−1.5)	19.7 (−6.8)	40.2 (4.6)
Mean daily minimum °F (°C)	8.0 (−13.3)	11.1 (−11.6)	18.7 (−7.4)	26.9 (−2.8)	34.7 (1.5)	39.9 (4.4)	45.1 (7.3)	43.5 (6.4)	36.1 (2.3)	27.7 (−2.4)	17.4 (−8.1)	9.2 (−12.7)	26.5 (−3.0)
Mean minimum °F (°C)	−8.7 (−22.6)	−4.7 (−20.4)	3.5 (−15.8)	14.3 (−9.8)	22.7 (−5.2)	28.8 (−1.8)	34.9 (1.6)	33.3 (0.7)	24.5 (−4.2)	14.4 (−9.8)	1.9 (−16.7)	−7.1 (−21.7)	−11.6 (−24.2)
Record low °F (°C)	−42 (−41)	−46 (−43)	−28 (−33)	−4 (−20)	5 (−15)	17 (−8)	19 (−7)	16 (−9)	11 (−12)	−3 (−19)	−25 (−32)	−37 (−38)	−46 (−43)
Average precipitation inches (mm)	2.25 (57)	1.88 (48)	1.76 (45)	1.17 (30)	1.78 (45)	1.26 (32)	0.55 (14)	0.50 (13)	1.01 (26)	1.40 (36)	1.21 (31)	2.57 (65)	17.34 (442)
Average snowfall inches (cm)	27.0 (69)	17.2 (44)	10.5 (27)	3.2 (8.1)	0.2 (0.51)	0.0 (0.0)	0.0 (0.0)	0.0 (0.0)	0.0 (0.0)	1.6 (4.1)	10.3 (26)	32.0 (81)	102.0 (259)
Average extreme snow depth inches (cm)	31.1 (79)	33.4 (85)	31.9 (81)	14.8 (38)	0.5 (1.3)	0.0 (0.0)	0.0 (0.0)	0.0 (0.0)	0.0 (0.0)	1.0 (2.5)	7.3 (19)	20.4 (52)	36.5 (93)
Average precipitation days (≥ 0.01 in)	9.7	8.8	8.1	7.0	7.8	7.4	4.1	4.1	4.3	5.2	6.2	10.9	83.6
Average snowy days (≥ 0.1 in)	8.8	7.6	4.9	2.2	0.2	0.0	0.0	0.0	0.0	0.7	3.7	9.9	38.0
Source 1: NOAA
Source 2: National Weather Service

== Demographics ==
Historical population
Census	Pop.	Note	%±
1890	450		—
1950	757		—
1960	746		−1.5%
1970	1,454		94.9%
1980	2,200		51.3%
1990	2,523		14.7%
2000	3,003		19.0%
2010	2,689		−10.5%
2020	3,555		32.2%
U.S. Decennial Census

Ketchum is home to several faith communities, including the Presbyterian Church of the Bigwood, St. Thomas Episcopal Church, Our Lady of the Snows Catholic Church, and the Wood River Jewish Community.

=== 2020 census ===
As of the 2020 census, Ketchum had a population of 3,555. The median age was 50.8 years. 12.7% of residents were under the age of 18 and 27.0% of residents were 65 years of age or older. For every 100 females there were 99.9 males, and for every 100 females age 18 and over there were 98.5 males age 18 and over.

100.0% of residents lived in urban areas, while 0.0% lived in rural areas.

There were 1,899 households in Ketchum, of which 15.6% had children under the age of 18 living in them. Of all households, 37.4% were married-couple households, 25.8% were households with a male householder and no spouse or partner present, and 28.4% were households with a female householder and no spouse or partner present. About 43.4% of all households were made up of individuals and 16.4% had someone living alone who was 65 years of age or older.

There were 3,659 housing units, of which 48.1% were vacant. The homeowner vacancy rate was 3.5% and the rental vacancy rate was 19.6%.

Racial composition as of the 2020 census
Race	Number	Percent
White	3,191	89.8%
Black or African American	5	0.1%
American Indian and Alaska Native	3	0.1%
Asian	46	1.3%
Native Hawaiian and Other Pacific Islander	2	0.1%
Some other race	92	2.6%
Two or more races	216	6.1%
Hispanic or Latino (of any race)	200	5.6%

=== 2010 census ===
At the 2010 census there were 2,689 people, 1,431 households, and 583 families living in the city. The population density was 881.6 inhabitants per square mile (340.4/km^{2}). There were 3,564 housing units at an average density of 1,168.5 units per square mile (451.2 units/km^{2}). The racial makeup of the city was 90.9% White, 0.1% African American, 0.1% Native American, 1.3% Asian, 6.5% from other races, and 1.0% from two or more races. Hispanic or Latino of any race were 9.1%.

Of the 1,431 households 15.7% had children under the age of 18 living with them, 33.2% were married couples living together, 5.0% had a female householder with no husband present, 2.6% had a male householder with no wife present, and 59.3% were non-families. 44.1% of households were one person and 11.5% were one person aged 65 or older. The average household size was 1.88 and the average family size was 2.63.

The median age was 44 years. 14.3% of residents were under the age of 18; 5.8% were between the ages of 18 and 24; 31.4% were from 25 to 44; 32.3% were from 45 to 64; and 16.3% were 65 or older. The gender makeup of the city was 52.0% male and 48.0% female.

=== 2000 census ===
At the 2000 census there were 3,003 people, 1,582 households, and 607 families living in the city. The population density was 991.4 inhabitants per square mile (382.8/km^{2}). There were 2,920 housing units at an average density of 964.0 units per square mile (372.2 units/km^{2}). The racial makeup of the city was 94.74% White, 0.27% Native American, 0.57% Asian, 0.17% Pacific Islander, 2.33% from other races, and 1.93% from two or more races. Hispanic or Latino of any race were 4.90%.

Of the 1,582 households 14.2% had children under the age of 18 living with them, 30.1% were married couples living together, 5.6% had a female householder with no husband present, and 61.6% were non-families. 42.2% of households were one person and 6.8% were one person aged 65 or older. The average household size was 1.90 and the average family size was 2.60.

The age distribution was 12.5% under the age of 18, 9.4% from 18 to 24, 37.6% from 25 to 44, 31.1% from 45 to 64, and 9.4% 65 or older. The median age was 39 years. For every 100 females, there were 116.2 males. For every 100 females age 18 and over, there were 117.1 males.

The median household income was $45,457 and the median family income was $73,750. Males had a median income of $31,712 versus $27,857 for females. The per capita income for the city was $41,798. About 3.5% of families and 8.9% of the population were below the poverty line, including 10.9% of those under age 18 and 6.6% of those age 65 or over.

== Education ==
Blaine County School District is the school district for the entire county. The zoned schools are Ernest Hemingway STEAM School (for K-5), Wood River Middle School, and Wood River High School.

The county is in the catchment area, but not the taxation zone, for College of Southern Idaho.

== Notable people ==
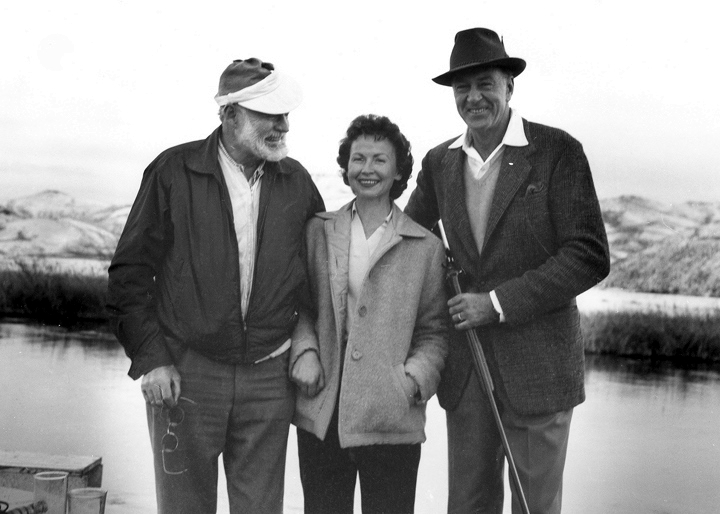
Ernest Hemingway bird-hunting near Picabo, Idaho in January 1959. With him are Gary Cooper and Bobbie Powell

- Melissa Arnot - mountain guide
- Bowe Bergdahl, United States Army soldier captured by the Taliban
- Alan Blinken, businessman, political candidate, and former United States Ambassador to Belgium
- Peter Cetera, musician and original member of Chicago
- Christin Cooper - alpine ski racer
- Dick Dorworth, ski racer and coach
- Carl B. Feldbaum, author, businessman, and lawyer
- Richard Feldman, cyclist
- Dick Fosbury, Olympic Gold Medalist, high jumper
- Karl Fostvedt, freeskier
- Gretchen Fraser - alpine ski racer, first US winter Olympic Gold medalist
- Eb Gaines, businessman and diplomat
- Scott Glenn, actor
- Frank R. Gooding, politician; 7th governor of Idaho
- John Steel Hagenbuch, Olympic cross-country skier
- Tom Hanks, Oscar winning actor
- Ernest Hemingway - Nobel Prize-winning author and outdoorsman
- Mariel Hemingway - Academy Award-nominated actress, granddaughter of Ernest Hemingway
- Wendy Jaquet, former member of the Idaho House of Representatives
- Rod Kagan, artist
- Cody Lampl, professional hockey player
- Maia Makhateli, ballet dancer
- Steve Miller - rock musician ("Steve Miller Band")
- Carson Palmer - Heisman Trophy winner and former NFL football player
- William N. Panzer, television and film producer
- Denne Bart Petitclerc, journalist and television producer
- Tim Ryan - sportscaster
- Melvin Schwartz, Nobel Prize-winning physicist
- Jim Sinegal - partial year; founder and former CEO of Costco Wholesale
- Ann Sothern, actress
- Clint Stennett, former member of the Idaho Legislature
- Michelle Stennett, member and Minority Leader of the Idaho Senate
- Picabo Street - Olympic and world champion ski racer
- Ed Viesturs - only American to climb all 14 eight thousand meter peaks
- Adam West - actor, TV's Batman
- Van Williams – actor, TV's Green Hornet
- Steve Wynn - partial year; founder and former CEO of Wynn Resorts

== Points of interest ==
- Sawtooth Botanical Garden
- Wood River Museum of History and Culture
- The Community Library
- Sawtooth National Recreation Area
- Sun Valley's Bald Mountain or "Baldy" has 13 chairlifts and 65 runs. It covers 2,054 acres (8.31 km^{2}) and has 3,400 feet (1,000 m) of vertical from top to bottom.

== Special events ==
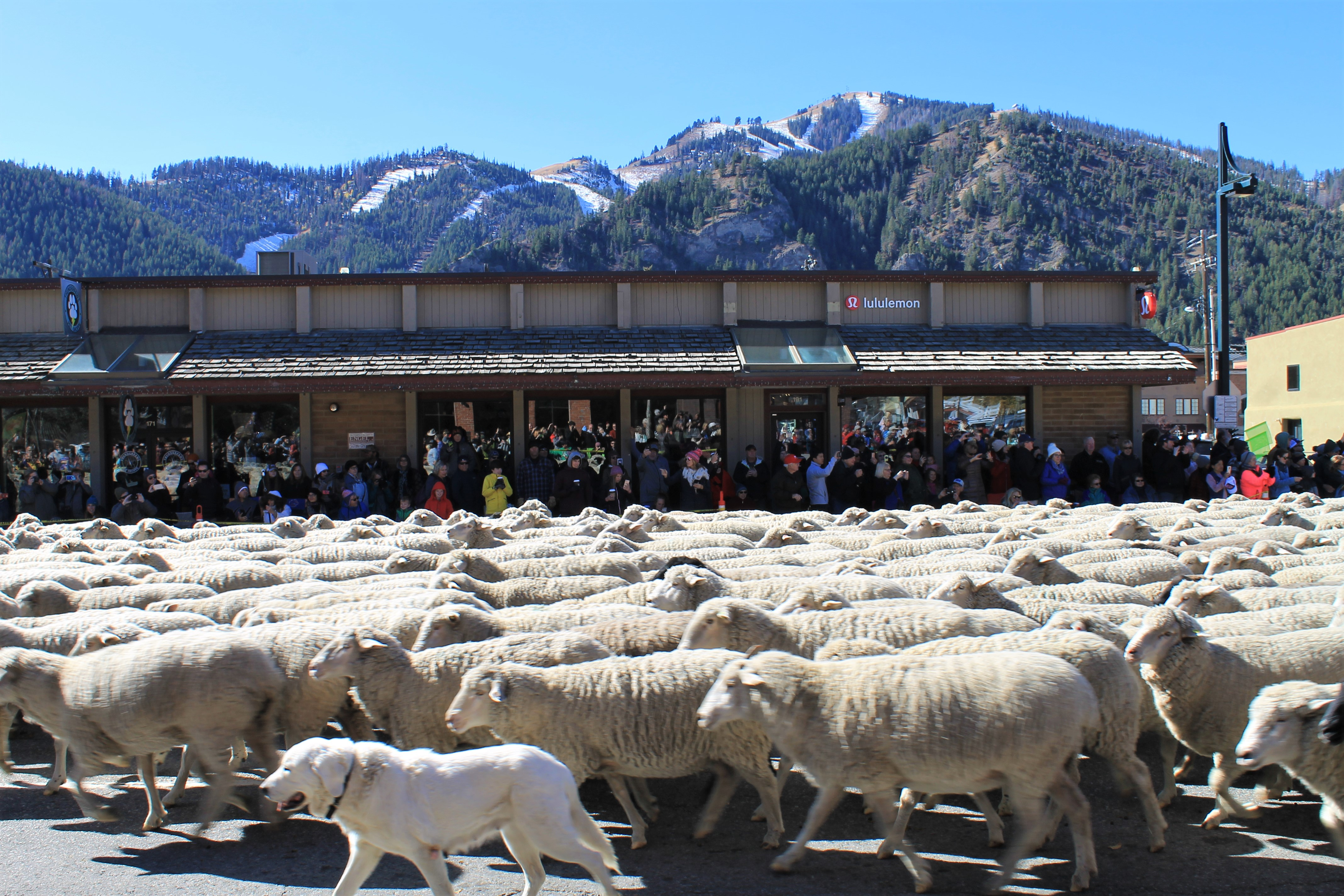
Trailing of the Sheep Parade 2018

- Trailing of the Sheep
- Ride Sun Valley Bike Festival
- Sun Valley Jazz Festival
- Sun Valley Summer Symphony
- Wagon Days
- Sun Valley Film Festival
- TEDxSunValley

== Sister cities ==
Ketchum has two sister cities, as designated by Sister Cities International:

- Lignano Sabbiadoro, Italy
- Tegernsee, Germany
