= Sanford Smith =

Sanford Smith may refer to:

- Sanford L. Smith (1939–2024), American businessman
- Sanford W. Smith (1869–1929), American lawyer and politician
