= Don't Look at Me the Way a Dog Might Look at Your Leg =

EP by Shearling
- Released: July 31, 2026
- Genres: Gothic folk; experimental rock; post-rock; noise rock
- Length: 33:22
- Label: Mishap
- Producer: Alexander Kent

Shearling chronology
Motherfucker, I am Both: "Amen" and "Hallelujah"... (2025)	Don't Look at Me the Way a Dog Might Look at Your Leg (2026)

Singles from Don't Look at Me the Way a Dog Might Look at Your Leg
- 1. "Believe Me (Dust)" Released: July 24, 2026

Don't Look at Me the Way a Dog Might Look at Your Leg is the debut extended play by the American experimental rock band Shearling. It was released on July 31, 2026, via Mishap Records. The record was announced alongside the single "Believe Me (Dust)", released on July 24, 2026.

The record partially contains material previously performed live by frontman Alex Kent during a solo tour under the moniker Big Brown Cow. It was described by the band as a "step-adjacent" towards the band's promised "sister" album to their debut studio album, Motherfucker, I am Both: "Amen" and "Hallelujah".... Starting on September 1, 2026, Shearling embarked on a nation-wide tour.

== Reception ==
Andrew Sacher of BrooklynVegan described the EP as similarly towering to their debut, noting a "brooding mix" of gothic folk, experimental rock, and post-rock, comparing the project to artists such as Swans, Nick Cave, Slint, and Godspeed You! Black Emperor. Moreover, they also note that while many moments on the record veer into "nails-on-a-chalkboard" noise rock, the album similarly has softer moments that could be called pretty.

J. Kreuger of Consequence highlighted "Believe Me (Dust)" as his song of the week, denoting a similarity to Alex Kent's previous band Sprain's slowcore-influenced debut EP. Further, similarly citing influences of gothic folk as well as Swans, Slint, and Godspeed You! Black Emperor.

== Track listing ==
All tracks are written by Alexander Kent.

Don't Look at Me the Way a Dog Might Look at Your Leg track listing
No.	Title	Length
1.	"Three Pebbles (Saltlick)"	8:09
2.	"Believe Me (Dust)"	5:02
3.	"Surely You Know by Now"	4:03
4.	"Young Man in Idaho"	3:49
5.	"Your Reward"	12:19
Total length:		33:22

== Personnel ==
Credited are adapted from Bandcamp.

=== Shearling ===
- Alexander Kent – vocals, engineering, production, collage art design, guitar, synthesizer, trombone, samples, autoharp, drum machine, hammered dulcimer, banjo, percussion, organ, Mellotron
- Wesley Nelson – bass, upright bass
- Sylvie Simmons – guitar, balalaika, gamelan, Baoding balls
- Elizabeth Carver – samples, vibraphone, Mellotron, pump organ, banjo, hammered dulcimer
- Andrew Chanover – drums

=== Additional personnel ===
- Rachel Kennedy – background vocals
- Karl McComas-Reichl – cello
- Sorrel Perrone – pedal steel
- Cleo Henman – engineering, mixing, mastering
- Carter French – engineering
- Scott Evans – mixing
- Shadrach Tuck – photos, illustrations, art layout design

== Charts ==
Chart performance for Don't Look at Me the Way a Dog Might Look at Your Leg
Chart (2026)	Peak position
UK Album Downloads (Official Charts)	52
