= Karl Fostvedt =

American Freeskier from Ketchum, Idaho

Personal information
- Born: Ketchum, Idaho, U.S.

Sport
- Sport: Skiing
- Updated on November 2024

Karl Fostvedt is an American Freeskier from Ketchum, Idaho. He is sponsored by Dakine, K2 Skis, Anon Optics (a sub-brand of Burton Snowboards), and CAST Touring. He is known for his urban, backcountry, and big mountain skiing abilities.

He has been featured in movies by D.O.S. Media, 4bi9 Media, Toy Soldier Productions, Poor Boyz Productions, Teton Gravity Research, and others. During the 2009-2010 Winter Karl competed in the Dew Tour slopestyle competition. He competed as an invited athlete at War of Rails winning the contest in 2014. In September 2012 he won the IF3 International Freeski Film Festival (IF3) Rookie of the Year award for his segment in the Red Bull Media House and Poor Boyz Productions produced film WE: A Collection of Individuals. The following year, he led a group of skiers to Detroit, Michigan to film an urban ski segment for the 2013 film, "Tracing Skylines". The Detroit segment of the film received attention worldwide with the video being watched over 750,000 times on YouTube as of Nov 30, 2023. With the success of the Detroit segment, the following year he went to Sarajaveo to ski the ruins of the 1984 Winter Olympics. With the success of these films, his profile continued to grow.

Fostvedt's transition from primarily being known for his urban abilities to establishing himself as one of the best backcountry and big mountain skiing was completed in 2018 when he won the inaugural Kings and Queens of Corbet's Competition. He would go on to finish 2nd the following year and then winning again in 2021. During this time his segments in ski films were primarily filmed at big mountain locations including Alaska, Japan, Chile, British Columbia, and Idaho. In December 2021, Fostvedt was named the Idaho Mountain Express's 'Athlete of the Year' for 2021 with the newspaper editor's saying "it was the easiest choice we’ve made all year".

In 2021, Fostvedt established his own production company, Native Earth Productions, to start creating his own films. His first film "Brap Ski - Volume One" combined two of his passions, snowmobiling and skiing, in order to find backcountry terrain that would otherwise be inaccessible. The success of "Brap Ski 1" has led to three follow-on films, "Brap Ski 2", "Brap Ski 3", and "Brap Ski 4".

== Awards ==
- 1st Place - 2021 Kings and Queens of Corbet's
- 2nd Place - 2019 Kings and Queens of Corbet's
- 1st Place - 2018 Kings and Queens of Corbet's
- 1st Place - 2014 War of Rails at Bear Mountain
- Nominated - 2013 Powder Award - Best Manmade Air
- Won - 2012 IF3 Rookie of the Year

== Freeskiing movies ==
- "Return to Send'er", Matchstick Media Productions
- Collab, D.O.S. Media
- Set Your Sights, Toy Soldier Productions
- Act Natural, Toy Soldier Productions
- WE: A Collection of Individuals, Red Bull Media House, in association with Poor Boyz Productions
- Keep Looking, 4bi9 Media
- Tracing Skylines, Red Bull Media House, in association with Poor Boyz Productions
- Make Believe, Teton Gravity Research
