= Horace Greeley Knapp =

American architect

Horace Greeley Knapp was an American architect.

He had been established as an architect for 20 years but was "still quite a young man" in 1894, when profiled in a directory of New York City.

He was born in rural Rockland County, New York.

Several of his works are listed on the National Register of Historic Places (NRHP).

Works include:

- Bennett Deyrup House (1887), 309 N Broadway, Upper Nyack, NY
- American Federation of Human Rights Headquarters (1919-1924), 9070 S. Douglas Blvd. Larkspur, Colorado, NRHP-listed
- Blaine County Courthouse (Hailey, Idaho), 1st and Croy Sts. Hailey, Idaho, NRHP-listed
- Homer Pound House, 314 2nd Ave., S. Hailey, Idaho, NRHP-listed
- Wells Building, Buffalo, New York
- Taylor's Theater and Office Building, Buffalo, New York
- Real Estate Exchange Building, Buffalo, New York
- "Gray Crags" on the Palisades, New York, built for W. S. Opdyke.

He was described as an architect of New York City, with offices at 335 Broadway, in 1919 when he designed the AFHR headquarters building in Colorado.

In 1894 his offices were at 106 and 108 Fulton Street.
