= Sawtooth Botanical Garden =

Botanical garden in Ketchum, Idaho

Coordinates: 43.628877°N 114.349875°W

The Sawtooth Botanical Garden (5 acres) is a high-altitude botanical garden located off Highway 75 at 11 Gimlet Road, Ketchum, Idaho, United States. It is open to the public.

== History ==
The garden was founded in 1994. It includes a stream-side garden, ornamental garden, xeriscape garden, research area, a greenhouse (1550 square feet) displaying flowering perennials, herbs, and vines, and a main building.

In August 2005, a new garden was constructed, the Garden of Infinite Compassion, designed by landscape designer Martin Mosko, a Zen Buddhist monk and abbot of the Hakubai Temple in Boulder, Colorado. It is an alpine garden with osteospurmum, arabis, arnica, alpine asters, poppies, orchids, columbine, and Lewisii, set with a waterfall, reflecting pond, and 16 rocks of up to 30 tons each, representing the 16 Buddhist arhats. The garden was built for a visit from the 14th Dalai Lama on September 13, 2005, who blessed the garden and a finely carved 400 pound Tibetan prayer wheel filled with over one million written mantras. This is one of only two such prayer wheels to be erected in the United States. Rather unusually, the prayer wheel is turned by the stream rather than by hand.

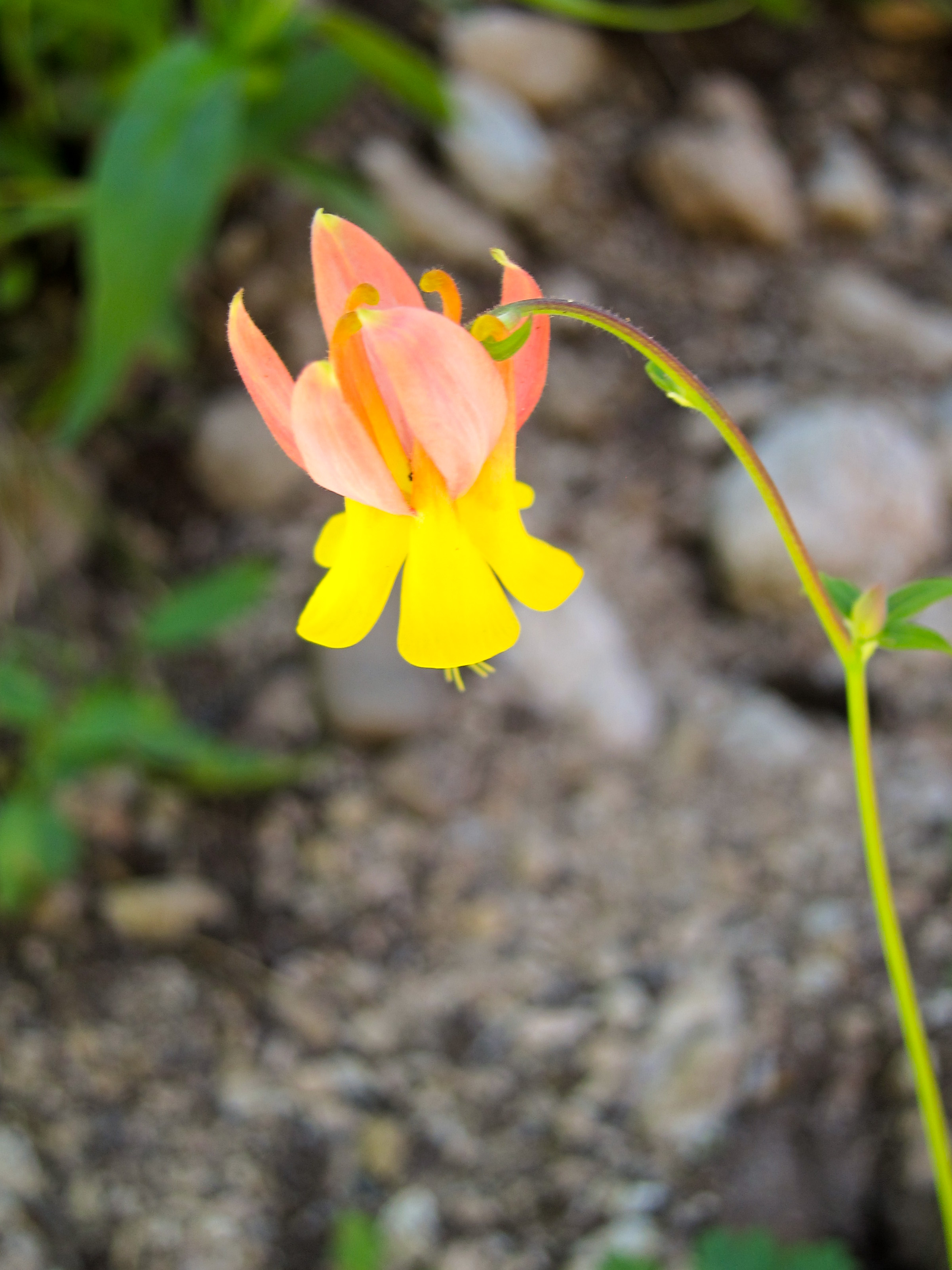
Sawtooth Botanical Garden

== See also ==
- List of botanical gardens in the United States
