= Homer Pound House =

Historic house in Idaho, United States

- U.S. National Register of Historic Places
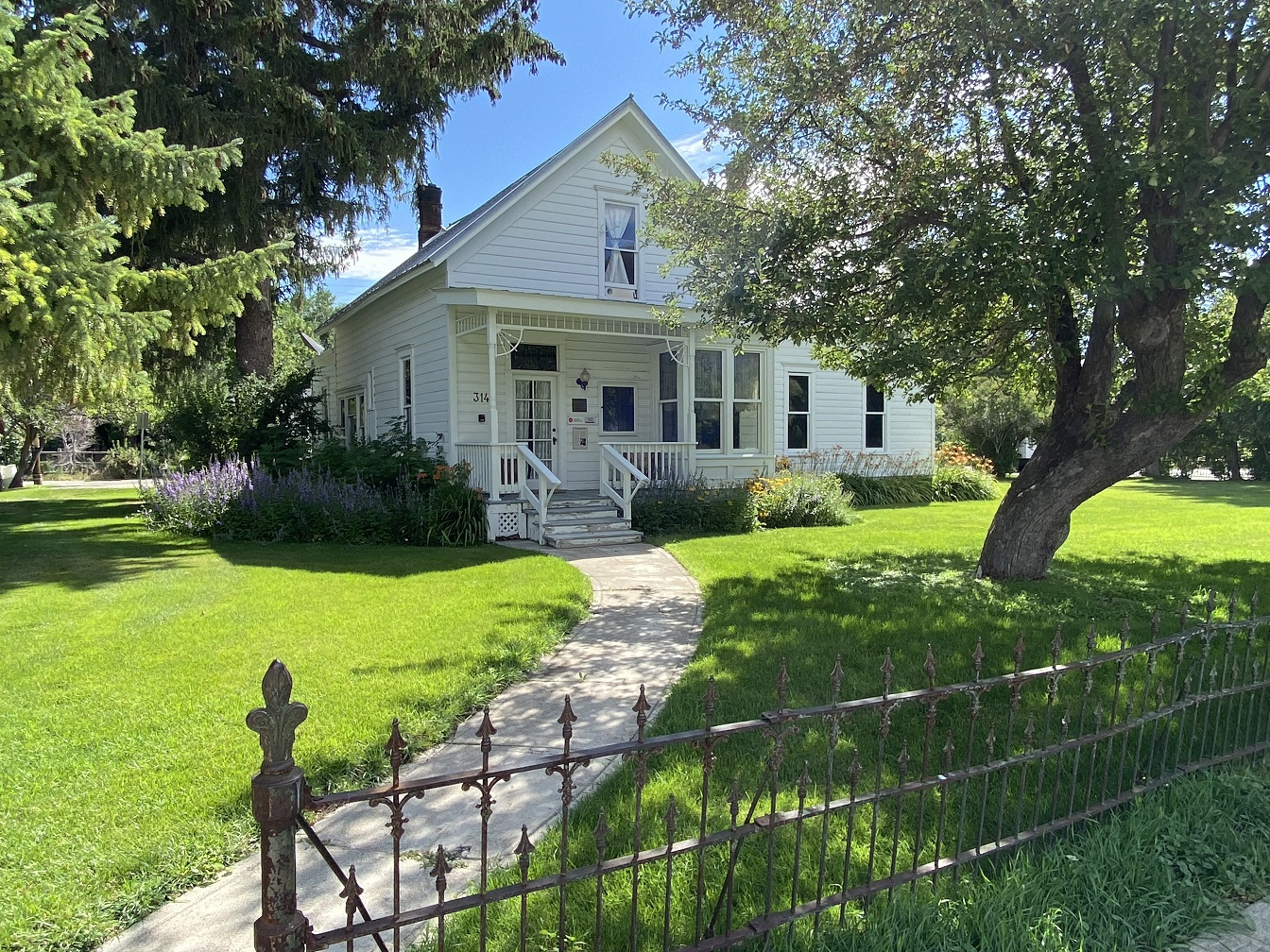
- Homer Pound House in 2023

- Location within Idaho Location within the United States
- Location: 314 2nd Ave., S. Hailey, Idaho
- Coordinates: 43°31′5.4″N 114°18′38.4″W
- Area: less than one acre
- Built: 1884
- Built by: Horace Greeley Knapp
- NRHP reference No.: 78001051
- Added to NRHP: December 28, 1978

The Homer Pound House, at 314 2nd Ave., S., in Hailey, Idaho, is a historic house that is listed on the National Register of Historic Places. It is significant as the birthplace of the poet Ezra Pound (1885–1972), who was born there on October 30, 1885, when Hailey was part of the Idaho Territory. Ezra was the only child of Homer Loomis Pound (1858–1942) and Isabel Weston (1860–1948). Homer's father was Thaddeus Coleman Pound (1832–1914), who was a Republican congressman for northwest Wisconsin and who had made and lost a fortune in the lumber business. Homer worked for Thaddeus until Thaddeus secured him an appointment as registrar of the government land office in Hailey, a post in which he served from 1883 to 1887.

The house was built in 1883 or 1884 and was a work of Horace Greeley Knapp. It was later the home of the local journalist Roberta McKercher until 1996. The house was gifted to the Sun Valley Center for the Arts in 2005.

The house was listed on the National Register in 1978. It is a modest one-and-a-half-story house with shiplap siding. The cast-iron fence on the property's south and east sides is noted to be "one of the better preserved examples of its genre in Idaho."
