= Bermuda–United States relations =

- Bermuda: United States

The United Kingdom is formally responsible for Bermuda's foreign and defense policy. American policy toward the United Kingdom is the basis of US–Bermudian relations. In the early 20th century, as modern transportation and communication systems developed, Bermuda became a popular destination for wealthy American, British, and Canadian tourists. While the tariff enacted in 1930 by the US against its trading partners ended Bermuda's once-thriving agricultural export trade – primarily fresh vegetables to the US, it helped spur the overseas territory to develop its tourist industry, which is second only to international business in terms of economic importance to the island.

== History ==
During World War II, Bermuda became a significant United States Armed Forces site because of its location in the Atlantic Ocean. In 1941, the US signed a lend-lease agreement with the UK giving the British surplus US Navy destroyers in exchange for 99-year lease rights to establish naval and air bases in Bermuda. The bases consisted of 5.8 square kilometers (2.2 sq mi) of land largely reclaimed from the sea. The US Naval Air Station was on St. David's Island, while the US Naval Air Station Annex was at the western end of the island in the Great Sound.

Both bases were closed in September 1995 (as were British and Canadian bases), and the lands were formally returned to the Government of Bermuda in 2002.

The Government of Bermuda has begun to pursue some international initiatives independent of the UK in recent years.

An estimated 8,500 US citizens live in Bermuda, many employed in the international business community. Many American businesses are also incorporated in Bermuda, although no figures are available. Despite the trend of American companies moving to Bermuda or other offshore jurisdictions to escape US taxes, Bermuda maintains that the island is not a "tax haven" and that it taxes both local and foreign businesses equally.

While US visitors to Bermuda are critical to the island's tourism industry, the number of US visitors to Bermuda is declining. In 2006 only 76% of air arrivals originated from the US compared to 83.9% in 1990. The number of air and cruise passengers from the US totaled 464,000 in 2000. That number fell to 451,924 American passengers in 2006, however in 2023, this figure is 625,000.

In 2005, 74% of Bermuda's imports came from the US. Areas of opportunity for US investors are in the re-insurance and financial services industries, although the former US base lands may also present long-term investment opportunities. In 2023, that number has increased to 80%.

== Principal US Officials ==
- Consul General – Karen Grissette

== Diplomatic missions ==
The US Consulate General is located just outside Hamilton, the capital of Bermuda.
