= Charles Steffen =

American artist

Charles Steffen (1927–1995) was an American self-taught artist from Chicago, Illinois. He belongs to the outsider art movement and is known for his drawings of an imaginary world "peopled by creatures resembling aliens."

== Life ==
Steffen was born into a family of eight children in Chicago. He studied drawing, art history, and photography at the Illinois Institute of Technology in the late 1940s. Around 1950, while still in school, he suffered a mental breakdown and was institutionalized at Elgin State Hospital between 1952 and 1963, undergoing treatments and electroshock therapy for schizophrenia. He continued to make art while institutionalized.

After leaving the hospital, unable to take a job, Steffen moved into his childhood home with his sister, Rita. Steffen spent most of his time drawing, mainly on brown wrapping paper, with graphite and colored-pencils.

When the family house was sold upon his mother's death in 1994, Steffen moved into a small room in a men's retirement home in northern Chicago. Previously, Rita had instructed him to destroy his piles of drawings now and then, believing them to be a fire hazard. Upon his move, Steffen was prepared to throw away a vast body of drawings but instead gave pieces to his nephew, Christopher Preissing, who had shown interest in his work. They were discovered in storage around 2006, which coincided with renewed public awareness of Outsider art.

Forty years of drawing and smoking had gnarled his body and given his voice a gravelly quality. Before he died, this voice was captured in a recording was made of him reading "Jabberwocky" from Lewis Carroll's Through the Looking-Glass, and What Alice Found There (1872), a book both dear and inspirational to him.

== Work ==
As art, Steffen created drawings for his own personal pleasure, working with brown paper bags and colored pencils, and at the rate of one to three drawings a day. All of the work that the artist created before 1989 has been destroyed.

His drawings derive mostly from memory, his brief art school education, and from within his limited sphere of existence (when not drawing, Steffen spent his time pacing the house while smoking or drinking). His personal, more quotidian subject matter included: the bank teller, neighbors, plants from the yard, etc. Beyond this immediate sphere, Steffen's subject matter extended to the past and the general: his mother, her wheelchair and bed; showgirls from the bar he frequented during his school days; scenes from Elgin, Illinois; a woman he had loved before his hospitalization; female nudes and crucifixions.

Steffen experimented with his repeated subject matter; he began to merge the human form with plants or with the abstract tobacco stains and tar splotches he saw on neighborhood sidewalks. His human figures began to merge as well, encompassing both male and female characteristics. In his later years, Steffen wrote notes in the margins of the drawings. His notes varied from thanks to God, to recollections and observations, to the mundane (what he had just eaten, how much he paid for art supplies, etc.). The following is an excerpt from the text on Alisha Nude from 1994: "I'm an art school drop out stoped [sic] going to classes, became mentally ill, spent foreteen [sic] years in elgin state hos, made crayon drawing of the men on the ward, good, small, nice, I wish I had them, I wish I was dead, chas."

== Exhibitions ==
- 2006: Russell Bowman Art Advisory, Chicago, Illinois
- 2008: Galerie Objet Trouvé, Paris; Russell Bowman Art Advisory, Chicago, Illinois
- 2010: Life Lines: The Drawings of Charles Steffen, Intuit: The Center for Intuitive and Outsider Art, Chicago
- 2012: Galerie Christian Berst, Paris
- 2013: Collection de L'Art Brut, Lausanne, Switzerland
- 2024: 1995, A Lesson In Life Drawing, MARCH, New York, New York

== Sources ==
- Information page on artnet.com
- Écrits d'Art Brut. Graphomanes extravagants, Lucienne Peiry, Paris, Le Seuil, 2020. ISBN 978-2-02-144768-2
- Bonesteel, Michael. The Art of Charles Steffen, Raw Vision, Spring 2008. Retrieved 2012-01-21.
- Brody, David, artcritical.com, February 24, 2010
- Charles Steffen Bio, Intuit: The Center for Intuitive and Outsider Art
- Glueck, Grace. "Art in Review," The New York Times, Jan. 26
- Johnson, Ken (January 29, 2010). "Art in Review: Charles Steffen". The New York Times.
- "Lifelines: The Drawings of Charles Steffen," Resource Library
- The New Yorker, February 15 & 22
- Srdanovic, Sonja. "Masters of Self-Taught Art," ArtSlant Chicago, 2009
- Stillman, Nick. "Charles Steffen," Artforum, Summer 2007
- Westin, Monica. "Two Important Shows at Intuit, Transvestite Fights, and Fantasies of Outsider Art." Huffington Post Chicago, July 14, 2010
