= Viktor Bokov =

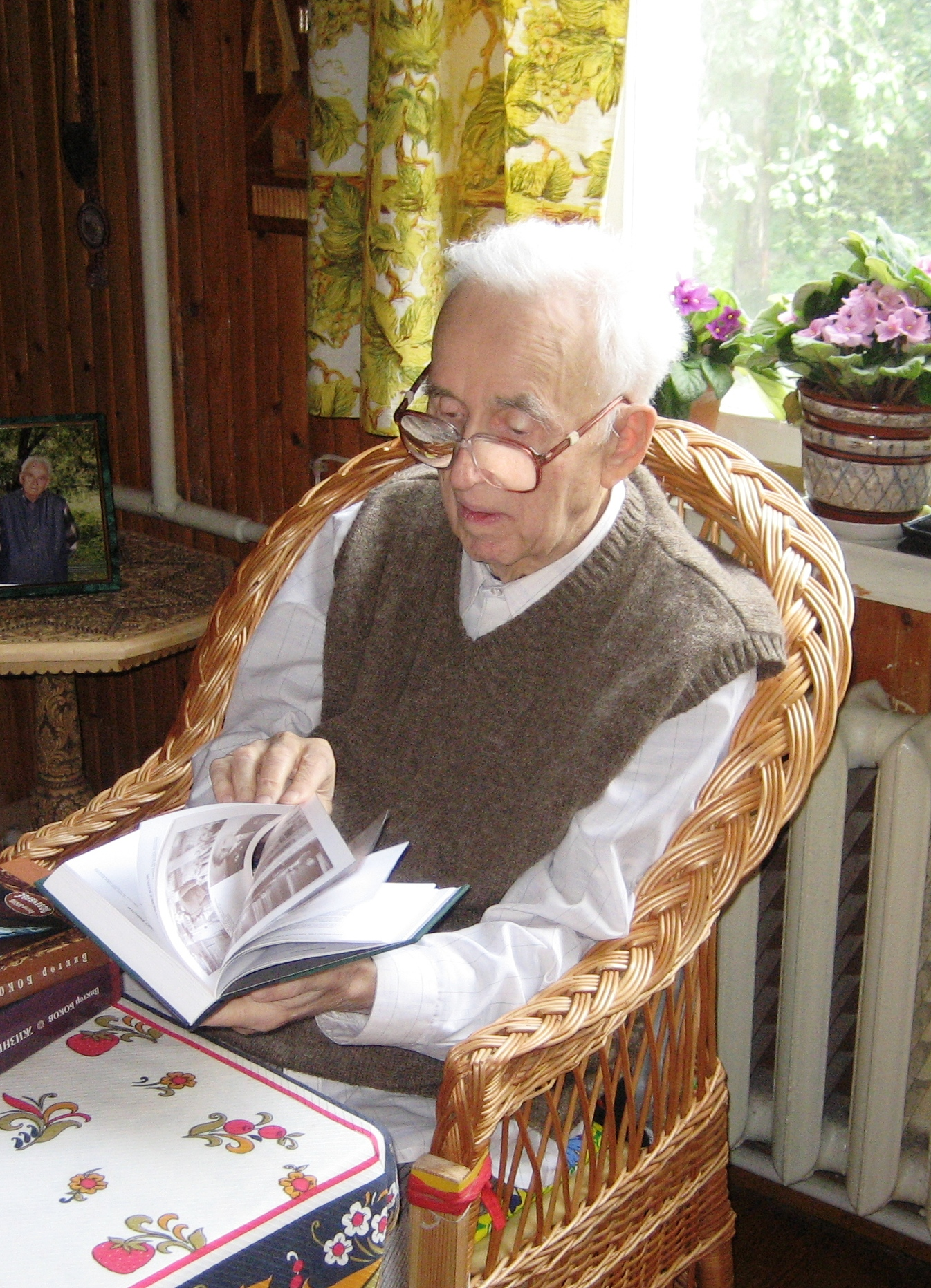
- Viktor Bokov in 2007
- Born: Viktor Fyodorovich Bokov; 6 September 1914; Vladimir Oblast
- Died: October 15, 2009 (aged 95); Moscow
- Occupations: Poet and writer

Viktor Fyodorovich Bokov (Russian: Ви́ктор Фёдорович Бо́ков; 6 (19) September 1914 — 15 October 2009) was a Russian and Soviet poet, writer, and collector of folklore.

His son is the artist Konstantin Bokov who immigrated to the United States in 1975.

== See also ==
- List of Russian-language poets
