= Shearling (band) =

American post-rock band

- Origin: Los Angeles, California, U.S.
- Genres: Experimental rock; post-rock; noise rock
- Years active: 2024–present
- Label: Mishap
- Spinoff of: Sprain
- Members: Alexander Kent; Sylvie Simmons; Andrew Chanover; Wesley Nelson; Elizabeth Carver

Shearling is an American experimental rock band from Los Angeles, California, formed in 2024 by vocalist/multi-instrumentalist Alexander Kent and multi-instrumentalist Sylvie Simmons. Following the 2023 disbandment of the pair's previous group, Sprain, Kent and Simmons recruited bassist Wesley Nelson and drummer Andrew Chanover to fill out the line-up, with multi-instrumentalist Elizabeth Carver joining the band in 2025.

Shearling released their debut studio album, Motherfucker, I am Both: "Amen" and "Hallelujah"..., in 2025 via Mishap Records, followed by their first extended play, Don't Look at Me the Way a Dog Might Look at Your Leg, in 2026.

== History ==
Following the disbandment of Sprain (which occurred a month after the release of their last album The Lamb as Effigy), two of its members, Alexander Kent and Sylvie Simmons, continued where the band left off by taking their then-unfinished material and refining it with an almost entirely new lineup under the name of Shearling.

Shearling announced their formation in July 2024 and stated that they were working on their debut album. They performed a debut show on August 3.

On May 1, 2025, they released their debut album Motherfucker, I am Both: "Amen" and "Hallelujah"..., which consists of a single hour-long song that was derived and evolved from a Sprain song that was performed during their last shows and announced that a "sister album" is in production.

From August-September 2025 and April-May 2026 the band embarked on two tours across Europe.

On July 24, 2026, they announced their first EP, Don't Look at Me the Way a Dog Might Look at Your Leg, which released on July 31. It partially consisted of material originally performed live during Kent's solo tours under the moniker Big Brown Cow.

== Band members ==
- Alexander Kent – vocals, guitars, keyboards, percussion, sampler (2024–present)
- Sylvie Simmons – guitars, keyboards, percussion (2024–present)
- Andrew Chanover – drums (2024–present)
- Wesley Nelson – bass (2024–present)
- Elizabeth Carver – keyboards, sampler, percussion (2025–present)

== Discography ==
Studio albums

- Motherfucker, I am Both: "Amen" and "Hallelujah"... (2025; Mishap Records)

EPs

- Don't Look at Me the Way a Dog Might Look at Your Leg (2026; Mishap Records)
