= The Lamb as Effigy =

2023 studio album by Sprain

Studio album by Sprain
- Released: September 1, 2023
- Genres: Experimental rock; noise rock; post-rock; drone; no wave; neoclassical dark wave
- Length: 96:42
- Label: The Flenser
- Producer: Tim Green

Sprain chronology
As Lost Through Collision (2020)	The Lamb as Effigy (2023)	The Lamb as Effigy (Live) (2023)

Singles from The Lamb as Effigy
- 1. "Man Proposes, God Disposes" Released: June 20, 2023; 2. "Privilege of Being" Released: July 12, 2023; 3. "We Think So Ill of You" Released: August 23, 2023

The Lamb as Effigy (also referred to in extended form as The Lamb as Effigy or Three Hundred and Fifty XOXOXOS for a Spark Union With My Darling Divine) is the second and final studio album by American experimental rock band Sprain. It was released on September 1, 2023 via The Flenser.

The album was promoted with three singles; "Man Proposes, God Disposes", "Privilege of Being", and "We Think So Ill of You". It was then followed by a concert that was played two days after its release, that took place one month before Sprain's disbandment in October 2023, in which they played the entirety of the album.

== Background ==
Sprain was formed in Los Angeles by frontman Alex Kent and bassist April Gerloff in early 2018 and self-released their eponymous debut EP later that year. Musically divergent from their later work, it contained a sound heavily influenced by slowcore bands such as Duster and especially Low, with Kent describing the EP as having an "adolescent slant", being written and recorded when Kent was 17 to 18 years old in the aftermath of a mental episode. During the recording, Kent said that he had a "big shift" in what he wanted to make but felt the songs "still needed to be recorded." Their first album, As Lost Through Collision, was released on September 4, 2020 after signing with experimental label The Flenser and marked a sharp transition into heavier and abrasive music. Both received little to no attention from mainstream outlets, though As Lost Through Collision received mostly positive reviews on publications such as Post-Trash, who described it as "...an impressive release that runs through the full spectrum of emotions." Later, Kent said the overall critical reception to the first two projects was "not [bad], but not particularly unique."

== Recording ==
The Lamb as Effigy is a 97-minute album, over twice the length of Sprain's debut. Half of the tracks on the album are over 10 minutes long, with two, "Margin for Error" and "God, or Whatever You Call It" extending to 24 minutes. Kent said that the album was "not long for the sake of being long," and that on the band's previous works, "I was always cutting myself down a little bit" and that this album "ended up being as long as it is because that's how long the songs ended up. There was never any attempt at impressing anyone or posturing an achievement." Kent described the album as a "fully realized project" and a "re-centering of the band" after the COVID-19 pandemic.

After the release of As Lost Through Collision, the COVID-19 pandemic forced Sprain to cancel any touring plans to support the album. However, it did not deter Sprain from rehearsing 2 to 3 times a week during lockdown, according to Kent. When the band secured a booking date at studios to begin recording of The Lamb as Effigy, then-drummer Max Pretzer left, with Kent feeling like it was "the beginning of the end" for the band. Fortunately, they quickly found a new percussionist, Clint Dodson, who Kent felt was "some guy April Gerloff [the bassist] knew," and recording began. Kent said that the process of making the album was difficult and expressed relief that it was finally released, as there were times when he had doubted if it would ever see the light of day.

As well as Pretzer's leaving and Dodson's entrance into the band, there was a major electrical failure during the final stages of recording. The mixing process was reported to be difficult, requiring a collection of multiple years of material recorded across four separate studios to be compiled. During recording, material from what became The Lamb as Effigy was played during intense live shows before it was finished.

Clint Dodson joined as percussionist after the firing of Max Pretzer. According to Kent, songs that were written with Pretzer as well as songs being written at the time were reworked with Dodson to fit his style, with Kent saying Dodson made the songs "a lot better" and that when it came to writing new material, he realized "he's kind of an animal".

== Composition and lyrics ==
The Lamb as Effigy has generally been described as containing elements of experimental rock, noise rock, drone, no wave, and influences from the neoclassical dark wave movement. Kent claims that some songs from the album originated as far back as 2018, the year of the band's founding, specifically mentioning "We Think So Ill of You" as having been played for 2 years prior to its release. He described the expansive sound palette present throughout the album as "an 'everything and the kitchen sink' mentality. No limitations. Why did we bother with them in the first place?" The band had moved towards a more texture-focused sound, and Kent said it was "only natural they [the songs] lent themselves to a wider instrumental palette."

Speaking about the lyrical content and themes of the album, Kent said, "There are definite themes... but I don't think there is one grand overarching journey or whatever... I would identify the primary themes... as guilt, god, and sex." On the specific topic of Christian religious imagery present throughout the album, Kent described his Catholic upbringing and said, "As a result, I am quite familiar with the religion" and that it heavily influences him due to being "seeped in it" throughout his youth.

== Artwork ==
The cover art of The Lamb as Effigy depicts nine pictures of two indiscernible men facing adjacent walls of a room with differing poses with backs turned to the camera, arranged in a grid formation. The cover was inspired by works by Eadweard Muybridge, specifically The Horse in Motion and his famously nude imagery, as well as a picture in a magazine of two people admiring a work by New Zealand artist Giovanni Intra, with Kent taking note of the perspective of the photograph as well as the room. Kent says the poses depict homosexuality or sexuality in general and the look of "being touched by some invisible hand [or force]." The models for the cover were David Blandeur and Máté Tulipán, with Kent noting that they looked like twins from behind. The photo was created by Siyon Ji and Zengyi Zhao.

== Critical reception ==
Professional ratings
Review scores
Source	Rating
Beats Per Minute	70%
The Line of Best Fit	9/10
PopMatters	9/10
Pitchfork	7.0/10

The Lamb as Effigy was met with critical acclaim upon its release. Sadie Sartini Garner of Pitchfork gave the album a 7 out of 10: "the Los Angeles band's sprawling, 96-minute album is an incendiary fusion of noise, post-punk, metal, prog, and drone."

== Track listing ==
All tracks are written by Alexander Kent and music by Sprain.

No.	Title	Length
1.	"Man Proposes, God Disposes"	7:09
2.	"Reiterations"	6:42
3.	"Privilege of Being"	5:28
4.	"Margin For Error"	24:36
5.	"The Commercial Nude"	10:55
6.	"The Reclining Nude"	12:57
7.	"We Think So Ill of You"	4:15
8.	"God, or Whatever You Call It"	24:38
Total length:		1:36:42

=== Notes ===
- On the vinyl release, "We Think So Ill of You" is put as the 4th song to save space on side A.

== Final concert and live album ==
The Lamb as Effigy (Live)

Live album by Sprain
- Released: September 6, 2023
- Genres: Experimental rock; noise rock; post-rock; drone
- Length: 149:35
- Producer: lambbuttons

Sprain chronology
The Lamb as Effigy (2023)	The Lamb as Effigy (Live) (2023)

After the release of The Lamb as Effigy, Sprain performed the album's release show and their final concert overall at the Moroccan Lounge in Los Angeles, where they played The Lamb as Effigy in its entirety as well as a 30 minute new song, an early version of "Motherfucker, I am Both: "Amen" and "Hallelujah"..." (released by Shearling in May of 2025). On September 6, it was released online unofficially on YouTube by user "lambbuttons" with permission from the band. It serves as the band's final release, as they abruptly disbanded a little over a month later.

All tracks are written by Alexander Kent.

No.	Title	Length
1.	"Privilege of Being"	19:14
2.	"Man Proposes, God Disposes"	8:30
3.	"God, or Whatever You Call It"	22:39
4.	"The Reclining Nude"	13:40
5.	"Reiterations"	7:11
6.	"The Commercial Nude"	18:31
7.	"We Think So Ill of You"	5:34
8.	"Margin for Error"	24:59
9.	"Motherfucker, I Am Both: "Amen" and "Hallelujah"..." (early version)	29:17
Total length:		2:29:35

== Personnel ==
Credits derived from liner notes included with vinyl release.

- Clint Dodson – drums, bells, vibraphone, synthesizer
- April Gerloff – bass guitar, synthesizer, bells, engineering
- Sylvie Simmons – guitar, bugle, bells, recorder
- Alexander Kent – vocals, guitar, bells, hammered dulcimer, autoharp, banjo, mandolin, piano, organ, glockenspiel, synthesizer, harmonium, singing saw, orchestral chimes, accordion, recorder, gong, samples, engineering, production, string arrangements, art direction
- JJ Golden – mastering
- Ulrich Krieger – saxophones, contrabass clarinet, string arrangements, conductor
- Máté Tulipán – saxophones, cover model, moral support
- Kyle Bates – synthesizer
- Eric Poulin – French horn
- Tal Katz – cello
- Jayla Tang – violin
- Kris Rahamad – violin
- Joy Yi Saba – viola
- Jason Schimmel – engineering
- Tim Green – engineering, oscillator, mixing, production, patience
- David Blandeur – cover model
- Siyan Ji – photography
- Zengyi Zhao – photography, photo editing
- Suzanne Yeremyan – layout, design
