= Blaine County Courthouse (Idaho) =

- U.S. National Register of Historic Places
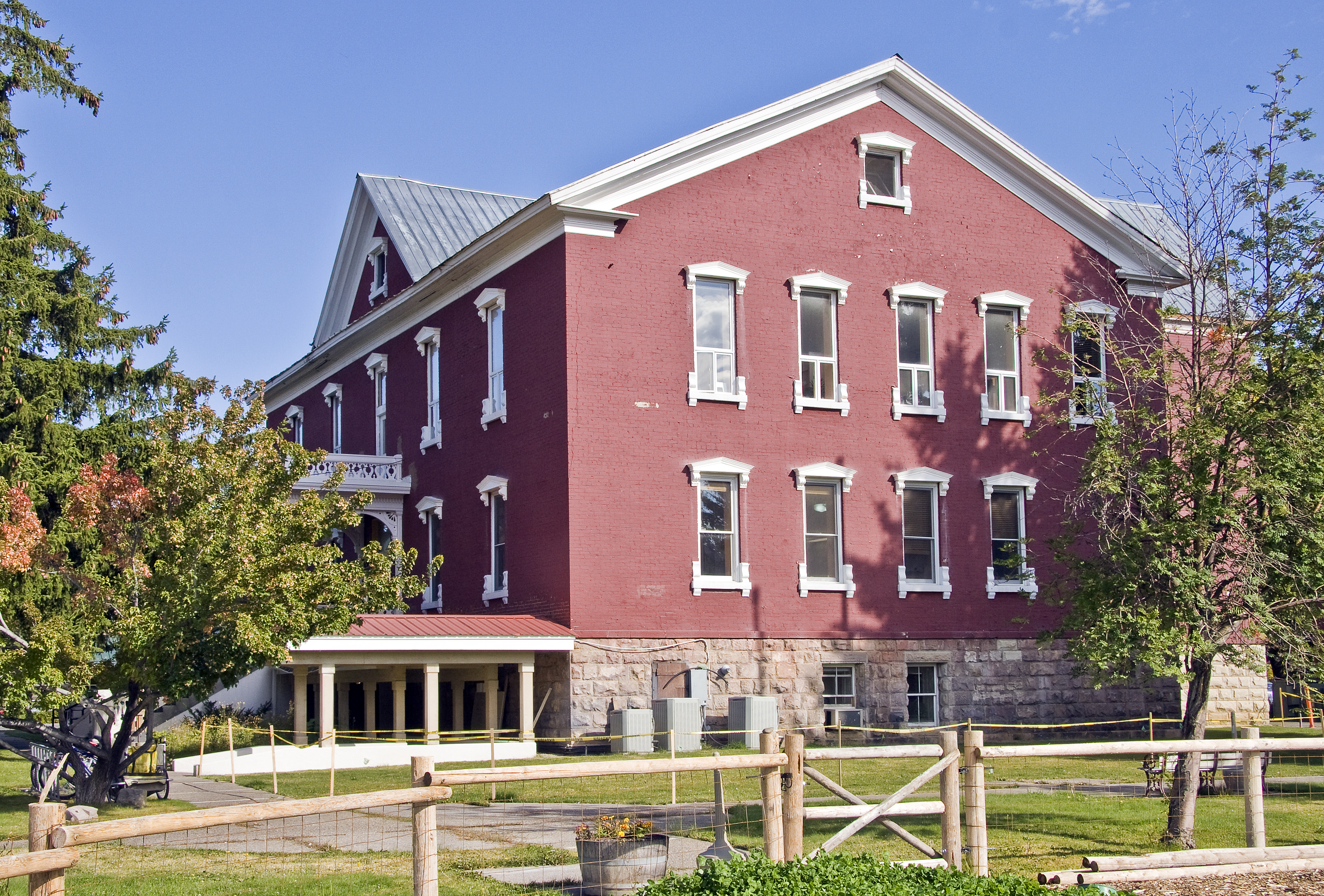

- Location within Idaho Location within the United States
- Location: 1st and Croy Sts., Hailey, Idaho
- Coordinates: 43°31′8″N 114°18′42″W
- Area: less than one acre
- Built: 1883
- Architect: Horace Greeley Knapp
- Architectural style: Italianate
- NRHP reference No.: 78001050
- Added to NRHP: February 17, 1978

The Blaine County Courthouse in Hailey, Idaho is a historic building built in 1883 to serve Alturas County, which later became Blaine County. It is a three-story building that held county offices, a jail, and a courtroom, and, at $40,000 building cost, was the most expensive building in the Idaho Territory, hurting Alturas County financially. Located at 1st and Croy Sts., it was designed by Horace Greeley Knapp in Italianate style. It was listed on the National Register of Historic Places in 1978.

The brick building stands on a raised cutstone basement. According to its National Register nomination, its "most striking features are its cast iron window sills. Originally cast iron pediments capped these windows as well."
