= Motherfucker, I am Both: "Amen" and "Hallelujah"... =

Studio album by Shearling
- Released: May 1, 2025
- Genres: Post-rock; experimental rock; noise rock
- Length: 62:21
- Label: Mishap
- Producer: Alexander Kent

Shearling chronology
Motherfucker, I am Both: "Amen" and "Hallelujah"... (2025)	Don't Look at Me the Way a Dog Might Look at Your Leg (2026)

Motherfucker, I am Both: "Amen" and "Hallelujah"... is the debut studio album by American experimental rock band Shearling, released on May 1, 2025 via Mishap Records. The album, consisting of one 62 minute long track, had been previously performed by front man Alex Kent and guitarist Sylvie Simmon's previous band Sprain, appearing on their live album The Lamb as Effigy (Live), albeit in an unfinished form. According to the band, a "sister album" to Motherfucker is currently in production.

== Reception ==
The Alternative described the album as a "song of sheer passion", elaborating on the statement by stating that "Simmons’ guitar is terrifying and claustrophobic as Kent screams so hard he’s gagging, almost vomiting, at times over drums that slam like a heartbeat. Rather than sounding constricted by fire and fury, Kent funnels this intensity into a hate letter to his home state of Idaho, so detailed that it can only come from a deep place of hostile, earnest observation." Moreover, highlighting the lyrical concepts on the record and its utilization of various symbols from Kent's home state of Idaho. Overall, they state that while the record is jarring and volatile, it retains an overwhelming beauty causing a mix of a dream and a nightmare.

Chris DeVille of Stereogum called the album "expansive in scope and substance, yet unified in its scraping, apocalyptic post-rock aesthetic." Further, stating that the album left them both fascinated and terrified.

== Track listing ==
Motherfucker, I am Both: "Amen" and "Hallelujah"... track listing
No.	Title	Length
1.	"Motherfucker, I am Both: "Amen" and "Hallelujah"..."	62:21
Total length:		62:21

== Personnel ==
Credited are adapted from Bandcamp.

=== Shearling ===
- Alexander Kent – vocals, engineering, production, cover art design, guitar, synthesizer, trombone, samples, hammered dulcimer, banjo, harmonium, accordion, singing saw, percussion, taishogoto, organ, glockenspiel, mellotron, mandolin, autoharp, piano, bells
- Sylvie Simmons – guitar, synthesizer, organ, Hi-C programming, samples
- Wes Nelson – bass, upright bass
- Andrew "Hayes" Chanover – drums

=== Additional personnel ===
- Rachel Kennedy – vocals
- Mate Tulipan – tenor saxophone, trombone
- Ian Thompson – alto saxophone
- Jason Schimmel – engineering, mixing
- Shadrach Tuck – layout design
- Cleo Henman – mastering
- Scott Evans – mixing
