= Sharon Kerry-Harlan =

American textile artist

- Born: 1951 (age 73–74); Miami, Florida, U.S.
- Known for: Textile artist
- Website: sharonkerryharlan.com

Sharon Kerry-Harlan (b. 1951) is an African-American artist active in Hollywood, Florida and Wauwatosa, Wisconsin who is known for her textile art.

== Life ==
Kerry-Harlan was born in Miami, Florida in 1951. She graduated with a Bachelor of Arts degree from Marquette University and studied at the Milwaukee Institute of Art & Design. She went on to work at Marquette University as an Academic Coordinator and to teach textile courses at University of Wisconsin–Milwaukee as an adjunct professor.

In 2022, her work, Portrait of Resilience, from the Flag Series, was acquired by the Smithsonian American Art Museum as part of the Renwick Gallery's 50th Anniversary Campaign.

== Exhibitions ==
- July-August 2019: solo exhibition at the James Watrous Gallery at the Overture Center for the Arts.
- August 2019: And Still We Rise: Race Culture and Visual Conversations exhibit at the Mariposa Museum & World Cultural Center in Oak Bluff, Massachusetts.
- 2021
  - Textile Center and Women of Color Quilters Network’s juried exhibit Racism: In the Face of Hate We Resist.
  - Museum of Wisconsin Art's Claiming Space Exhibition.
- 2022
  - Madison Museum of Contemporary Art's exhibit Ain’t I A Woman? in celebration of the 2022 Wisconsin Triennial
  - Uncovering Black History: Quilts from the Collection of Carolyn Mazloomi exhibition at the International Quilt Museum in Lincoln, Nebraska
