= Konstantin Bokov =

Ukrainian-born American artist

Konstantin Bokov (born 1940 in Shostka, Ukraine) is a Ukrainian born American artist who creates mixed media assemblages, sculptures, and paintings while most often employing found materials and objects.

== Biography ==
He is the son of the poet and songwriter Viktor Bokov (1914–2009). He initially studied music at the Art Academy of Leningrad in what is now once again Saint Petersburg, Russia but soon fell under the spell of the canvases of sunsets by Vincent van Gogh and decided that he wanted to paint. Bokov immigrated the United States in 1975 with his wife and son. He is represented by the Van Der Plas gallery in New York City and also installs works on his own initiative at various locations in his home neighborhood of Washington Heights.

Sometimes considered an outsider artist, Bokov has exhibited at European Outsider Art Fair in Vienna and the Outsider Art Fair in New York City. Bokov's work has been exhibited at the Now Gallery alongside that of Keith Haring and Jean-Michel Basquiat. Most recently he had a solo exhibition at the Van Der Plas Gallery in concert with his 80th birthday titled "Another Man's Treasure for All to Behold". Bokov is the subject of the 2012 documentary "Free" written and directed by Mark Lechner.
