= Sanford L. Smith =

American businessman (1939–2024)

- Born: Sanford Louis Smith; July 22, 1939; New York City, U.S.
- Died: May 25, 2024 (aged 84); New York City, U.S.
- Education: Wharton School of the University of Pennsylvania; University of North Carolina at Chapel Hill
- Occupation: Businessman
- Spouse(s): Patricia Lynch Jill Bokor (m. 1992)

Sanford Louis Smith (July 22, 1939 – May 25, 2024) was an American businessman known for his involvement in art exhibitions.

== Life and career ==
Smith was born in Brooklyn in 1939. He attended the Wharton School of the University of Pennsylvania, majoring in economics. He also attended the University of North Carolina at Chapel Hill, earning his master's degree in communications. He was a funeral director.

In 1979, Smith founded the Fall Antiques Show, a fair focused on American antiques.

In 1992, Smith founded the Outsider Art Fair, helping to create a market for work by self-taught artists.

Smith's company Sanford L. Smith + Associates produced up to 11 fine-art fairs in its heyday and continues to manage and produce Salon Art + Design, the ABAA New York International Antiquarian Book Fair, The Art Show which benefits Henry Street Settlement, and the ESA's Ephemera Fair. The company will continue to produce fairs and events, running the company under the name of its founder.

Smith died of congestive heart failure at a care facility in Manhattan on May 25, 2024, at the age of 84.
