= Nicolas Bokov =

Russian writer (1945–2019)

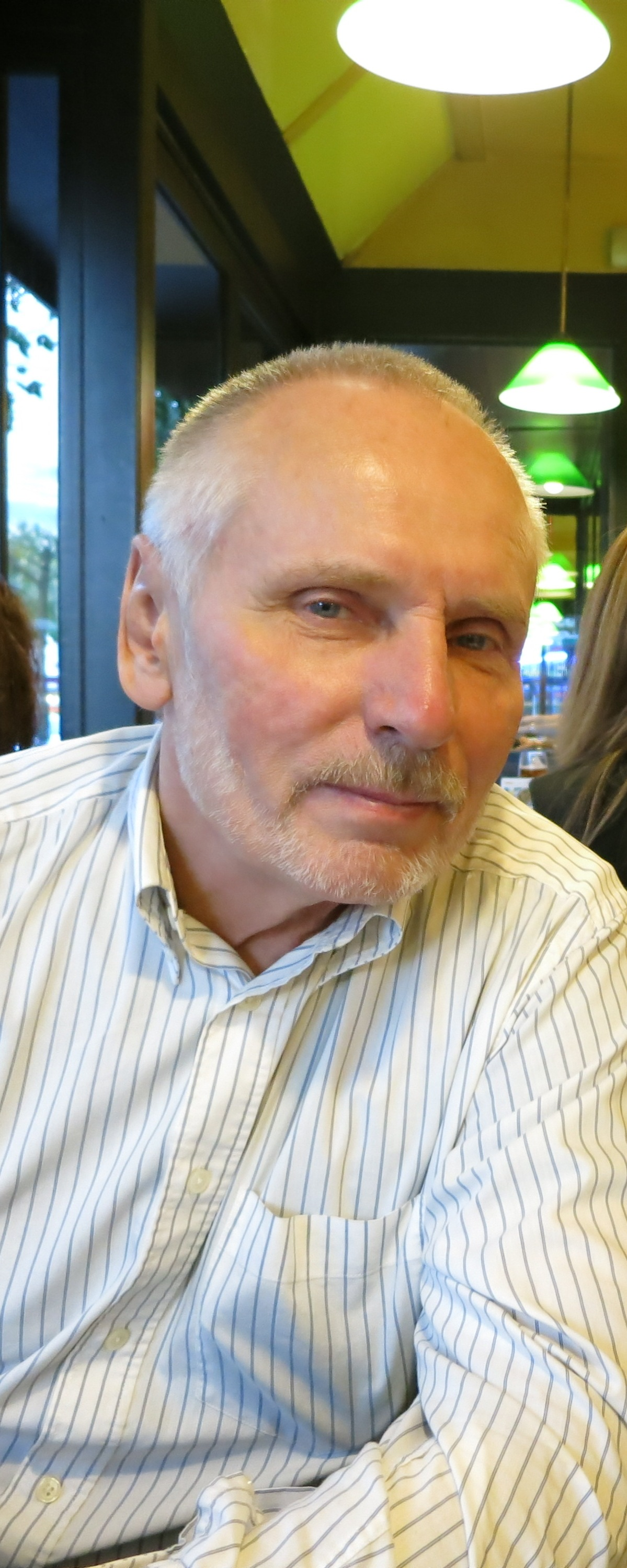
- Nicolas Bokov
- Born: 7 July 1945; Moscow, Russian SFSR
- Died: 2 December 2019 (aged 74); Paris, France
- Occupation: Writer

Nicolas Bokov (born Боков, Николай Константинович, 7 July 1945 – 2 December 2019) was a Russian writer, who emigrated to France in 1975.

== Biography ==
In 1969, Bokov received a degree in philosophy from Moscow State University. He worked at Moscow State for the next three years, but was fired from his position by request of the KGB. He was then often harassed and interrogated by the Soviet government for his involvement in dissent. He published numerous books criticizing the Soviet government written under a pseudonym, which were sold in Western Europe.

On 25 April 1975, Bokov emigrated to Austria, then to France. He wrote books and worked for news agencies. Bokov converted to Christianity in 1982 and took a break from writing. He began to travel throughout the world, residing briefly in the United States, Europe, Greece, and Israel.

In 1988, Bokov returned to France, and began practicing asceticism, residing in the streets of Paris rather than living in a permanent home. He returned to writing in 1998, with the book Dans la rue, à Paris, which was prefaced by Abbé Pierre.

He received The Gladys Krieble Delmas Foundation's prize of the Institut de France in 2001.

Bokov had a column in La Vie russe until 2002.

He was also a member of the PEN Club français.

== Works ==
- Nobody (1975)
- La Tête de Lénine (1982)
- Der Fremdling (1982)
- Dans la rue, à Paris (1998)
- Déjeuner au bord de la Baltique (1999)
- La Conversion (2002)
- La Zone de réponse (2003)
- Or d'automne et pointe d'argent. Conversations avec Victor Koulbak. (2005)
- De tout un peu (2005)
- Liquidation (2008)
- Où va la Russie, et la France avec elle ? (2008)
- Fragmentarium (2008)
- Envie de miracle (2009)
- Opération Betterave (2010)
- Le Pic Dorothée (2010)
- La Bavure (2010)
- Loin de la Tour Eiffel (2015)
