= Ionel Talpazan =

Romanian-American outsider artist (1955–2015)

- Ionel Talpazan in 2000, at work, Silver UFO, with his pet dove, Maria, on his shoulder. Photo: Daniel Wojcik
- Born: Ionel Pârvu; August 16, 1955; Petrâchioaia, Romania
- Died: September 21, 2015 (aged 60); New York, NY
- Known for: UFO drawings and paintings
- Style: outsider art folk art
- Movement: Art brut

Ionel Talpazan (born Ionel Pârvu; August 16, 1955 – September 21, 2015) was a Romanian self-taught outsider artist. He later moved to New York City where he became known in the late 1980s for his paintings of UFOs. He died in New York at the age of 60 on September 21, 2015.

Shortly before his death, he changed his name to Adrian da Vinci, and became a citizen of the United States. During his lifetime, Talpazan produced over 1000 works of art.

Talpazan became fascinated with UFOs when, as an 8 year old boy in Romania, he believed he had seen a UFO. Throughout his life he drew, painted and sculpted UFOs. After his work was discovered, it was exhibited at the American Visionary Art Museum, and at museums in London, Berlin, San Francisco, Madrid, and other countries.

== Early life ==
Talpazan was born on August 16, 1955, in Petrăchioaia, Romania to an unmarried couple. He was a premature twin (the other twin did not survive). He was raised until the age of six by his paternal grandparents, who then put him up for adoption. He was beaten regularly by his foster parents. His first UFO sighting came one night in 1963, when he had run away from home to escape a beating. He claims that he observed "blue energy" in the form of an "enormous blue light overhead, and a glowing blue beam" which he later attributed to an unidentified flying object. While still in Romania, he began to create many drawings of UFOs obsessively. In March 1987, he and a friend swam across the Danube river to Yugoslavia at night to escape communist Romania. There he was imprisoned, and held in a camp for refugees. Later, he was granted asylum as a political refugee, and he immigrated to New York City where he continued to make art and work as a manual laborer.

== Work ==
Talpazan began to draw hundreds of representations of UFOs starting at age 12 that were inspired by his "blue light" experience when he was 8 years old. After he moved to New York City, he began selling his work on the street and was at times homeless. His "regular location" was on Prince Street in Soho. Beginning in the 1990s his work drew the attention of others, and was included in several exhibitions that received reviews in the New York Times and Artforum. Talpazan distrusted art gallerists and dealers, and retreated to a one-room apartment in Harlem, and continued to sell his work on the street. He said of his work "The artist is like an astronaut...With the mind, you can travel the entire universe" and that his art "shows spiritual technology, something beautiful and beyond human imagination".

== Collections ==
His work is included in the permanent collections of the American Museum of Folk Art, the Smithsonian American Art Museum, the Art Brut Collection Bruno Decharme, the Minneapolis Institute of Art, the American Visionary Art Museum, among others.
