= Sprain (band) =

American experimental rock band

Background information
- Origin: Los Angeles, California, US
- Genres: Experimental rock; noise rock; slowcore (early)
- Years active: 2018–2023
- Label: The Flenser
- Spinoffs: Shearling
- Spinoff of: Hybrid Sheep Organizer
- Past members: Alex Kent; April Gerloff; Sylvie Simmons; Clint Dodson; Daniel Talton; Aidan Gould; Max Pretzer

Sprain was an American experimental rock band from Los Angeles, California that formed in 2018. Its final lineup consisted of Alexander Gregory Kent (guitar, vocals, keyboards), April Gerloff (bass guitar), Sylvie Simmons (guitar), and Clint Dodson (drums).

The band released two studio albums and one EP before abruptly disbanding in 2023, a month after the release of their second album The Lamb as Effigy.

== History ==
Following the disbandment of the band Hybrid Sheep Organizer, Alex Kent and several former members regrouped to record new material. Shortly afterward, April Gerloff would join the sessions, and many of these recordings would end up comprising their self-titled debut EP, released in August 2018. It was inspired by slowcore bands such as Low and Duster. After enlisting two new members, Max Pretzer on drums and Sylvie Simmons on secondary guitar, they began work on their debut album.

In December 2019, Sprain signed to The Flenser record label. The band's debut album, As Lost Through Collision, released in September 2020, saw the band playing louder and more abrasive music, by the virtue of having more members. Before recording a follow-up to their debut, drummer Max Pretzer left the band, to be replaced by percussionist Clint Dodson. Their second album The Lamb as Effigy was eventually released on September 1, 2023. The album had been developed extensively through the band's intense live shows from over the preceding years.

On September 3, 2023, the band performed what would turn out to be their final concert at the Moroccan Lounge in Los Angeles, California, where they played The Lamb as Effigy in its entirety, as well as a 30-minute long new song which would later develop into the Shearling project Motherfucker, I am Both: "Amen" and "Hallelujah".... The show would be documented on the officially approved bootleg concert film The Lamb as Effigy (Live). On October 16, 2023, the band abruptly announced their disbandment in a post on their social media accounts. After Sprain's disbandment was announced, bassist April Gerloff revealed that she had been dismissed from the band three weeks prior.

Following the breakup, Kent began a solo career, releasing two albums under his own name, as well as performing live under the moniker Big Brown Cow. Kent and Simmons would also go on to form Shearling and further evolve unused material originally written during their membership in Sprain. Gerloff continues to play in the band Guck.

== Members ==
Final lineup

- Alex Kent – vocals, guitar, piano (2018–2023)
- April Gerloff – bass guitar, synthesizer, engineer (2018–2023)
- Sylvie Simmons – guitar (2019–2023)
- Clint Dodson – drums, percussion (2021–2023)

Previous members

- Daniel Talton – guitar (2018-2019)
- Aidan Gould – drums (2018-2019)
- Max Pretzer – drums (2019–2021)

== Discography ==
=== Studio albums ===
- As Lost Through Collision (2020)
- The Lamb as Effigy (2023)

=== Live albums ===
- The Lamb as Effigy (Live) (2023)

=== EPs ===
- Sprain (2018)

=== Singles ===
- "Worship House" (2020)
- "Constant Hum" (2020)
- "Man Proposes, God Disposes" (2023)
- "Privilege of Being" (2023)
- "We Think So Ill of You" (2023)
