= Anta Sports =

Chinese sportswear company

Anta Sports Products Limited
- Native name: 安踏体育用品有限公司
- Type: Public
- Traded as: SEHK: 2020; Hang Seng Index
- ISIN: KYG040111059
- Industry: Sports equipment, textile
- Founded: 1991; 35 years ago
- Founder: Ding Shizhong
- Headquarters: Jinjiang, Fujian, China
- Area served: Worldwide
- Key people: Ding Shizhong (Chairman)
- Products: Sneakers, clothing, accessories
- Revenue: US$11.46 billion (2025)
- Operating income: US$2.73 billion (2025)
- Net income: US$2.24 billion (2025)
- Owner: Anta International (BVI) (61.84%); Public (38.16%)
- Subsidiaries: Amer Sports, Jack Wolfskin, Fila (Mainland China only)
- Website: anta.com

Anta Sports
- Simplified Chinese: 安踏体育用品有限公司
- Traditional Chinese: 安踏體育用品有限公司
Transcriptions
Standard Mandarin
- Hanyu Pinyin: Āntà Tǐyù Yòngpǐn Yǒuxiàngōngsī

Anta Sports Products Limited is a Chinese sports equipment multinational corporation headquartered in Jinjiang, China. It is the world's third-largest sportswear company by revenue, behind Nike and Adidas, and ahead of Li-Ning.

Founded in 1991, its operations involve the business of designing, developing, manufacturing and marketing products, including sportswear, footwear, apparel and accessories under its own brand name. Its main subsidiary is the Finnish sport retailer Amer Sports, which itself manages 25 apparel brands such as Arc'teryx, Salomon, and Wilson. Anta also bought a 29% stake in Puma in 2026.

Publicly traded on the Hong Kong Stock Exchange, Anta Sports is a part of the Hang Seng Index. Anta Sports has been an official supplier of the International Olympic Committee in the modern era.

== History ==
Anta was founded by Ding Shizhong in 1991. In 2008, the Beijing Olympics gave Anta the opportunity to expand its business marketing footwear.

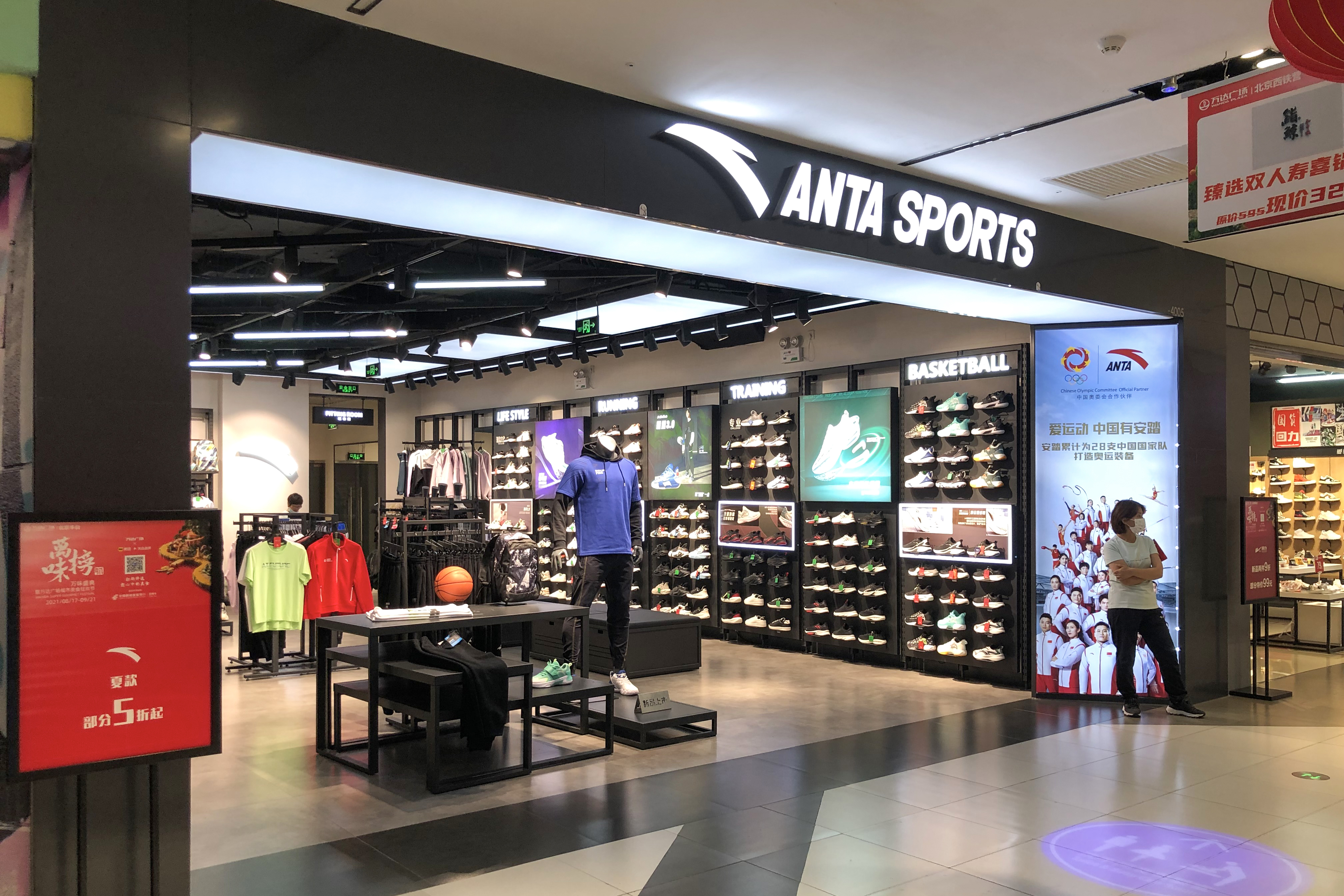
Anta Sports store at Beijing Xitieying Wanda Plaza

Anta Sports was listed as 2020.HK on the Hong Kong Stock Exchange in 2007, with its IPO price at HK$5.28 per share. In 2009, the company acquired the Fila trademark in mainland China, Hong Kong and Macao from Belle International. Since then, the company operates the Fila business in these three areas. The company also operates Descente and Sprandi stores in China, as well as Kolon Sport and Kingkow stores in mainland China, Hong Kong and Macao.

Former Minnesota Timberwolves forward Kevin Garnett left his former shoe sponsor Adidas and has been sponsored by Anta since August 2010. Golden State Warriors guard Klay Thompson also left his Nike sponsor and has been signed with Anta since 2017. Klay Thompson's new contract with Anta will run through 2026 and could pay him up to $80 million.

In December 2018, an investor consortium consisting of Anta Sports, FountainVest Partners, Anamered Investments and Tencent announced a voluntary recommended public cash tender offer for all issued and outstanding shares in Amer Sports.

Anta Sports temporarily boycotted the NBA in October 2019 as a result of a re-tweet by a Houston Rockets' official in support of protests in Hong Kong.

In October 2023, it was announced Anta Sports had acquired a majority (75.13%) stake in the female athleisure brand, Maia Active for an undisclosed amount.

In January 2026 Anta Sports have acquired a 29% stake of German sports clothing brand Puma for €1.5bn, becoming the largest shareholder in the company.

== Brands ==
- Anta
  - Anta Kids
  - AntapluS
- Jack Wolfskin
- Amer Sports (44.5% ownership)
  - Arc'teryx
  - Salomon
  - Wilson
    - DeMarini
    - EvoShield
    - Louisville Slugger
  - Peak Performance
  - Atomic Skis
  - Armada
  - Sports Tracker
  - ATEC
  - Luxilon
- Puma (29.06% ownership)
- Fila (Mainland China only)
  - Fila Fusion
  - Fila Kids
  - Fila Athletics
- Descente (Mainland China, Hongkong, Macau only)
- Kolon Sport (50% ownership)
- KingKow
- Sprandi
- Maia Active (75.13% ownership)

== Sponsorships ==
Anta Sports is the official supplier and sponsor of numerous teams, players, and associations.

Anta Sports signed American born freestyle skier Eileen Gu in 2020 as a brand ambassador.

Anta Sports and Kyrie Irving launched their first sneaker together in 2024.

=== Current ===
Basketball

- (United States) Alex Caruso
- (United States) Kevon Looney
- (United States) Klay Thompson
- (United States) Gordon Hayward
- (United States) Jacob Evans
- (United States) Hamidou Diallo
- (United States) Rajon Rondo
- (Argentina) Luis Scola
- (United States) James Wiseman
- (United States) Kyrie Irving
- (United States) Caris LeVert

College teams

- (Philippines) Adamson Soaring Falcons
- (Philippines) UE Red Warriors
- (Philippines) Benilde Blazers
- (Philippines) San Beda Red Lions

Boxing

- (Philippines) Manny Pacquiao

Long-distance running

- (Ethiopia) Kenenisa Bekele

Freestyle Skiing

- (China) Eileen Gu

=== Former ===
Leagues

- (Philippines) Maharlika Pilipinas Basketball League (2023–25)

Teams

- Chad national football team
- (China) Zhejiang Professional F.C.

Athletes

- (United States) Chandler Parsons
- (United States) Kevin Garnett
- (Philippines) Danny Seigle

Until the end of 2022, Anta Sports was the official supplier of the International Olympic Committee, sponsored 26 Chinese national teams in winter sports, boxing, taekwondo, gymnastics, weightlifting, wrestling, judo, surfing, water polo and golf.
