= FountainVest Partners =

Asian investment firm

- Native name: 方源资本
- Type: Private
- Industry: Investment Management
- Founded: December 2007; 18 years ago
- Founders: Frank Tang; George Chuang; Terry Hu; Chenning Zhao
- Headquarters: Two IFC, Hong Kong
- Key people: Frank Tang (Chairman and CEO)
- AUM: US$11 billion (2022)
- Website: fountainvest.com

FountainVest Partners (FountainVest; Chinese: 方源资本; pinyin: Fāngyuán Zīběn) is a Chinese private equity firm investing primarily in Asia. The firm focuses on China's media and entertainment, sports and consumer-related sectors although it has expanded into other areas in recent years.

Headquartered in Hong Kong, the firm has additional offices in Beijing, Frankfurt, Shanghai and Singapore.

== Background ==
In December 2007, Frank Tang and several other senior executives at Temasek Holdings founded FountainVest. Major investors of the firm at the time were Temasek Holdings, the CPP Investment Board and Ontario Teachers' Pension Plan. The firm raised almost $1 billion for its first China-focused private equity fund despite the 2008 financial crisis. For many investors, FountainVest was the first Chinese private equity fund they committed money to. By 2022, the company closed its fourth fund, that one being of $2.9 billion.

=== Investment strategy ===
FountainVest's investment strategy is based around three core themes: the rising middle class, urbanisation and sustainable development. The typical deal size is $50 million - $150 million enterprise value on entry as it has already passed the early stage company risk while still having potential to become a billion dollar company.

== Notable deals ==
In November 2009, FountainVest, Sequoia Capital and CITIC Capital acquired a stake worth $180 million in Sina Corporation which runs Weibo, China's most popular microblogger. The purpose was to strengthen Sina management's hold on the company and allow it to finance future acquisitions.

In 2012, an investor consortium including FountainVest and The Carlyle Group took Focus Media private via a $3.7 billion leveraged buyout deal. At the time it was the largest leveraged buyout deal in China. In 2015, FountainVest held a stake of just below the 20 per cent of Focus Media and CITIC about 17.5 percent. Focus Media and FountainVest partners eventually set up the joint venture Focus Media FountainVest Sports worth $400 million aimed to invest in sports. The consortium later relisted Focus Media on the Shenzhen Stock Exchange via a reverse merger in 2015 in a deal worth $7.4 billion. Finally in July 2018, the consortium exited Focus Media after they sold their stake in Focus Media to the Alibaba Group for $1.2 billion.

In January 2014, Fountainvest joined an investor consortium to privatise Nasdaq-listed company, Shanda Games for $1.9 billion. However, in September 2014, it pulled out of the deal.

In August 2014, Fountainvest and CPP Investment Board acquired Key Safety Systems for $800 Million. In February 2016, Fountainvest and its partners sold Key Safety Systems to Ningbo Joyson Electronic Corporation for $920 Million.

In June 2016, Endeavor formed a joint venture in China with FountainVest, Sequoia Capital and Tencent. In April 2022 Endeavor acquired the remaining stake of the joint venture for $158 million.

By September 2017, FountainVest acquired the German Bosch Mahle Turbo Systems (BMTS), a joint venture of Bosch and Mahle founded in 2008 that produces turbochargers. The company had 1300 employees at the time. In April 2021, FountainVest led a consortium, which invested $220 million in the self driving truck company Plus AI.

In 2018, the company teamed up with CITIC and acquired a stake of 50 per cent in Loscam, an Australian pallet producer from China Merchants. In May 2024, it was reported there were talks to sell the company for $2 billion.

In December 2018 an investor consortium led by Anta Sports that included FountainVest and Tencent acquired Amer Sports for $5.2 billion. In Amer sports are included the ski brands Atomic, Salomon and the tennis racket producer Wilson.

In November 2021 FountainVest struck a deal to acquire the Chinese franchises of Papa John's and Dairy Queen for $160 million. An expansion from currently around 160 to 1,350 restaurants by 2040 in Southern China was agreed upon. For the Chinese branch of Dairy Queen an expansion from 900 to 1500 until 2040 was planned.

In November 2024, FountainVest and Unison Capital acquired Japanese jeweler Tasaki from MBK Partners for $660 million.
