= Sports Tracker =

Former software tool

- Developer(s): Sports Tracking Technologies Ltd.
- Initial release: 2007; 18 years ago
- Operating system: Android; Blackberry; iOS; MeeGo; Symbian; Windows Phone
- Type: Health informatics, physical fitness
- License: Freemium
- Website: sports-tracker.com

Sports Tracker, earlier Nokia Sports Tracker, was originally a software tool for Symbian Series 60 phones (particularly those that included a GPS facility such as the Nokia N95, or bluetooth phones with the addition of a bluetooth-compatible GPS receiver) that allowed its user to track their route, speed, timings and energy expenditure, while engaging in a sport activity such as running, jogging or cycling.

Nokia announced that Nokia Sports Tracker was closed in June 2010, but the application was continued by Sports Tracking Technologies Ltd. simply as Sports Tracker, which was set up by three people from the team in Nokia. It is now available for iPhone and Android devices and allows its user to track and analyze their performance and to share workout data and photos with its friends.

In 2015, the company was acquired by Amer Sports, as part of the group digital acceleration.

In 2019, the company was joined the Chinese group Anta Sports, with sister brands Wilson, Atomic, Suunto, Precor, and Arc'teryx as part of the purchase of Amer Sports.

== Service accuracy ==
In 2013, a study was conducted on the accuracy of trackers on smartphones, where the work of ten different services was analyzed. According to these results, Sports Tracker ranked 2nd-4th in distance accuracy, and 9th in elevation difference.

== See also ==
- Google Fit
- MSN Health & Fitness
- Apple Health
- Strava
- Endomondo
- Runkeeper
