= Atomic Skis =

Austrian ski equipment company

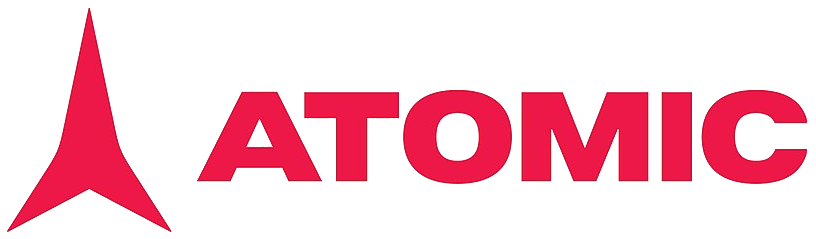
- Type: Subsidiary
- Industry: Sports equipment
- Founded: 1955; 71 years ago
- Headquarters: Altenmarkt im Pongau, Austria
- Products: Skiing equipment, apparel
- Revenue: 371 of the 1.533 billion EUR (2009) Amer Sports Turnover
- Number of employees: 750
- Parent: Amer Sports
- Website: atomic.com

Atomic Austria GmbH is an Austrian sports equipment company headquartered in Altenmarkt im Pongau, Austria. It manufactures and sells skis and other skiing equipment, such as boots, bindings, helmets, ski poles, goggles, bags, apparel and protective equipment. Atomic is a subsidiary of Finnish retail conglomerate Amer Sports, which in turn oversees Arc'teryx, Precor, Salomon, Suunto, Sports Tracker, and Wilson.

== History ==
Alois Rohrmoser founded Atomic in 1955. In 1971, the company increased its production capacity by building a second factory in Altenmarkt im Pongau, where the majority of their ski production still takes place. In 1981, Atomic started production in the Bulgarian city of Chepelare, becoming the first west-block company to open a plant in the eastern-bloc countries. Atomic continued to expand its range, and in 1989, it became the first one-stop supplier for skis, bindings, boots and poles. Ski production peaked at 831,000 pairs in 1991 and 1992.

Atomic faced financial difficulties due to high products rejection when transitioning to the "Schalenski" technology (cap ski), and to failures in the booming snowboard market. In 1994, the BAWAG requested Atomic to be put in insolvency.

In November 1994, the Amer Sports Group (which also includes Arc'teryx, Peak Performance, Armada, DeMarini, Wilson, Suunto, Precor, Volant and Salomon) acquired Atomic for 918.7 million schillings (66.8 million euros), and in March 2006 the insolvency procedures were lifted.

Today Atomic manufactures around 400,000 pairs of skis per year.

== Technology ==
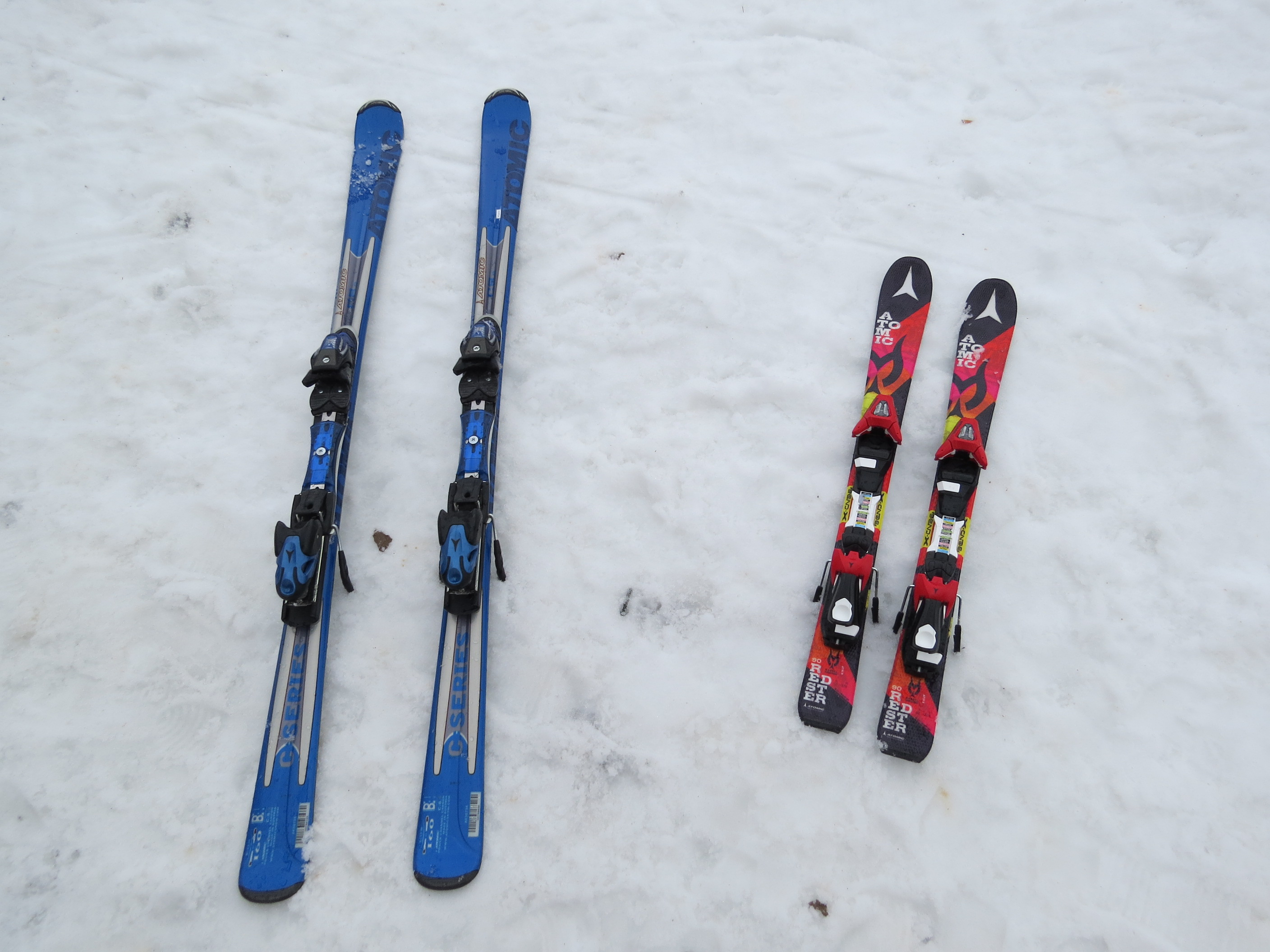
Atomic Alpine skis, 2018

In 2008 Atomic brought Doubledeck to market, the first technology to automatically adapt the radius and flex to the style of the skier and skiing conditions. Atomic developed the LiveFit (2009), a ski boot which automatically adapts to the shape of the foot. Since 2009, Atomic's skis have also been available with various Rocker technologies. Atomic has recently developed Memory Fit, a heat fitting technology that adapts the boot to the users foot, which can be found on two of the market's top selling boots.

Atomic is also committed to the development of more environmentally-friendly production methods: the factory in Altenmarkt uses a wood pellet heating system during the manufacturing process. The "Renu" line comprises skis and boots largely made of recyclable and renewable materials.

== Sponsorship ==
Atomic currently sponsors male and female athletes in alpine skiing, freestyle skiing, touring skiing, Nordic combined, cross-country skiing, and biathlon.
