= Staffordshire tennis league =

Willworsham

The Wilson Staffordshire Inter-Club Tennis League is a regional tennis league incorporating all of Staffordshire and parts of Worcestershire. The League is currently sponsored by Wilson Sporting Goods.

== History ==
The first competition held under the league was in 1936. Except for during World War II, a competition has been held annually.

The league currently has 36 clubs with 86 men's teams and 46 ladies teams.

== Clubs ==
Clubs in 2013	Men's A	Men's B	Men's C	Men's D	Men's E	Men's F	Women's A	Women's B	Women's C	Women's D	Women's E
Abbey View	1 North	2 North									
Albert	Premier 1	Premier 2	Premier 2	2 South	3 South	6 South	Premier 1	1 South	1 South	4 South	
Basford						Premier 2	Premier 2				
Bilston	1 South	4 South									
Brewood	5 South	7 South	7 South				2 South				
Cannock	1 South	5 South									
Church Eaton	1 North						1 North				
David Lloyd Dudley	1 South	4 South	5 South				1 South				
David Lloyd Great Barr	2 South	6 South					2 South	3 South			
Draycott	Premier 1	2 North	2 North	3 North	3 North		Premier 1	1 North			
Eccleshall	3 North										
Endon	1 North	3 North					1 North	1 North			
Etching Hill	Premier 2	1 North	2 North				Premier 1	Premier 2			
Florence	Premier 1	1 North	2 North				1 North				
Great Bridgeford	2 North	2 North									
Halesowen	4 South						1 South				
Hanbury	3 South	6 South					1 South				
Lea Hall	2 North										
Lichfield Friary	Premier 2	2 South					Premier 2				
Linden Lea	3 South	6 South	7 South				3 South	4 South			
Old Hill	4 South						4 South				
Quarry Bank	4 South	5 South					Premier 1				
Reedswood	1 South	7 South					2 South				
Stone	Premier 2	1 North	1 North	3 North			Premier 2	1 North			
Stourbridge	2 South										
Streetly	Premier 1	Premier 2	3 South	6 South			Premier 1	3 South			
Tettenhall	5 South						4 South				
Virgin Active	3 South										
Walsall	Premier 1	1 South	2 South	4 South	6 South		2 South	3 South	4 South		
Walton	3 North	3 North	3 North				Premier 2	1 North			
Wednesbury	3 South	7 South									
Westlands	Premier 2										
Wollaston	1 South	2 South	5 South	6 South			1 South	2 South	2 South	3 South	
Wolverhampton	Premier 1	Premier 1	1 South	2 South	3 South	7 South	Premier 1	Premier 2	1 South	1 South	4 south
Wombourne	4 South	6 South					2 South	3 South			
Woodfield	5 South										

== Champions ==
Year	Men's Champions - Purdy Cup	Women's Champions - Dr. Lambah Cup
2013	Wolverhampton	Quarry Bank
2012	Wolverhampton	Quarry Bank
2011	Draycott	Wolverhampton
2010	Draycott	Wolverhampton
2009	Draycott	Wolverhampton
2008	Streetly	Wolverhampton
2007	Streetly	Wolverhampton
2006	Wolverhampton	Wolverhampton
2005	Streetly	Wolverhampton
2004	Draycott	Basford
2003	Draycott	Streetly
2002	Draycott	Wolverhampton
2001	David Lloyd Great Barr	Streetly
2000	Wolverhampton	Streetly
1999	Bilston	Streetly
1998	Bilston	Streetly
1997	Bilston	Stone
1996	Bilston	Stone
1995	Wolverhampton	Stone
1994	Wolverhampton	Stone
1993	Wolverhampton	Stone
1992	Wolverhampton	Stone
1991	Florence	Lichfield
1990	Florence	Stone
1989	Florence	Stone
1988	Bilston	Lichfield
1987	Bilston	Lichfield
1986	Bilston	Lichfield
1985	Albert	Lichfield
1984	Albert	Lichfield
1983	Albert	Albert
1982	Florence	Wolverhampton
1981	Albert	Stone
1980	Florence	Stone
1979	Florence	Lichfield Friary
1978	Florence	Wolverhampton
1977	Woodfield	Albert
1976	Wolverhampton	Lichfield Friary
1975	Basford	Lichfield Friary
1974	Basford	Basford
1973	Basford	Lichfield Friary
1972	Woodfield	Lichfield Friary
1971	Basford	Basford
1970	Basford	Lichfield Friary
1969	Basford	Lichfield Friary
1968	Woodfield	Stafford
1967	Woodfield	Lichfield Friary
1966	Woodfield	Stafford
1965	Stone	Lichfield Friary
1964	Stafford	Stafford
1963	Stafford	Stafford
1962	Trentham	Stafford/Lichfield Friary
1961	Trentham	Stafford/Lichfield Friary
1960	Trentham	(No Competition)
1959	Wolverhampton	Stafford
1958	Wolverhampton	Stafford/Lichfield Friary
1957	Wolverhampton	Stafford
1956	Wolverhampton	Stafford
1955	Wolverhampton	Trentham
1954	Trentham	Stafford
1953	Trentham	Trentham
1952	Trentham	Stafford
1951	Wolverhampton	Wolverhampton
1950	Trentham	Wolverhampton
1949	Bilston	Trentham
1948	Trentham	Stafford
1947	Trentham	Trentham
1938	Wolverhampton	Trentham
1937	Wolverhampton	Basford
1936	Wolverhampton	Stone
