= EvoShield =

American sports gear brand

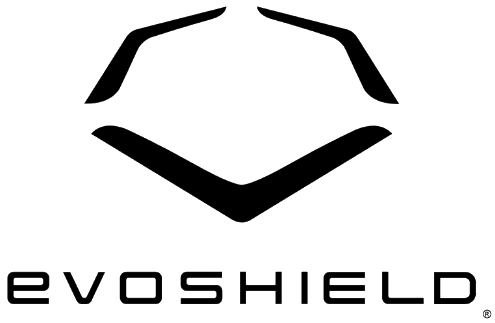
- Company type: LLC
- Industry: Athletic protective gear
- Founded: 2006
- Headquarters: Athens, Georgia, United States
- Area served: North America
- Products: List: Compression garment; Elbow pads; Jockstraps; Shin guards; Shoulder pads
- Number of employees: 20+
- Parent: Wilson
- Website: evoshield.com

EvoShield is an American brand that specializes in protective gear. Some of EvoShield products are wrist guards, elbow guards, as well as rib and heart protectors for the sports of baseball, gridiron football, lacrosse and softball.

EvoShield patented the "Gel-to-Shell" technology, a material that reacts with elements in the air and turns the product from a soft, moldable material to a hard and durable shell. In October 2016, the company was acquired by Wilson Sporting Goods Co., a subsidiary of Amer Sports Corporation. Wilson currently manufactures and sells high performance gloves, bats, uniforms, apparel, protective gear, accessories, and player development equipment and training tools through its Wilson Ball Glove, Louisville Slugger, DeMarini and ATEC brands. The Company markets and sells EvoShield-branded products through its baseball and softball business unit. Wilson will market and sell EvoShield as a stand-alone brand, similar to how it is sold today.

== History ==
EvoShield was established in 2006 under the name All Sports Armour. Initial expertise was derived from a chemist, a cardiologist, and a group of former collegiate and professional athletes. After two years of extensive research, design, field and lab testing, the founders released their impact-dispersing protection to the public in 2007. Products are widely available at such sporting goods retailers as Dick's Sporting Goods, Hibbett Sports, Sport Chalet, and Academy Sports and Outdoors among others.

In October 2024, announced a partnership with the University of Virginia baseball team, marking their first foray into creating NCAA baseball uniforms.

EvoShield also provides the uniforms worn by the teams of Banana Ball .

== Technology ==
EvoShield's protective shields are made of a unique porous composite material that hardens with exposure to air. As the shields harden, they form to the shape of the athlete's body, creating a custom fit protective guard. The material begins soft and flexible, but the chemical components inside the gel-like pads begin to harden when the shields are removed from the foil bag. In about 20–30 minutes, the once soft pad transforms into a hard and protective guard that is permanently molded to the desired shape.

Results from intensive impact deformation testing have shown that EvoShield products disperse the force of impact better than EVA foam and hard plastic, the most common materials found in sports protection. The results, shown below, are measures of backface deformation. Backface deformation is the effect of a non-penetrating projectile on the rear face of a strike plate. It essentially measures how far an object is allowed to protrude against a protective surface. The extent of allowable deformation set by NIJ is 44 mm.”

== Bibliography ==
- Erwin, Sandra I. "Army's Procedures for Testing Body Armor Stir Controversy." NDIA's Business and Technology Magazine. NDIA, Oct. 2009. Web. 21 July 2011. <https://web.archive.org/web/20091124083519/http://www.nationaldefensemagazine.org/archive/2009/October/Pages/Army%E2%80%99sProceduresforTestingBodyArmorStirControversy.aspx>.
- Rovell, Darren. "Evoshield Gets Big Buzz before It Hits Stores." CNBC.com. CNBC, 1 Nov. 2010. Web. 21 July 2011. <https://www.cnbc.com/id/39950568/Evoshield_Gets_Big_Buzz_Before_It_Hits_Stores >.
- Southern Impact Research Center, LLC, comp. Rep. no. R3442. Print.
