= Peak Performance =

Peak Performance can refer to:

- Peak Performance (clothing brand)
- Peak Performance Maine Marathon
- Peak Performance Motorsports
- Peak Performance Project
- Peak Performance (Star Trek: The Next Generation)
- Peak Performance (video game)
- Peak Performance 500
