= Ripper (racquet) =

Trademarked racquetball racquet

"Ripper" racquetball racquet

Ripper is a racquetball racquet. It is labeled with the word titanium, the slogan "Crushing power", the registered trademark "Wilson", as well as the "U.S. Pat. No. 6,935,975". According to the on-line United States Patent and Trademark Office as of 11 May 2007, there were only two "live" trademarks for the full mark, "Ripper". The racquet is also labeled with "Ripper" followed by the trademark symbol "TM". Wilson Sporting Goods claims that the racquet is made in China and has a:

- weight of 215 grams,
- head size of 108 square inches,
- string tension of 33 to 35 lbf, and
- an even balance.
