= Salomon Group =

French sports equipment manufacturing company

Salomon SAS
- Type: Subsidiary
- Industry: Sporting goods
- Founded: 1947; 79 years ago
- Founder: Georges Salomon
- Headquarters: Épagny-Metz-Tessy, France
- Key people: Guillaume Meyzenq (CEO)
- Revenue: €900 million (2020)
- Number of employees: 2,729 (2018)
- Parent: Amer Sports
- Website: salomon.com

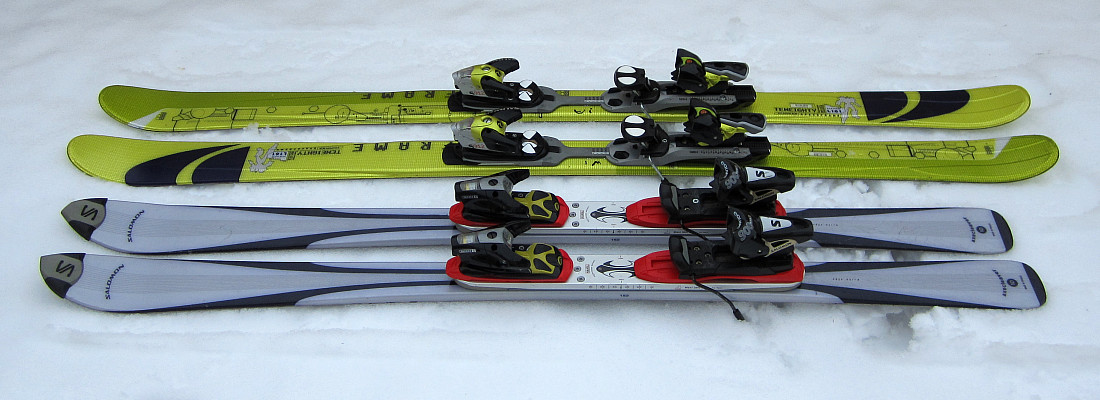
Salomon skis: the 1080 and the Axecleaver, 2016

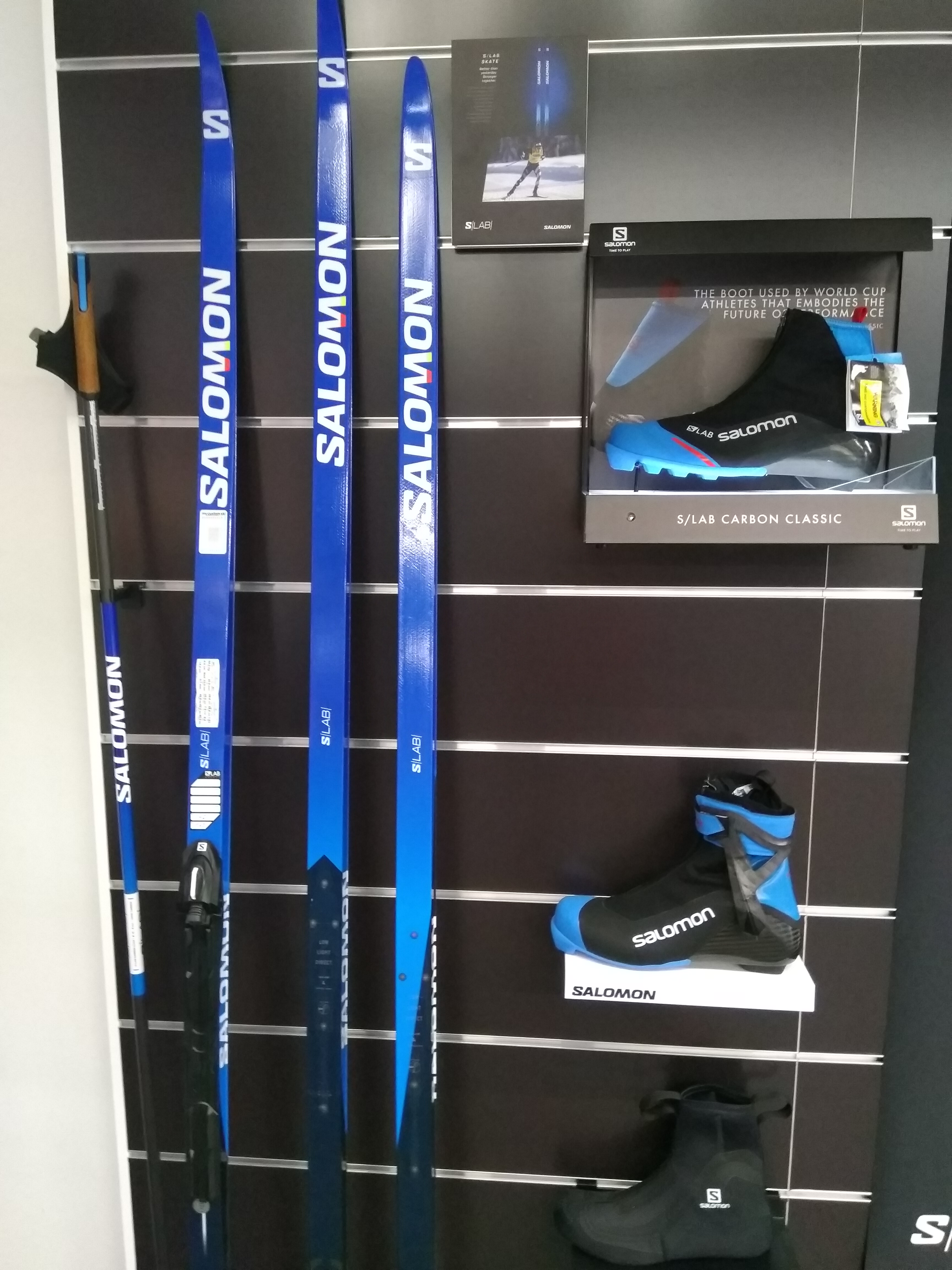
Salomon cross country skies SLab Skate

Salomon SAS is a French sports equipment manufacturing company headquartered in Annecy, France. It was founded in 1947 by François Salomon. Salomon is owned by Finnish retail conglomerate Amer Sports, along with Wilson, Atomic, and Arc'teryx, among others.

== History ==
Salomon was founded in 1947 in the city of Annecy. François Salomon launched the company by producing ski edges in a small workshop, with only his wife and son, Georges, to help. Georges Salomon is credited with taking the company and evolving it toward a global outdoor sports brand.

The Salomon Group was purchased by Adidas in 1997 and the name was changed to Adidas-Salomon AG. The purchase also included TaylorMade and Maxfli. Adidas sold the company to Amer Sports in 2005.

In 2019, Amer Sports was acquired by a consortium led by Chinese sportswear giant Anta Sports Products. In February 2024, Amer Sports returned to public markets via an IPO on the New York Stock Exchange (NYSE: AS), raising approximately $1.37 billion. Anta Sports remains the largest shareholder.

Salomon was a premium partner for the Olympic and Paralympic Winter Games Milano Cortina 2026, and supplied apparel, footwear, and accessories to technical staff, competition judges, volunteers, and those participating in the Olympic and Paralympic torch relay.

== Operations ==
Salomon produces products for various sports markets, including trail running, hiking, climbing, adventure racing, skiing, and snowboarding in over 40 countries. They used to manufacture inline skates, transferring technologies from their ski boot range, but have not released any in recent years.

Salomon's CEO is Guillaume Meyzenq. Salomon is part of Amer Sports, headquartered in Helsinki, Finland. The US operations of are located in Ogden, Utah.

Salomon also sponsors and hosts trail races throughout the world, including the Golden Trail Series. It also runs Salomon TV, a channel that tells stories about athletes, places and characters from the world of skiing, trail running, and the outdoors.

== Products ==
=== Apparel ===
They have a wide range of indoor and outdoor clothing for men, women, and kids that include jackets, base layers, shorts, pants, and tights.

=== Shoes ===
Salomon has shoes for various activities but specializes in shoes for outdoor activities like skiing, snowboarding, hiking, and trail running. While Salomon hiking shoes are designed with outdoor sports in mind, in 2023 the fashion industry adopted the XT-6 trail-ready sneaker, and celebrities such as Bella Hadid, Hailey Bieber, and Emily Ratajkowski have been spotted sporting the shoe. Salomon shoes have also increased in popularity thanks to gorpcore, a fashion aesthetic that is centered around the utilitarian and practical style of outdoor apparel. In 2026, Salomon collaborated with Baltimore-based streetwear and skate brand Carpet Company on the limited-edition XT-Whisper Void.

=== Sports Accessories ===
Salomon produces sports accessories for skiing, snowboarding, hiking, road running, and trail running. They have a wide range of accessories like boards, bindings, bags, goggles, protective gear, gloves, socks, headgear, even flasks and water bottles.

== Financials ==
Salomon does not publish standalone full financial statements; its results are reported within the Outdoor Performance segment of parent company Amer Sports. In 2020, the company reported revenue of approximately €900 million. By 2022, global sales had reached €1 billion. Footwear became the main growth driver. In 2024, Salomon footwear alone surpassed $1 billion in sales for the first time.

In 2025, Salomon surpassed $2 billion in annual revenue, driven largely by footwear and the growth of its Sportstyle line. The brand recorded approximately 35% year-over-year growth. Softgoods (footwear, apparel and accessories) accounted for the majority of sales, rising to around 71% of the Outdoor Performance segment (up from 54% in 2022).
