= Amer Sports =

Finnish sporting good company

Amer Sports, Inc.
- Type: Public
- Traded as: NYSE: AS; Russell 1000 component
- Industry: Sports equipment
- Founded: 1950; 76 years ago
- Headquarters: Helsinki, Uusimaa, Finland
- Area served: Worldwide
- Key people: James Zheng (CEO); Michael Sørensen (COO); Andrew Page (CFO)
- Products: Sports equipment, apparel, footwear
- Brands: Arc'teryx; Armada; Atec; Atomic; DeMarini; EvoShield; Louisville Slugger; Luxilon; Peak Performance; Salomon; Wilson
- Revenue: ▲US$5.18 billion (2024)
- Operating income: ▲US$471 million (2024)
- Net income: ▲US$78.4 million (2024)
- Total assets: ▼US$8.34 billion (2024)
- Total equity: ▲US$5.01 billion (2024)
- Owners: Anta Sports (44.5%); Chip Wilson (16.3%); FountainVest Partners (12.7%); Tencent (4.5%)
- Number of employees: 13,400 (2024)
- Website: amersports.com

Amer Sports, Inc. is a Finnish multinational sporting equipment division based in Helsinki, Finland. Established in 1950 as an industrial conglomerate with interests as diverse as tobacco trading, ship owning and publishing, Amer has gradually evolved into a multinational firm devoted to the production and marketing of sporting goods. The company employs over 9,700 people. Since 2018, Amer has been a subsidiary of Chinese retail conglomerate Anta Sports.

Amer Sports owns a portfolio of companies, including Atomic, Arc'teryx, Armada, Peak Performance, Salomon, and Wilson, among others.

== History ==
=== Industrial past (1950–1985) ===
The company began life as a tobacco manufacturer and distributor, Amer-Tupakka, in 1950 (later to be renamed Amer-Yhtymä Oyj followed by its current designation) and acquired the right to produce and sell Philip Morris cigarettes in Finland in 1961. In the 1960s, the significant profits from the company's tobacco interests were invested in three commercial ships. A publishing and printing division was added in 1970 with the purchase of the Finnish company Weilin+Göös, and the company listed on the Helsinki Stock Exchange in 1977, four years after changing its name to Amer-Yhtymä (English: Amer Group).

In the 1980s, Amer moved into the vehicle import industry by acquiring the firm Korpivaara, and with it the exclusive rights to import and distribute such brands as Citroën and Toyota. In 1984 Amer was listed on the London Stock Exchange. In 1985, Amer acquired Marimekko. The decade also saw the company expand into for example the plastics markets.

=== Focus on sport (1986–present) ===
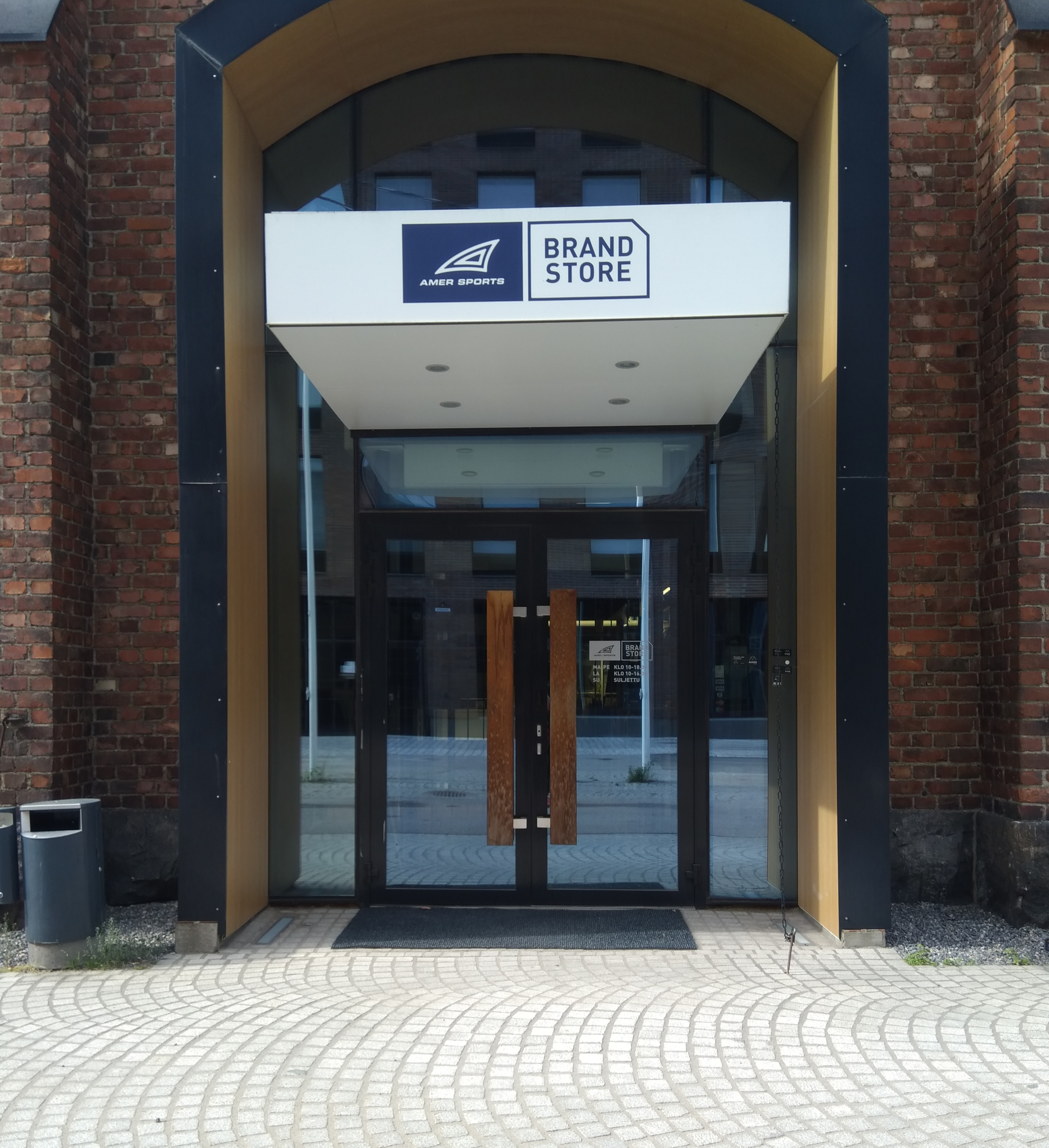
The entrance of Amer Sports in Helsinki, 2022

The company got involved in the sports equipment market starting in 1974. They bought the Finnish ice hockey gear maker Koho-Tuote in 1974, its North East US distributor Koho Sporting Goods Corporation in 1978, the Canadien hockey stick manufacturer Les Industries du Hockey Canadien Inc. as well as ice hockey protective equipment manufacturer in 1979. In 1986, Amer sold all their ice hockey related businesses but established a sports division after acquiring a majority stake in the golf equipment maker MacGregor Golf from Jack Nicklaus.

In 1988, Amer represented, among others, American tobacco giant Philip Morris and held a 62 percent share of the Finnish tobacco market. A movement called Klubi 88 made a statement at the AGM claiming that Amer was the single largest causer of cancer in Finland. It said that the sponsorships by "tobacco figureheads" Hjallis Harkimo, a sailor, and Keke Rosberg, a Formula 1 driver, should be stopped. Amer's CEO Heikki O. Salonen thought sports products would be a better business for the company to focus on. The company's brands included Marlboro, Marimekko, Toyota, Weilin+Göös, and the American brand MacGregor Golf Company.

In February 1989, Amer acquired the Chicago-based company Wilson Sporting Goods Company, which specialized in golf, tennis, and baseball products. Wilson was the largest manufacturer of sports products in the US, but it was heavily indebted. The transaction set a new record for the largest foreign acquisition in Finland.

In 1991, Amer sold Marimekko to Kirsti Paakkanen. The company had incurred losses of approximately 50 million euros under Amer's ownership. Further acquisitions followed in the shape of the Austrian ski manufacturer Atomic in 1994 and the Finnish sports instrument maker Suunto in 1999. The American baseball and softball bat firm Demarini was purchased a year later, falling under the Wilson division. During this time, many of the business areas no longer deemed to be core were divested, although the company retained its tobacco business until 2004 when it was sold back to Philip Morris. In 2005, Amer acquired the outdoor sports company Salomon from Adidas for €485 million. In the same year, the company officially changed its name to Amer Sports Corporation.

In 2007, Amer Sports' North American headquarters were moved from Portland, Oregon to the historic American Can Company of Utah Building Complex in Ogden, Utah. In 2008 Amer Sports divided its operations into three business units: winter sport, outdoor sports, ball sports (Wilson, Louisville Slugger, and DeMarini).

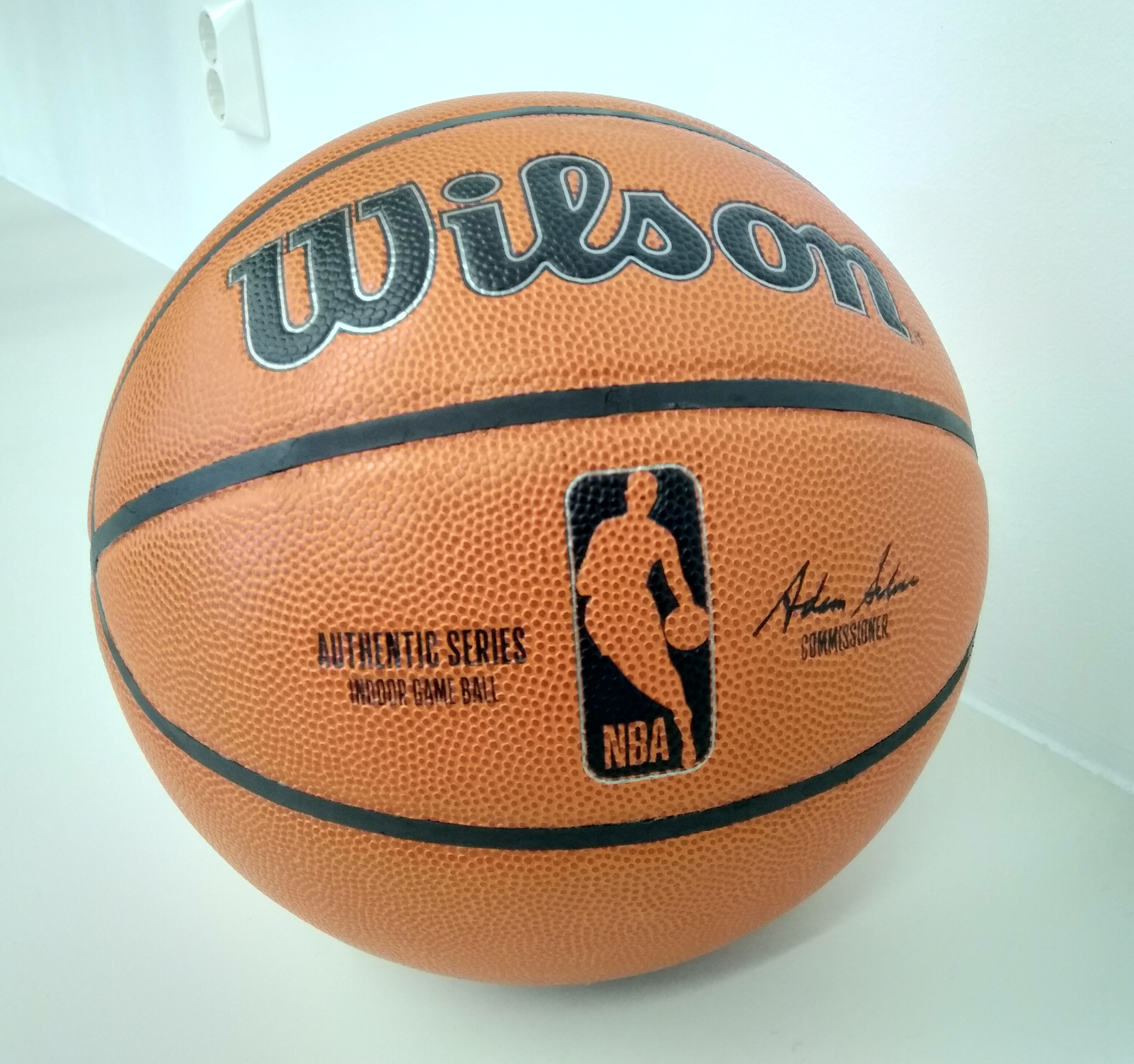
Wilson manufactures for example basketballs for NBA, 2022

In April 2018, Amer Sports acquired the Swedish sportswear manufacturer Peak Performance from IC Group, a Danish entity. Amer Sports' largest owners were Keva, the Civil and Water Engineering Fund, Ilmarinen, Mandatum and Ilkka Brotherus. In December, an investor consortium called Mascot Bidco, announced its takeover bid for Amer Sports. The consortium included ANTA Sports, FountainVest Partners, Anamered Investments, and Tencent. Amer Sports shares were valued at 4.6 billion euros, 40 percent over their average market value. Under the terms of the offer, Amer Sports remained a separate business entity, while Anta Sports provides R&D and production resources required for expansion on the Chinese market. Anta Sports is China's largest sportswear manufacturer. Chip Wilson, the founder of Lululemon Athletica, owns about one-fifth of Amer Sports. Amer Sports was among the largest companies on the Helsinki Stock Exchange, with a market capitalization of approximately 4 billion euros.

In 2019, Amer Sports completed its divestment of Mavic before selling it in 2020. In December 2020, Amer Sports sold Precor to the American exercise equipment manufacturer Peloton. In January 2022, it was reported that Amer Sports would sell Suunto to Liesheng, a Chinese company specializing in wearable technology. In February 2024, Amer Sports went public again through an initial public offering and was listed on the New York Stock Exchange. The company raised $1.4 billion in its offering and was valued at $6.5 billion.

== Organization ==
The company has offices in for example Finland, Poland, Germany, China and US and manufacturing and sales locations worldwide. Amer Sports is owned by Anta Sports, FountainVest Partners, Anamered Investments, and Tencent.

== Brands ==
Amer Sports operates multiple brands that it has acquired over the years.

- ATEC – Baseball and softball equipment
- Atomic – Skiing equipment and apparel
- Arc'teryx – Outdoor apparel for mountaineering and alpine sports
- Armada – Skiing equipment and apparel
- DeMarini – Baseball and softball bats
- EvoShield – Sports protective gear
- Louisville Slugger – Baseball bats
- Peak Performance – Skiing equipment and apparel
- Salomon – Outdoor apparel, running and hiking footwear, and winter sports equipment
- Wilson Sporting Goods – Sports equipment

== See also ==
- List of Finnish companies
- List of outdoor industry parent companies
