= Wilson ProStaff Original 6.0 =

Brand of tennis racquet

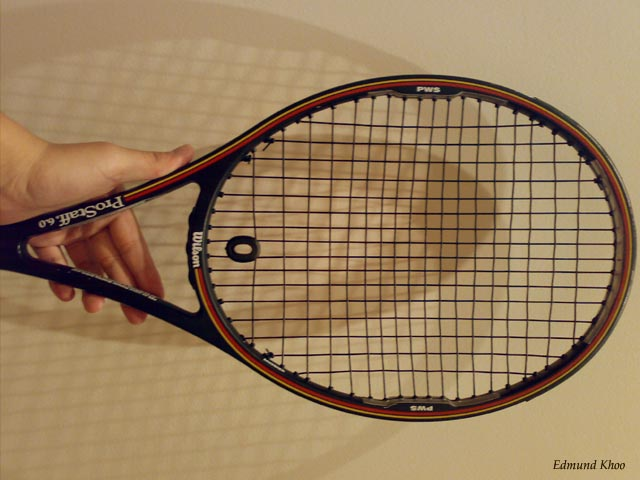
A Pro Staff 6.0. Note the lead taping placed at 3 and 9 o'clock to further increase weight and stability, as well as at 12 for added swingweight. This racquet has been strung with polyester strings. At the bottom of the stringbed is a Pete Sampras vibration damper.

The Wilson Pro Staff Original is a tennis racquet first introduced in 1984. It is most known for being the model of racquet used by Pete Sampras. For this reason, it is known as a “Sampo”.

== History ==
Originally manufactured in Chicago, Illinois and Saint Vincent and the Grenadines, the Pro Staff line was Wilson's answer to the Prince Graphite, Yonex Rex series, and the Dunlop Max 200G. The original graphite Pro Staff was 110 square inches (710 cm^{2}); the 85 sq in (550 cm^{2}), 95 sq in (610 cm^{2}), and 125 sq in (810 cm^{2}) sizes were developed from it. Pete Sampras used the Pro Staff 85 (graphite/Kevlar) for his entire professional career. Other first-rate players who have used the Pro Staff 85 Kevlar during their professional careers include Jimmy Connors, Jim Courier, Stefan Edberg, Chris Evert, Roger Federer, and Manuela Maleeva.

The first Pro Staff was the high-end Jack Kramer standard wooden model. It was stiffer than the extremely popular Jack Kramer Autograph model and favored by professional players for that reason. This racquet established the "Pro Staff" branding as being Wilson's finest product. However, as Wilson transitioned away from wood, steel, and aluminum, the company's first graphite models were not given this name.

Instead, early Wilson models were the 1980 Ultra, the 1981 Javelin, the 1982 Sting, and the graphite/boron Ultra II. As with the earlier Sting and Ultra II, the first graphite/Kevlar Pro Staff model was a "large head" 110 square-inch oversize. The Pro Staff design combined the braided construction of the earlier Ultra line with most of the shape of the Sting (that was produced without a throat bar). The Pro Staff models also were of medium stiffness, again reflecting a design philosophy that blended the Ultra II, which was very stiff, and the Sting, which was flexible. The stiffer and heavier Ultra II, not a member of the Pro Staff line, was Wilson's most expensive racquet until the 1987 Profile debuted.

Wilson produced many models with the Pro Staff mold, including the Jack Kramer Pro Staff 85 (80% graphite and 20% fiberglass), the Matrix, the Graphite Cruncher, the Graphite Aggressor, the Ceramic, and several others. These variants were less stiff than the graphite/Kevlar model. Chris Evert used the Jack Kramer model to reach the final of the 1984 French Open, in which she was defeated in straight sets by Martina Navratilova, who was using the Yonex R-27, a graphite/boron design similar to the Ultra II. She defeated Navratilova in 1985 with the graphite/Kevlar Pro Staff 85. Navratilova, meanwhile, had switched back to the less stiff R-22, a graphite/fiberglass model.

== Specifications ==
While the Pro Staff Original was a true midsize racket at 85 square inches in head size, it is however significantly smaller, heavier and thinner than almost all modern pro-level rackets, which tend to range around 95+ square inches in head size and 21+ mm in beam, and down toward the lower 300s in weight in grams for men and high 200s for women.

The Pro Staff 6.0 version was manufactured in four head sizes: 85, 95, 110, and 125 square inches. The 85 is unforgiving for the currently popular semi-western topspin style with its 12.6 ounces (360 g) weight and low power. The 95 is more forgiving of off-center shots with an overall weight of 12.2 ounces (350 g) and a lower swingweight (317 as opposed to the 85's 326). However, it has a higher flexibility, particularly in the upper hoop, due to its larger head size, which has been described as undesirably "whippy". Both have a 16x18 string pattern making the frame more open and easier to generate spin albeit the user must generate much of the spin's power with timing and wrist pronation. The Prostaff 6.0 also performs admirably well with flatter hitters (as evidenced by the success of Pete Sampras, Chris Evert, and Mary Pierce) as a result of its considerable heft and control. A flat hitting power-oriented game will therefore benefit considerably from the inherent control and stability of the frame. The small headsize of the 85 and Perimeter Weighting System also minimize the torque on off-centre hits, further enhancing control at impact.

The frame composition of the racquet is 80% graphite and 20% kevlar. The high percentage of graphite allows for a 'softer' feel, while the kevlar provides more strength in the frame. The graphite in the Pro Staff Original is braided. While more modern racquets consist of many pieces of graphite spliced to the framework of the racquet, the braided graphite construction of the Pro Staff Original was such that only a single, long piece of graphite is used, which is then 'braided' around the frame. This created more strength and stability in the racquet, while increasing the weight of the frame.

== Pete Sampras ==
While many top professionals receive custom-designed frames which differ from the stock version, Pete Sampras used production frames from the St Vincent factory, which he chose for their slightly greater stiffness. However, the handles were custom-built and lead was also added during balancing and weight work by his personal stringer, bringing the mass of the racket to just under 400 grams (14 oz). Sampras used natural gut, the norm for top professionals at that time, but the frames were strung at around 75 lbf (330 N) tension, well above the frame's stock recommended range of 50–60 lbf (220–270 N). Sampras also had all frames re-strung daily during tournaments, whether used or not.

Only upon returning to play exhibition, World Team Tennis and Senior Tour matches post retirement from the ATP, did Sampras switch rackets (to a similar model as that used by Roger Federer at the time) before Wilson produced a new model especially for Sampras, the K Pro Staff 88.

== Successor ==
Wilson has since produced numerous Pro Staff models, including some based closely on the design of the original. The "descendants" of the Pro Staff 6.0 usually bear the moniker 6.1 in the frame title and have incorporated larger head sizes 90–95 square inches (580–610 cm^{2}) and more modern graphite composites in their manufacturing, including the production of curved beam rackets instead of the traditional box beam design used in the original Pro Staffs. Most professionals using these rackets choose the 95-sq in head size, with the notable exception of Roger Federer. In recent years, Wilson has phased out the box beam for a more modern curved beam on most of the 6.1 rackets with the exception of the Tour/90 model, which retained the box beam design. However, in 2012 Wilson re-released the box beam design by separating the 6.1 rackets into two categories, 6.1 ProStaff (which retained the box beam design), and 6.1 (which kept the curved beam design). They further clarified the division in 2014, removing the "6.1" label and releasing the ProStaff as a stand-alone racket series.

In the 1990s, Wilson produced a range of lighter Pro Staff models called "Pro Staff Classic Lite." They featured larger head sizes (95 and 110 sq in) and a more flexible frame than either the 6.0 or the 6.1. The series produced Steffi Graf's racquets of choice in the 1990s as she signed an endorsement deal with Wilson in 1994 after having played with Dunlop since the beginning of her career. Graf first played with the 7.0 model, then switched to the 7.5 model in 1996 and finally to the 7.1 model in 1998, which she played until her retirement the following year.

Wilson produced the throwback [K]Pro Staff 88 in 2008, a Pete Sampras signature model, produced for Sampras post-retirement and which he has used in the Senior Tour and other events since its introduction. This model retained the thin 17 mm beam throughout its length but has increased weight from 12.6 to 12.8 oz (360 to 360 g) strung, is slightly less head-light (six points rather than eight), with an 88-square-inch (570 cm^{2}) head size, up from 85 in the Pro Staff Original (the Pro Staff 6.0 was produced in a number of sizes) and with 19 rather than 18 crosses in the string pattern (retaining the 16 mains). The material composition utilized nanotechnology to bond new molecules that fill spaces between the racket's graphite fibers (branded [K]arophite Black) to the graphite itself, rather than the unbonded fill used in Wilson's prior N-Code racket series. Most published reviews of this racket feel that the heavy weight and relatively small head size are ill-suited to modern stroke production techniques.

In 2012, Wilson reintroduced the Prostaff line with their Amplifeel series of rackets. Among the new rackets were 3 "Pro Staff" branded models: a 90, 95, and 100 square inch headsize. There has been a noticeable difference in swing-weight in these rackets, with the 90 having a 327 swing-weight, the 95 having a 306 swing-weight, and the 100 having a 304 swing-weight. The more modern Pro Staffs have also a reduction in weight; the 95 and 100 boast 11.5 and 11.3 oz strung weight, respectively. In comparison, the original Pro Staffs were very heavy, at 12+ oz.

The frames of the latest 2014 Pro Staff models feature graduated lines at 3 and 9 o'clock, prompting players to customize the rather low stock racquet weight with lead tapes.

Federer has since switched to a larger, 97 sq inch headsize racket for the 2014 season, and such the ProStaff line is expecting a major update in the design of the racket. Federer's new Prostaff removes the box beam in favor of a modern, angular beam. However, Wilson claims the same production and materials have been used in this racket line, blending the iconic Prostaff's graphite and kevlar blend with a modern design process. The new line of Prostaff is expected to be released fall 2014.

== Re-release ==
Wilson reintroduced the ProStaff Original 6.0 85 in May 2011 via an exclusive arrangement with Tennis Warehouse in the USA. The main differences on the new release are:

1. The gold BLX butt cap in place of the original white & red butt cap.
2. Stiffness RA rating lowered from the original stiffer 67 to a flexier 62 as listed on Tennis Warehouse web site.

The ProStaff Original 6.0 85 maintains a large enough following to continue as one of their best selling racquets as of December 2013.

== Sources ==
- Wilson Racquet Products
- Tennis Warehouse: K Factor KPro Staff 88
- Reviews
- Features
- Pro-Staff Original
- Wilson Tennis Racquets
- Tennis Warehouse Reviews
- Pro-Staff Origins
