= Peak Performance (clothing brand) =

Swedish sportswear company

- Type: Subsidiary
- Industry: Technical apparel
- Founded: 1986
- Founder: Stefan Engström; Peter Blom; Christer Mårtensson
- Headquarters: Stockholm, Sweden
- Number of locations: 30 branded stores; 11 outlets; 32 franchise stores
- Area served: Worldwide
- Number of employees: 505 globally (2026)
- Parent: Amer Sports
- Website: peakperformance.com

Peak Performance is a Swedish sports clothing brand specializing in ski and hiking clothing. The brand was founded in 1986, in Åre, Sweden, and is headquartered in Stockholm, Sweden.

The company's name "Peak Performance" reflects the brand's focus on creating technical apparel for performance in a variety of skiing conditions including freeride, piste, and freestyle.

== History ==
The brand was founded in 1986 by professional skiers Stefan Engström, Peter Blom and Christer Mårtensson in Åre.

In 1998 it was bought by the Danish company Carli Gry International, later part of the IC Group.

In 1999, the brand relocated its headquarters to the Frihamnen port area of Stockholm, Sweden, where its global design teams are based.

In 2018, the brand was acquired by Amer Sports, and in 2019, the brand became part of Chinese Anta Sports' portfolio when Anta led a consortium that purchased Amer Sports.

== Products ==
The brand was founded by professional freeriders but now creates garments with specific features for multiple ski disciplines (including piste, freeride, freestyle and touring). The brand also produces hiking apparel and insulated jackets, including the "Helium Jacket."

Peak Performance has an internal research and development program. Over the years, the brand has received innovation awards, including ISPO Awards for Elevate (2024) and Helium Loop (2025), which cited the products' sustainability features and circular production principles. The brand has also referenced color psychology in its design approach to create garments in more natural colors than typical skiwear.

== Athletes, competition and sponsorship ==
Peak Performance has sponsored ski athletes and competitions since its founding. The Peak Performance Ski Team includes a roster of professional athletes, including Freeride World Tour (FWT) champions Hedvig Wessel, Justine Dufour-Lapointe, Kristofer Turdell, and Elisabeth Gerritzen. The brand is the title sponsor of the Freeride World Tour (FWT), a global ski competition which takes place on off-piste terrain.
