= Armada (company) =

Manufacturer of ski related projects based in Park City, Utah

Armada Skis
- Company type: Subsidiary
- Industry: Sports equipment
- Founded: 2002; 24 years ago
- Headquarters: Park City, Utah, United States
- Area served: Worldwide
- Products: freestyle skis, clothing
- Parent: Amer Sports
- Website: armadaskis.com

Armada is an American manufacturer of skis, ski boots, poles, technical outerwear and skiing-related softgoods, based in Park City, Utah with a European office in Innsbruck, Austria. The company's products are sold in over forty countries worldwide through wholly owned subsidiaries and distributors.

== History ==
Armada was founded in 2002 by a group of professional skiers and the ski and snowboard photographer Chris O'Connell, with backing from British venture capitalists. Its founding team of owner-riders consisted of Tanner Hall, the late JP Auclair, JF Cusson, Julien Regnier, Eric Iberg and Boyd Easley. They launched with 2 freestyle skis, the AR5 and ARV.

Armada moved in 2014 from the founding home base of Costa Mesa to Park City, Utah. Erik Snyder, former CEO of Armada was quoted saying "The combination of Utah's business environment and abundance of world-class skiing make Summit County the ideal home for Armada's future."

On March 29, 2017, Armada was acquired by Finnish winter sports conglomerate Amer Sports for $4.1 million.

== Company ==
Armada bills itself as skiing's first rider-owned, rider-operated manufacturer. It works closely with ski professionals, who design their own products and are rewarded with equity in the company. Armada is known to the general public largely due to its association with multiple-time Winter X Games champion Tanner Hall, who is a founding team rider. In addition, Armada is credited with helping to shift mainstream perception of skiing in a younger, more dynamic direction through its unusual graphics and savvy marketing. It operates online stores in the US, Canada, France, and Germany. In 2011 it announced a partnership with fabric makers Gore.

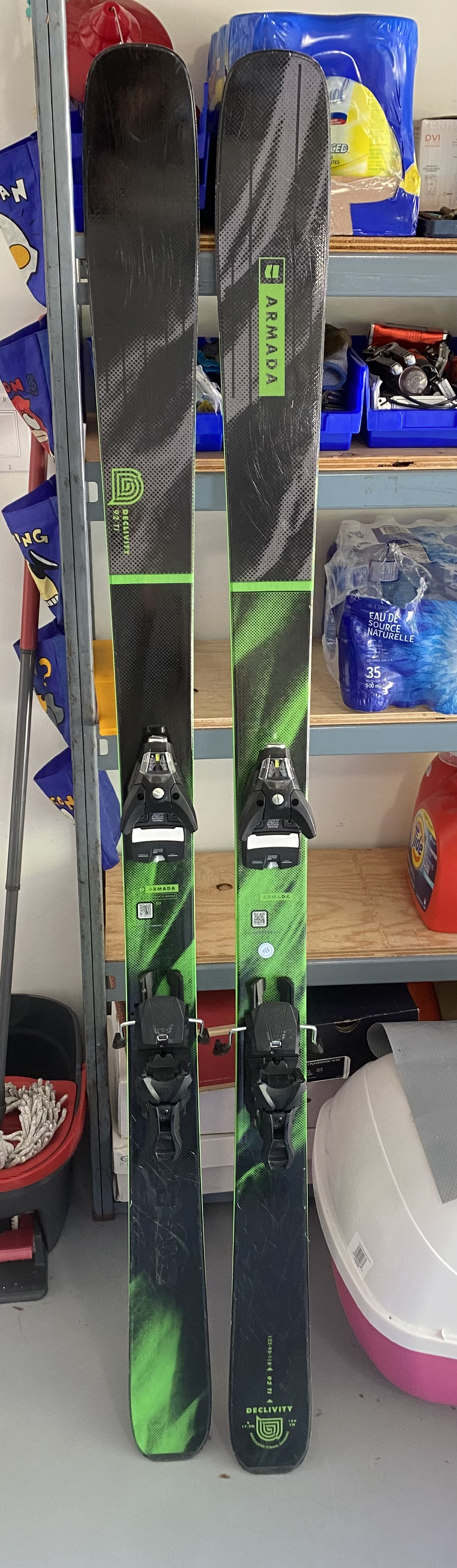
2023 Armada Declivity 92ti skis

== Team ==
Armada's current pro team consists of Tanner Hall, Jacob Wester, Phil Casabon, Mike Hornbeck, Riley Leboe, Torin Yater-Wallace, Kim Boberg, Henrik Harlaut and Sammy Carlson

== Products ==
Products for the 2020/2021 season include skis, poles, bindings, ski wear and accessories. The ski includes lineup includes for men the ARV, Declivity, JJ, Whitewalker, Stranger, Edollo, BDOG, ARG III, Magic J and Tracer. Women's skis include the ARW, Trace and Victa. Children's skis include the ARV, ARW, Tantrum, Bantam and Kirti. The JJ is claimed as being "the first all-mountain powder ski with rocker".
