= Atec =

American Aerospace Company

Atec, Inc.
- "Support Solutions for Aerospace and Energy"
- Type: Public
- Traded as: ATCN
- Industry: Aerospace; Defense; Space; Energy
- Founded: 1953
- Headquarters: Stafford, Texas, USA
- Number of locations: 10
- Products: Engine Test Cells; Hush Houses; Control Cabs; Data Acquisition Systems; Engine Support Equipment; Cryogenic Rocket Valves; Spaceflight Components; Downhole Tools; Surface Equipment; Large Weldments
- Brands: Celtech; Hager Machine & Tool; Vital Link
- Number of employees: 302 (2018)

Atec, Inc. specializes in the design, manufacture, construction and maintenance of precision components, large fabrications, systems and facilities. Atec provides solutions for low to medium volume requirements involving engine test, aero support equipment, spaceflight components, and energy service products. Over 20,000 Atec products have been used by the United States Armed Forces and others, including the Federal Aviation Administration. Atec was named NASA Small Business Subcontractor of the Year for 2016, in recognition of contributions to NASA and Boeing Manned Spaceflight Programs.

== History ==
=== Accurate Instrument Co. founding ===
Atec was founded in 1953 as Accurate Instrument Co. and was officially incorporated in the state of Texas on July 13, 1956. Accurate Instrument Co. primarily manufactured instrumentation for the aviation industry. Some notable products included a standard day instrument (used to provide automated correlations to standard sea level atmospheric conditions), signal generators, frequency counters, oscillators, and pressure test sets.

=== Company rebrand (1960s) ===
In the 1960s, Accurate Instrument Co. was renamed Atec, Inc., in concert with a shift from custom instrumentation to aerospace and energy equipment, such as hush houses, jet engine test stands, spaceflight components, control systems, exploration surface equipment and wireline tools. Atec operates to ISO 9001, AS 9100D and ISO 14001 standards.

=== Acquisitions ===
Since its founding, Atec has made many notable acquisitions. The company acquired oil patch systems company, Lymco Electronics in 1976 and Kestran, the energy service manufacturing company in 1989.

In 2013, Atec acquired Celtech, a manufacturer of jet and turboprop engine test stands, in addition to with Space Corp. In 2016, the company acquired Hager Machine & Tool, a machine shop specializing in precision components for Petroleum Industry, Hydraulic, Air Tool, and Heavy industry customers. A year later, Atec acquired Vital Link, a jet-engine testing firm.

== Notable spaceflight programs ==
- RL10 cryogenic flow control valves

Atec has manufactured, assembled, and tested cryogenic flow control valves for the RL10 liquid-fueled rocket engine since 1995. The RL10 is currently used on the Centaur upper stage on both the United Launch Alliance Atlas V and Delta IV launch vehicles, and is planned for use on the Vulcan Centaur launch vehicle. Northrop Grumman has recently indicated plans to utilize the RL10 on their Omega rocket.

As of December 2017, Atec-manufactured valves have flown on 140 consecutive successful flights. Notable RL10 missions which launched with Atec-manufactured valves include NASA's New Horizons probe to Pluto, the LCROSS Lunar Impactor, and the Orion Exploration Flight Test 1.

- International Space Station and Crew Capsule components

Adapter Plate Installed on Expedition 50.

In 2013, Atec began work on 27 lithium-ion battery adapter plates to be used on the International Space Station. The electrical system of the International Space Station previously used 48 nickel–hydrogen (Ni–H2) batteries, which are being replaced with 24 lithium-ion batteries, built by Aerojet Rocketdyne. Six adapter plates were launched on HTV-6 in December, 2016. These adapter plates were installed by Peggy Whitson, Shane Kimbrough, and Thomas Pesquet over the course of two spacewalks in 2017 as part of Expedition 50.

Atec, from a 2015 contract, began designing and manufacturing an electrical polarity and flow control unit for the next generation Crew Capsule, which will carry astronauts to the ISS and other manned-flight destinations.

- Development and legacy liquid propulsion components

Atec is a participant on several new development and heritage rocket engine programs including the AR1 and RS-25 engines.

== Notable engine test and support programs ==
- Jet and turboprop engine test stand repair contract

In 2013, the United States Air Force and Warner Robins Air Logistics Complex awarded Atec a 5-year repair and support contract for A/M37T-20 & A/M37T-21 type test stands worldwide. Such test cells are in broad use for intermediate level test of F100, F101, F110, F119, F124, F125, F135, F404, F414, J79, J85, TF30, TF33, TF34, TFE731, T38, T53, T56, 501D, AE2100, PT6, CT7, TPE331, PW100s, W-M601, MK532/6, AI-24T and other military aircraft turbine engines. Renewed in 2018 for 5 more years, this IDIQ contract includes 24/7 hotline support, procurement, shipment, and on-site repairs in support of the United States Air Force.

- Small turbine engine test cells

Atec has designed and manufactured many modular turbine test cells for APU, turboshaft, and turbojet engines. Notably, Atec designed and fielded 2 modular, regenerative turboshaft test cells for Rolls-Royce. These test cells were developed for the M250 engine and were tailored to Rolls-Royce's Indianapolis production facility. Typical turboshaft test cells often utilize a water brake or other type of dynamometer to place a load on the engine, absorbing (and wasting) the produced energy. The Atec test cells use 500 hp electric generators to convert the rotational energy of the turboshaft into electrical energy. This allows Rolls-Royce to power the engine facility and sell excess generated power back to the Electric utility. Other electric regenerative system installations include those for Bell and Bristow. Atec, Celtech and Vital Link Europe are also very active in worldwide helicopter and APU test cells.

- Large turbine engine test cells

Atec has designed and constructed multiple large turbine engine test cells. One notable example was contracted by Kalitta Air. This 10-meter Tilt up concrete engine test cell is rated at 100,000 pounds of thrust and is sized for testing Pratt & Whitney JT9D, 1000G, 2000, 4000, V2500, and GP7000 series; General Electric CF-6, CF-34, CFM-56, smaller GE-90, GEnx, LEAP, and CFM-56; Rolls-Royce RB211 and smaller Trent engines. This test cell is 240 feet long by 33 feet wide. The inlet height is 45 feet, and the exhaust is expelled at a height of 56 feet. Recent large turbofan projects include a data acquisition system in Zurich and an eight-meter test cell in Miami.

- Noise suppressors / hush houses

In 2011, Atec was awarded a contract for the relocation of multiple T-9 noise suppressor test cells from Aviano Air Base and Cannon Air Force Base to Tinker Air Force Base. This effort included design of engine test equipment to accommodate the Pratt & Whitney F135 engine (used in the Joint Strike Fighter Lockheed Martin F-35 Lightning II) in these upgraded T-9 test cells.

- Turbofan Phoenix test cell

In 2016, Duncan Aviation selected Atec to design, manufacture and field a Phoenix Series Modular Turbofan Engine Test Cell rated for 20,000 lb. thrust class engines. This environmentally friendly test cell will be used primarily for MRO testing in response to Duncan Aviation's designation as a Honeywell TFE731 Heavy Maintenance Facility. Duncan Aviation and Atec jointly announced this program at the National Business Aviation Association Conference, 2016. The cell was completed in August 2018.

== Locations ==
Atec, Inc.

- Stafford / SW Houston, Fort Bend County, Texas, United States
- Midwest City, Oklahoma County, Oklahoma, United States
- Minneapolis, Hennepin County, Minnesota, United States
- Singapore

Celtech Corp.

- Carlsbad, Eddy County, New Mexico, United States

Hager Machine & Tool, Inc.

- Houston, Harris County, Texas, United States

Vital Link, Inc.

- Sealy, Austin County, Texas, United States
- Camberley, Surrey, England
- Dubai, United Arab Emirates
- Istanbul, Turkey
