= Arc'teryx =

Canadian outdoor apparel and equipment brand

Arc'teryx Equipment Inc
- Type: Subsidiary
- Industry: Technical apparel
- Founded: 1989 as Rock Solid; 1991 as Arc'teryx
- Founders: Dave Lane (Rock Solid); Jeremy Guard (Arc'teryx)
- Headquarters: North Vancouver, British Columbia, Canada
- Number of locations: 80+ branded stores; 3,000+ retailers
- Area served: Worldwide
- Number of employees: 1,200 globally (2020)
- Parent: Amer Sports
- Divisions: PRO; LEAF; Veilance
- Website: arcteryx.com

Arc'teryx is a Canadian company specializing in outdoor apparel and equipment headquartered in North Vancouver, British Columbia. It focuses on technical apparel for mountaineering and alpine sports, including related accessories. The company's name and logo reference the Archaeopteryx, the transitional fossil of early dinosaurs to birds. Arc'teryx is known for its waterproof Gore-Tex shell jackets and down parkas.

Founded in 1989 in North Vancouver as Rock Solid, the company re-branded in 1991 as Arc'teryx to produce outerwear and climbing gear for the Coast Mountains in Canada. The company was sold to Salomon Group in 2001 and Amer Sports in 2005. Arc'teryx maintains three divisions: Veilance (luxury streetwear), LEAF (law enforcement and military), and PRO (ski patrol). The company is an influence in the "gorpcore" and "normcore" fashion movements, the wearing of minimalist, technical apparel in urban settings. The brand is colloquially known as "dead bird".

== History ==
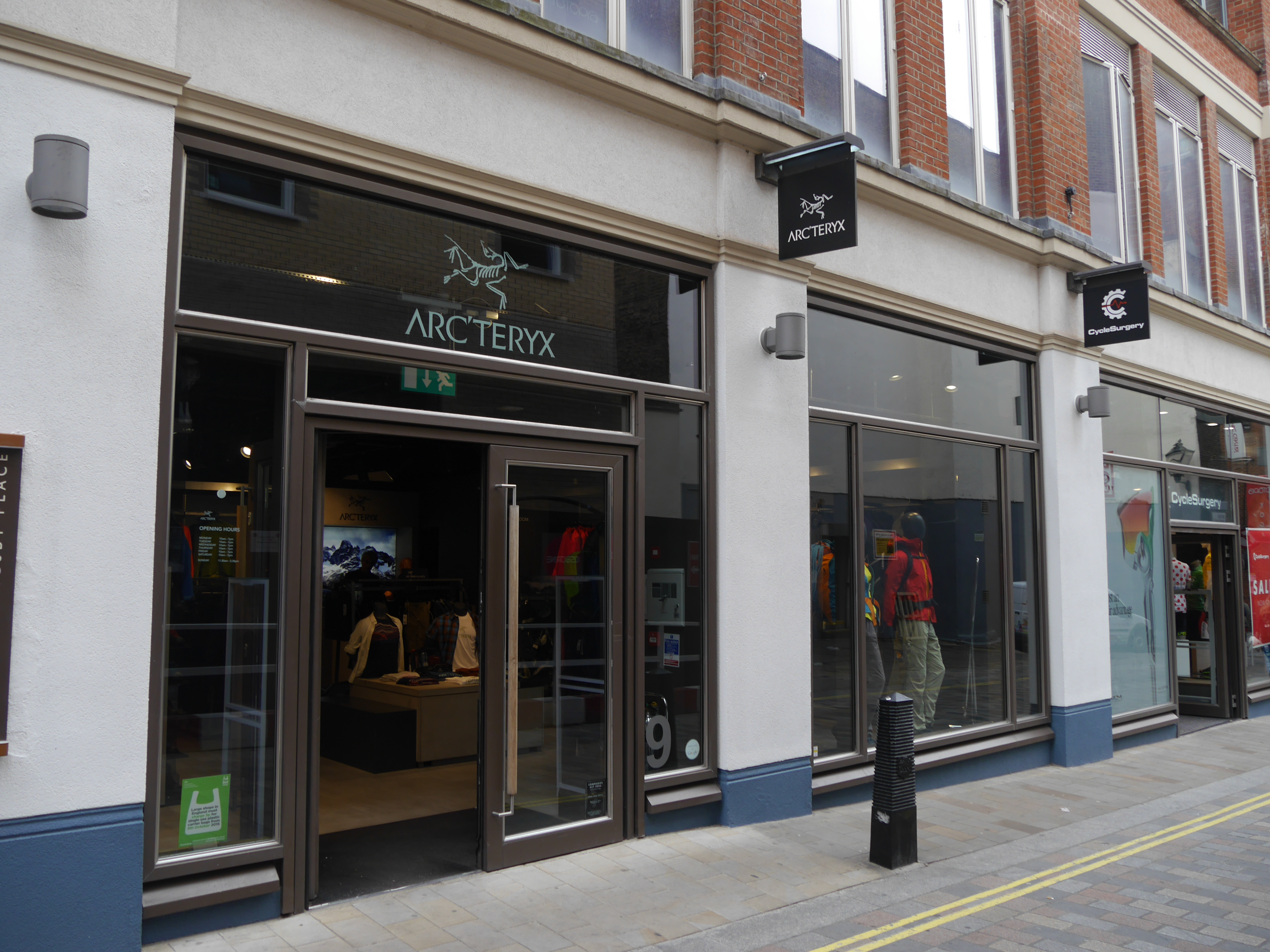
An Arc'teryx boutique on Mercer Street, London in July 2016

Originally named "Rock Solid" by co-founder Dave Lane, the company's first line of products was climbing gear. In 1990 Dave Lane sold a 50% interest in Rock Solid to Blair Murdoch and Tim Duholke and his other 50% to Jeremy Guard, and they later changed the company name to Arc'teryx in 1991. The name and logo reference the Archaeopteryx, the transitional fossil of early dinosaurs to modern dinosaurs (birds). Guard chose the name to represent the idea of accelerating evolution as characterized by the geologic time scale of fossils. Guard was president and principal of the company from 1991 to 2001. Using a heat laminate (thermolamination) technology, the partners designed and marketed the Vapor harness, which would become the company's most popular item. In 1993, after a series of relocations and staff additions, Arc'teryx released the Bora backpack using the same Vapor technology. In 1996, the company introduced technical apparel featuring Gore-Tex after obtaining licenses from W. L. Gore & Associates. Arc'teryx re-located its headquarters to Burnaby, British Columbia, in 1999 and then to North Vancouver in 2005.

In 2001, Arc'teryx was purchased by Salomon Group, a French subsidiary of the German retailer Adidas. In 2005, Arc'teryx was sold to Finnish retailer Amer Sports. In 2019, Chinese retailer Anta Sports bought a controlling stake (56%) in Amer. As their apparel line expanded Arc'teryx began manufacturing in international markets, specifically in China, the Philippines, Vietnam, Bangladesh, El Salvador, Laos, and Greece. Since the early 2020s, Arc'teryx has co-produced collections with high-fashion brands and designers which expanded their consumer market beyond outdoor enthusiasts.

On September 22, 2025, Arc'teryx launched a fireworks display in Tibet, The Rising Dragon, as part of a marketing campaign which resulted in controversy over its potential environmental effects in Shigatse.

== Divisions ==
Their garments, accessories, and apparel are organized into various product families and collections, all aimed at different aspects of mountain activities:

- Veilance: their luxury formal streetwear line was founded in 2009, branded as Arc'teryx Veilance.
- PRO: their gear line aimed at professionals on ski patrol and in search-and-rescue capacities.
- LEAF: their Law Enforcement and Armed Forces (LEAF) line is aimed at the military and police market.

== Subculture ==
Arc'teryx is seen as a high-end status symbol among youth, "just shy of Stone Island and Moncler." The Financial Times noted one of their largest demographics as "urbanites" in 2022. Labeled a cult brand by Fast Company in 2021, Arc'teryx is worn by "[both] hikers and hype-beasts" according to The New York Times.

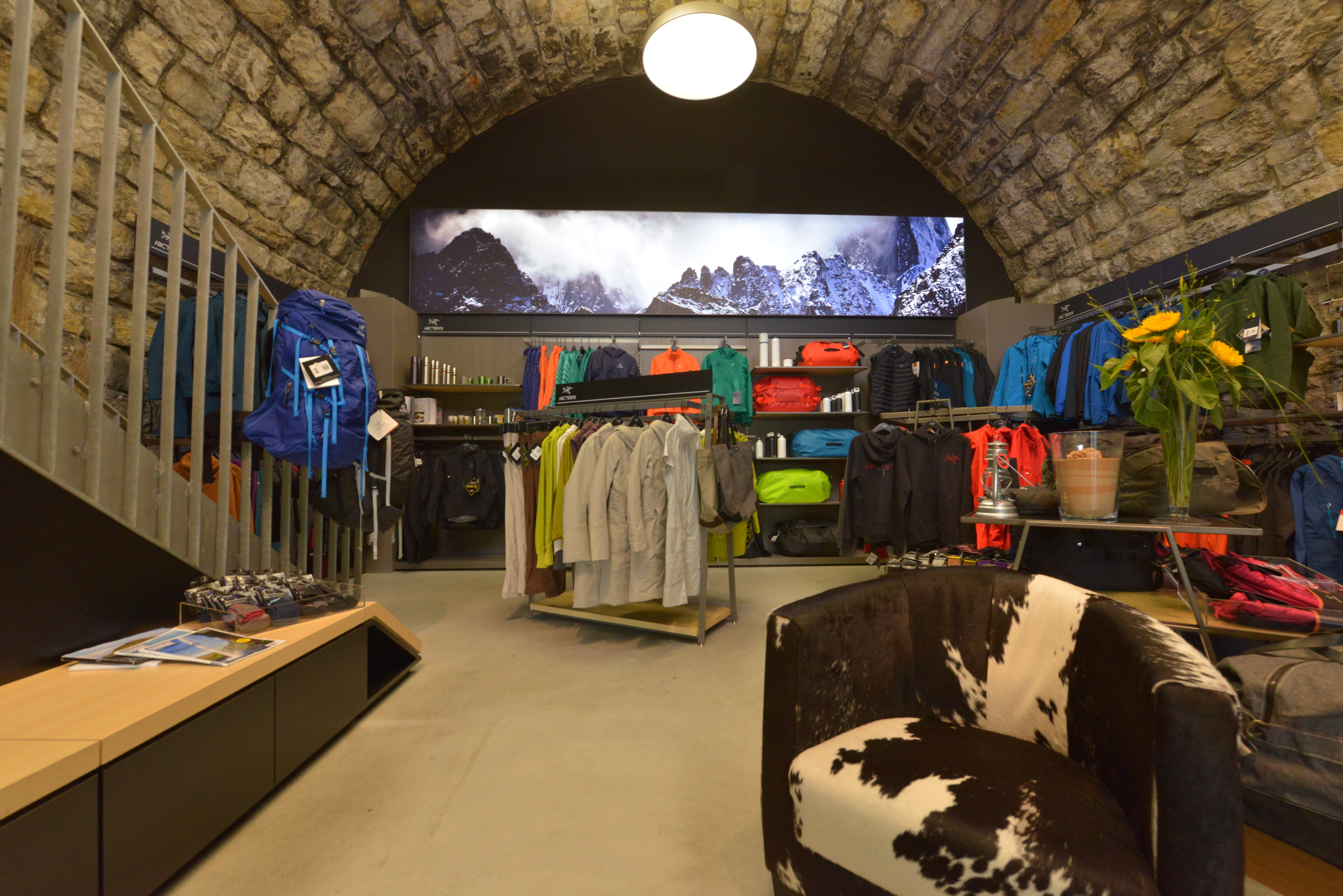
Interior of Arc'teryx store in Zürich, Switzerland.

The company is a major influence in the "gorpcore" and "normcore" fashion movements – the wearing of minimalist, outdoor apparel in urban settings, along with Mammut, REI, Marmot and Patagonia. Throughout 2022, a TikTok trend emerged where individuals would shower, fully clothed with an Arc'teryx jacket, as British rapper YT's song "Arc'teryx" played in the background. Arc'teryx is a staple of Generation Z and zillennial fashion, particularly in the U.S. and Canada. Luxury fashion houses that have minimalist aesthetics collaborate with Arc'teryx to produce capsule collections, according to The New York Times and GQ.

== See also ==
- Moncler, Stone Island, and Canada Goose
- Streetwear and minimalist fashion
- List of outdoor industry parent companies
- Coast Mountains and Canadian Arctic tundra
