= DeMarini =

American sports equipment manufacturer

DeMarini Sports, Inc.

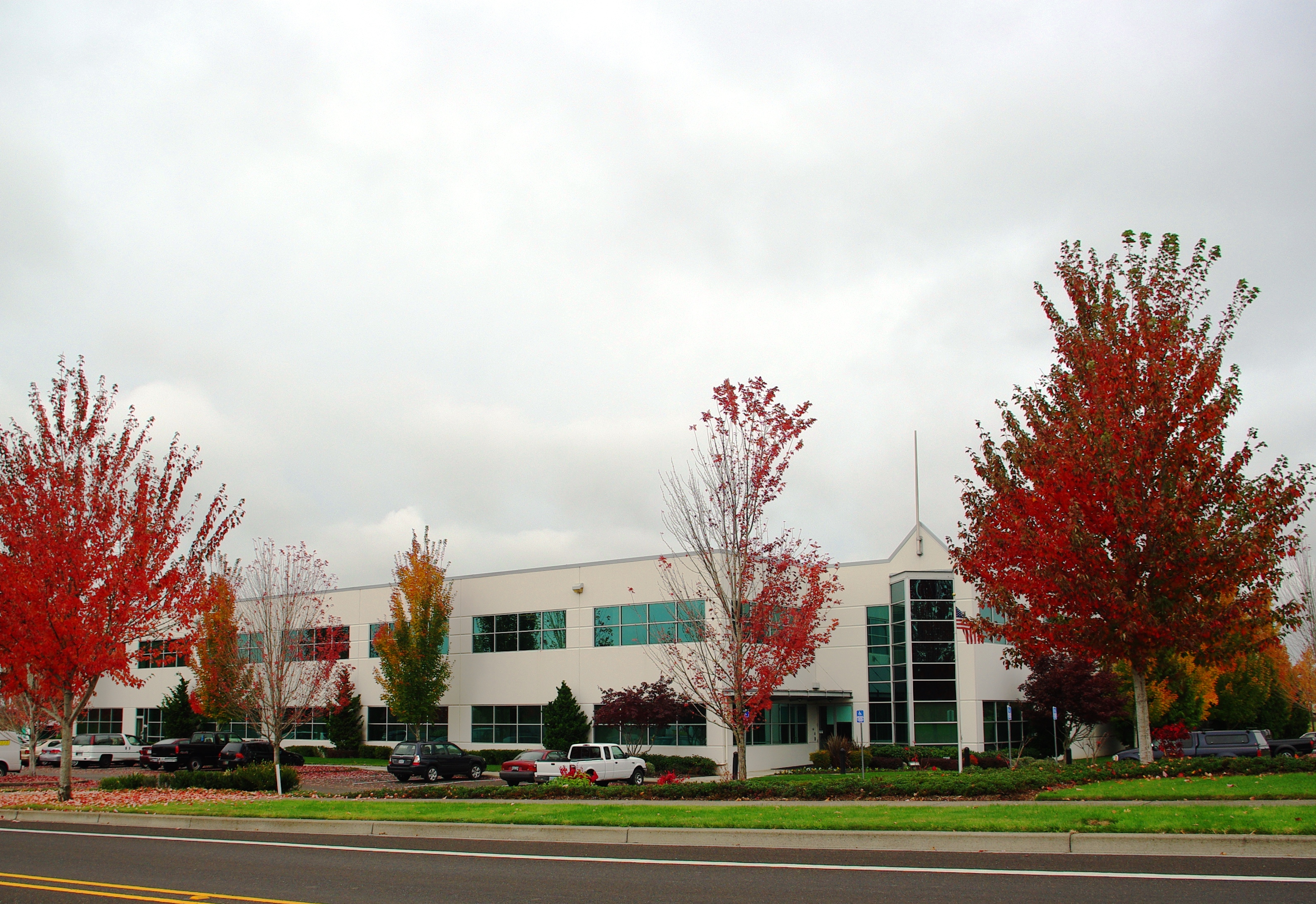
- Company headquarters in Hillsboro, Oregon
- Company type: Subsidiary
- Industry: Sports equipment
- Founded: 1989; 37 years ago
- Founder: Ray DeMarini
- Headquarters: 45.5660°N 122.90668°W, Hillsboro, Oregon, United States
- Products: Baseball bats, batting gloves
- Owner: Amer Sports
- Parent: Wilson
- Website: demarini.com

DeMarini Sports, Inc. is an American manufacturer of sports equipment headquartered in Hillsboro, Oregon, United States. The company is known for producing baseball and softball bats and batting gloves. They are known for bats such as the “CF” and the “Voodoo One”.

DeMarini is a subsidiary of Wilson Sporting Goods Co.

== History ==
Ray DeMarini founded the company in New York in 1990, introducing a "high-tech" softball bat. The company's introduction of double wall bats, and the increased power they provided, drew praise and propelled the company's success, but also prompted concern over bat safety. Sales surpassed 10,000 bats annually in the mid-1990s.

Acquired by Wilson Sporting Goods in 2000, DeMarini continues to research, design, and build bats in its Hillsboro, Oregon facility. In 2012, the company expanded the business by adding softball and baseball apparel.

== Products ==
DeMarini's Doublewall technology employs two independent walls to create a springboard hitting surface, extending the center of percussion along the length of the barrel. They also produce bats, such as the Nitro and Diablo, with a single wall. Most Demarini little league bats come in -11,-12, and -13 weight drop. Most senior league bats come in -8. All adult bats are sold as -3 weight drop. The most common bat is the CF series and the Voodoo series. This bat started as the F2. Other innovations include aluminum-carbon hybrid bats. The company is unlike many of its competitors, who produce bats abroad.

More than 150 college baseball programs use Demarini bats, including Oregon State University, the repeat College World Series Champions in 2006, 2007, 2018, and 2009 CWS champion Louisiana State University. The 2007 National Collegiate Athletic Association Division II and III championship teams also used DeMarini equipment. A 2005 headline in a New Jersey newspaper referred to DeMarini bats as the "Mercedes of baseball bats".

Among other bat producers, DeMarini has been involved in increased marketing to Little League Baseball players that has been met with criticism.

== See also ==
- List of companies based in Oregon
