= Wilson Sporting Goods =

American athletic equipment company

Wilson Sporting Goods Company
- Formerly: Ashland Manufacturing Company (1913–31)
- Type: Private (1913–67); Subsidiary (1967–present)
- Industry: Sports equipment
- Founded: 1913; 113 years ago
- Founder: Thomas E. Wilson
- Fate: Acquired by Ling-Temco-Vought in 1967, then other owners
- Headquarters: Chicago, Illinois, U.S.
- Products: Balls, rackets, shuttlecocks, uniforms, apparel
- Brands: Wilson Staff; Louisville Slugger
- Net income: $930 million (2010)
- Number of employees: 1,600
- Parent: Amer Sports
- Subsidiaries: DeMarini; EvoShield; Hillerich & Bradsby
- Website: wilson.com

The Wilson Sporting Goods Company is an American sports equipment manufacturer based in Chicago, Illinois. Wilson makes equipment for many sports, among them baseball, badminton, American football, basketball, fastpitch softball, golf, racquetball, soccer, squash, tennis, pickleball, and volleyball.

The company has been an independent subsidiary of multinational retailer Amer Sports since 1989. Amer Sports is a subsidiary of multinational retailer Anta Sports since 2018, a Chinese sports equipment multinational corporation headquartered in Jinjiang, China.

== History ==
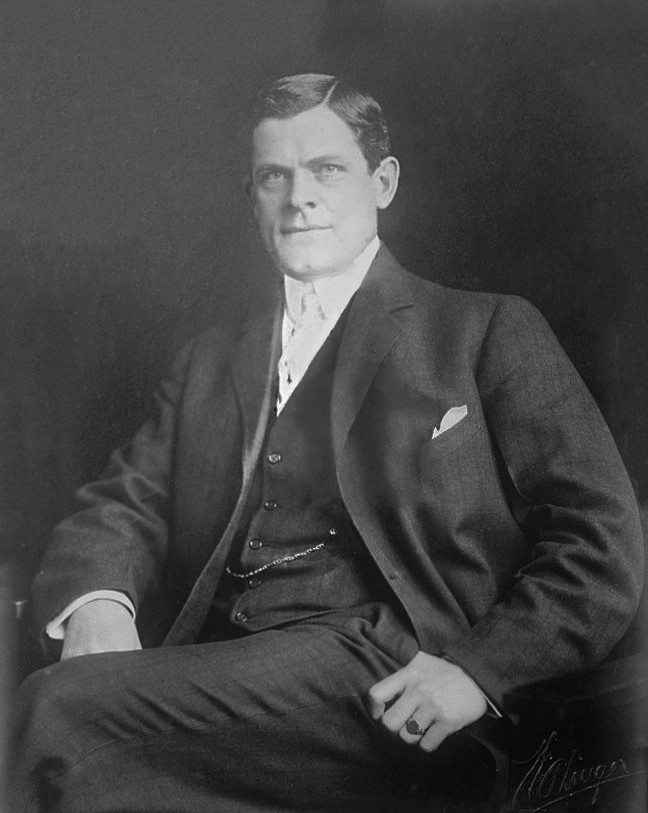
Thomas Wilson founded the company, also serving as its president and chairman for 35 years.

The company traces its roots to the "Schwarzschild & Sulzberger" meatpacking company (later changed to "Sulzberger & Son's") based in New York, that operated meat packing slaughterhouses.

Sulzberger & Son's founded the "Ashland Manufacturing Company" in 1913 to use animal by-products from its slaughterhouses. It started out in 1914, making tennis racket strings, violin strings, and surgical sutures, but soon expanded into baseball shoes and tennis racquets.

In 1915, Thomas E. Wilson, former president of meatpacker Morris & Company, was appointed president by the controlling banks and renamed the company "Thomas E. Wilson Company". The company acquired the Hetzinger Knitting Mills to produce athletic uniforms and a caddie bag company which produced golf balls but soon expanded into footballs and basketballs.

In 1918, Wilson left to concentrate on the beef-packing business, changing the Sulzberger company to Wilson & Co. (which would ultimately become Iowa Beef Packers and then be taken over by Tyson Foods). The packing company continued to have control in the company until 1967 when it was sold to Ling-Temco-Vought.

Under new president Lawrence Blaine Icely, it acquired the "Chicago Sporting Goods Company" and struck a deal to supply the Chicago Cubs. It also hired Arch Turner, a leather designer who would design the leather football.

In 1922, it introduced the Ray Schalk catcher's mitt which later became the standard. It worked with Knute Rockne to introduce the double-lined leather football and first valve football and the first waist-line football pants with pads. In 1925, it was renamed "Wilson-Western Sporting Goods" following a distribution agreement with "Western Sporting Goods".

After Rockne's death, the company focused on golf, introducing the R-90, a sand wedge golf club inspired by Gene Sarazen's victory in the 1932 British Open.

In 1931, it renamed itself "Wilson Sporting Goods Company". During World War II it introduced the Wilson Duke football, featuring high-quality leather, ends that were hand-sewn, lock-stitch seams, and triple lining, which was adopted as the official ball of the National Football League in 1941; this partnership between Wilson and NFL has continued since.

Horween Leather Company has supplied Wilson with pebbled cowhide since 1941 for use in the manufacture of footballs and basketballs. Wilson is Horween Leather Company's largest customer.

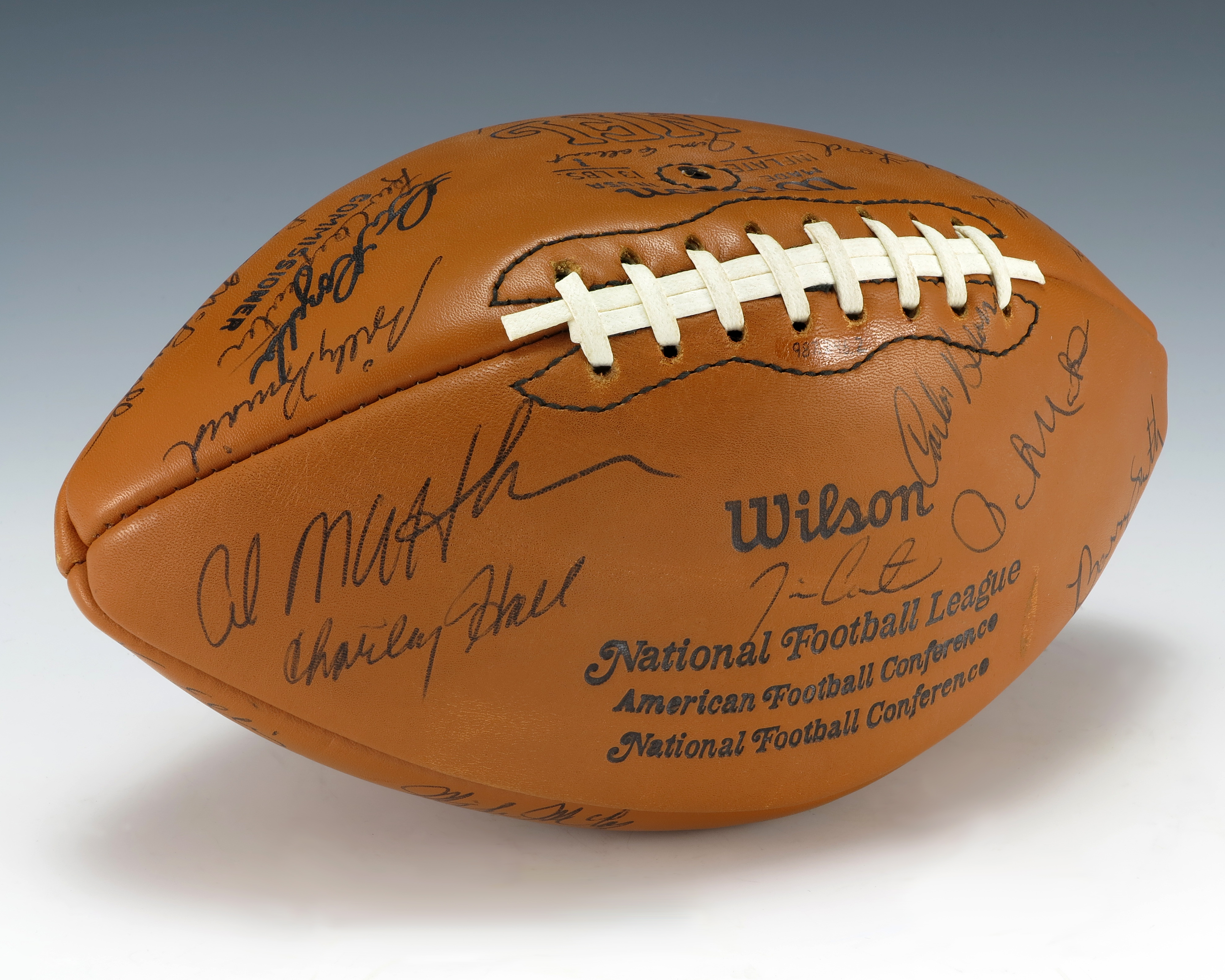
Wilson American football signed by the Green Bay Packers in 1975. Wilson became official supplier of the NFL in 1941.

In 1946, Wilson became the official game ball supplier of the newly-formed Basketball Association of America (BAA; the forerunner league of what would eventually become today's NBA). This partnership would last 37 years, until 1983.

After World War II, Wilson focused on tennis and signed Jack Kramer, who developed its line of Jack Kramer signed tennis rackets. L. B. Icely died in 1950, but the company continued to expand. In 1955, it acquired Ohio-Kentucky Manufacturing for making footballs.

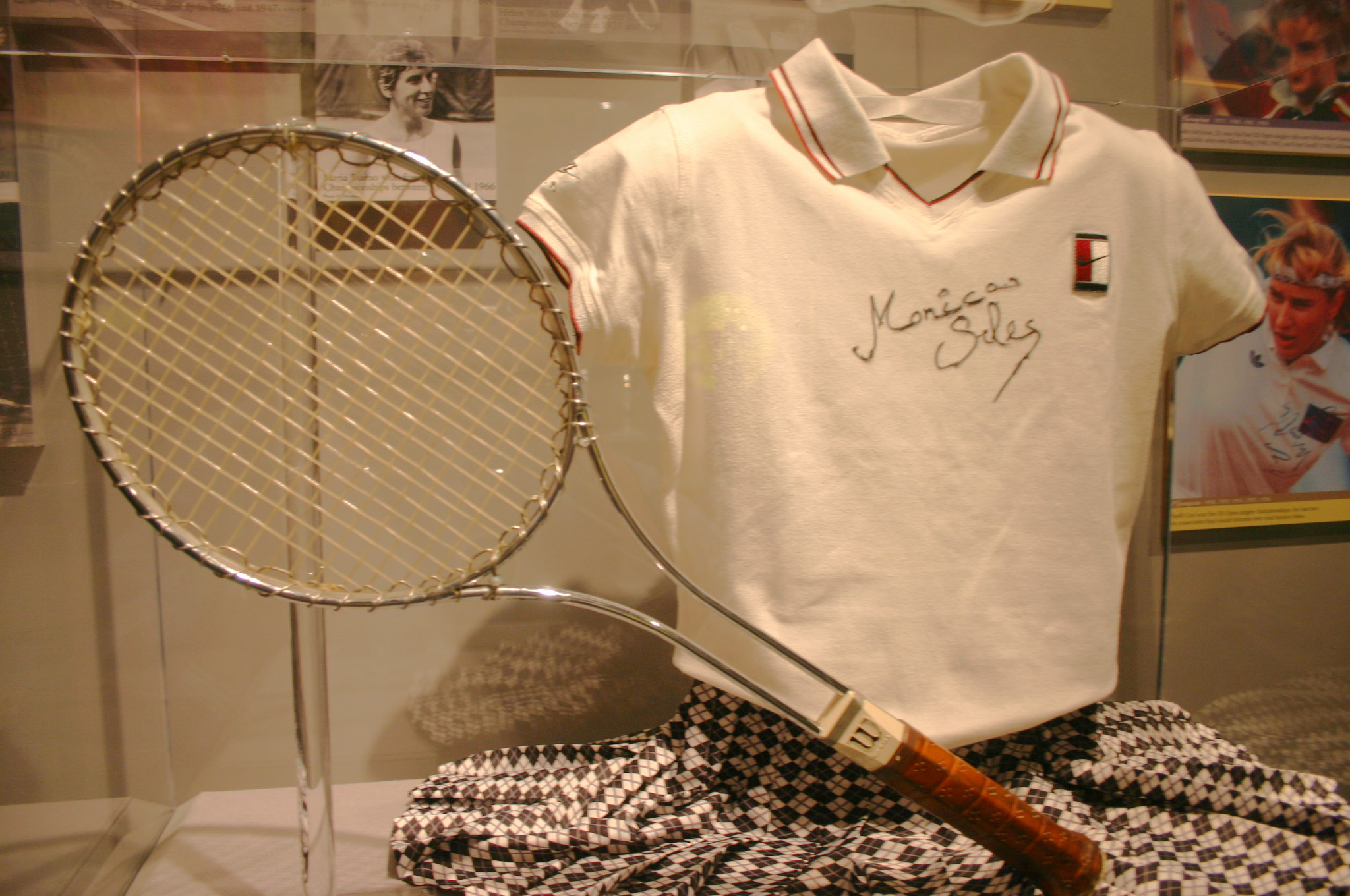
Wilson steel racquet T2000, used by Jimmy Connors

In 1964, Wilson acquired "Wonder Products Company", which made toys and custom-molded items. The company transformed the custom-mold section to make protective equipment for American football and baseball, such as face masks for football helmets and leg guards for baseball catchers.

In 1967, the company was acquired by Ling-Temco-Vought. Only three years later, PepsiCo became Wilson's new owner. In those days, the company manufactured and commercialized the official balls of both the NBA and NFL, and provided most of the uniforms of teams in Major League Baseball (MLB) and the United States Summer Olympics teams.

In 1979, Wilson tennis balls were first used in the US Open, and still are used to this day. In 2006, the Australian Open began using Wilson tennis balls. In 1985, Wilson was acquired by Westray Capital Corporation, through subsidiary WSGC Holdings. In 1989, WSGC merged with Bogey Acquisitions Company, which is affiliated with the Finnish group Amer Sports.

In May 2020, it was announced that Wilson became the NBA and WNBA's official game ball supplier, starting with the 2021 season; Wilson replaced Spalding, after the latter company's 37-year partnership with the league ended, thus returning Wilson as the game ball supplier to the NBA.

== Products ==
Wilson manufactures and commercializes a variety of products for several sports. The following chart contains all the product lines by the company.

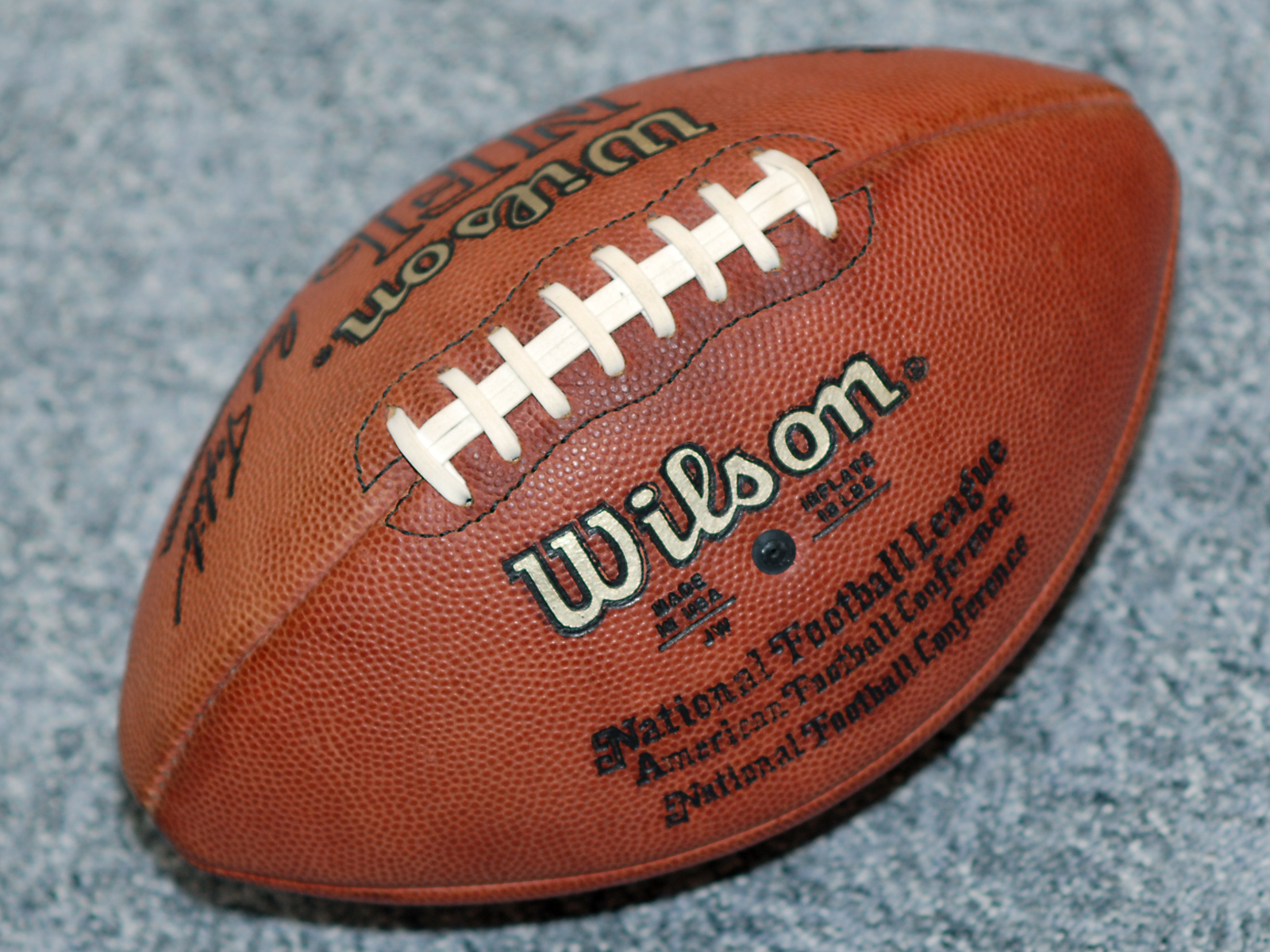
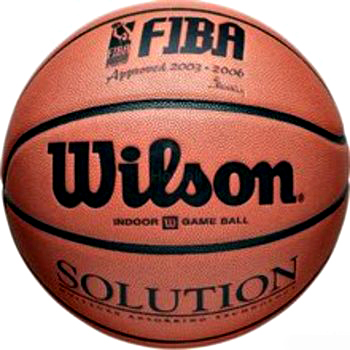
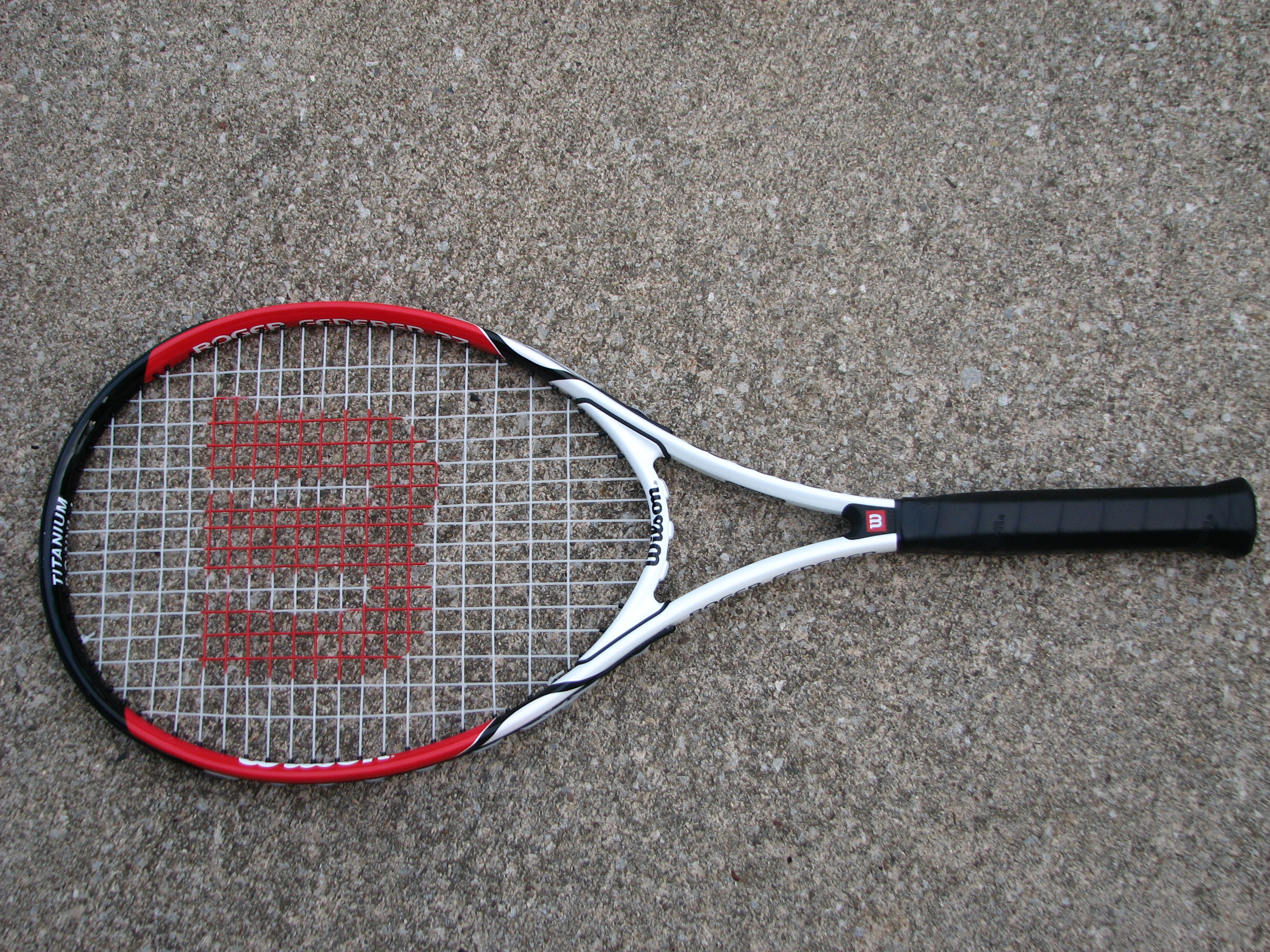
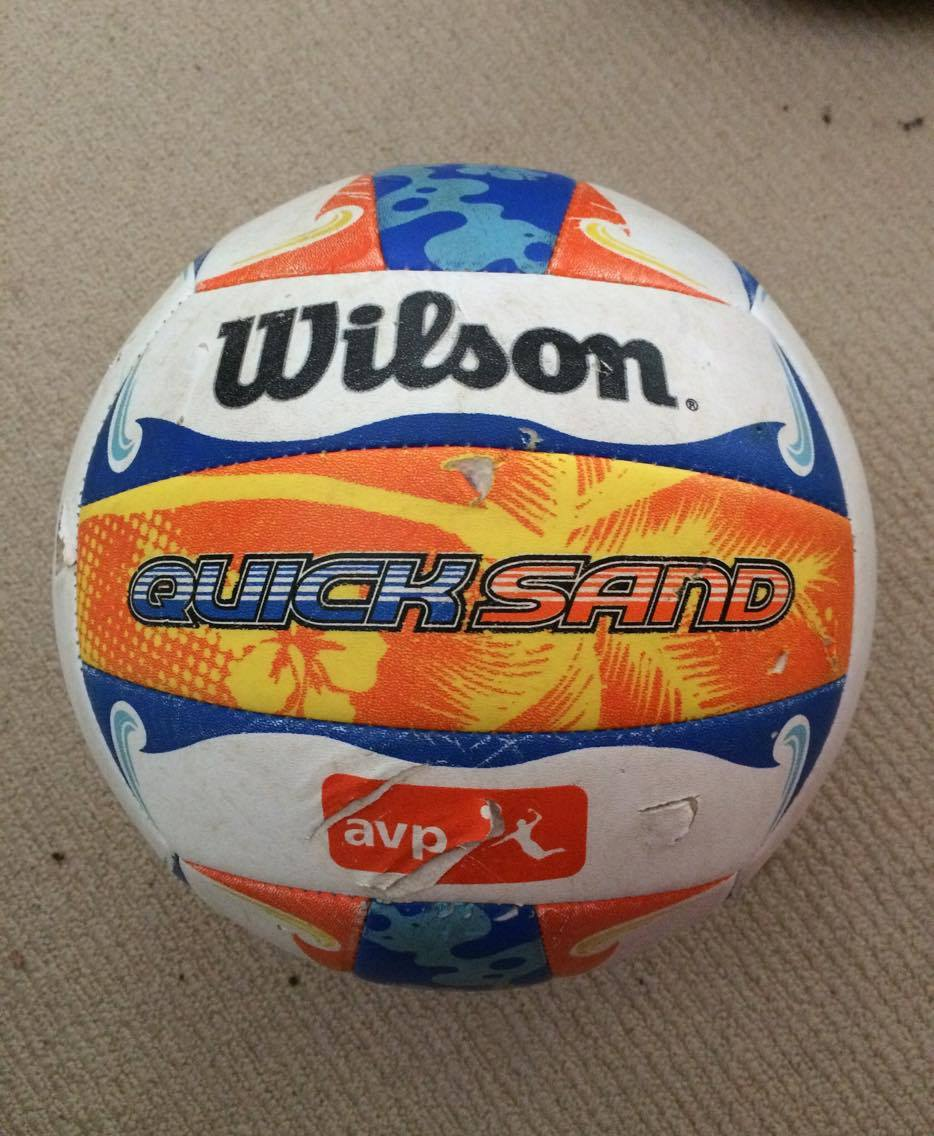
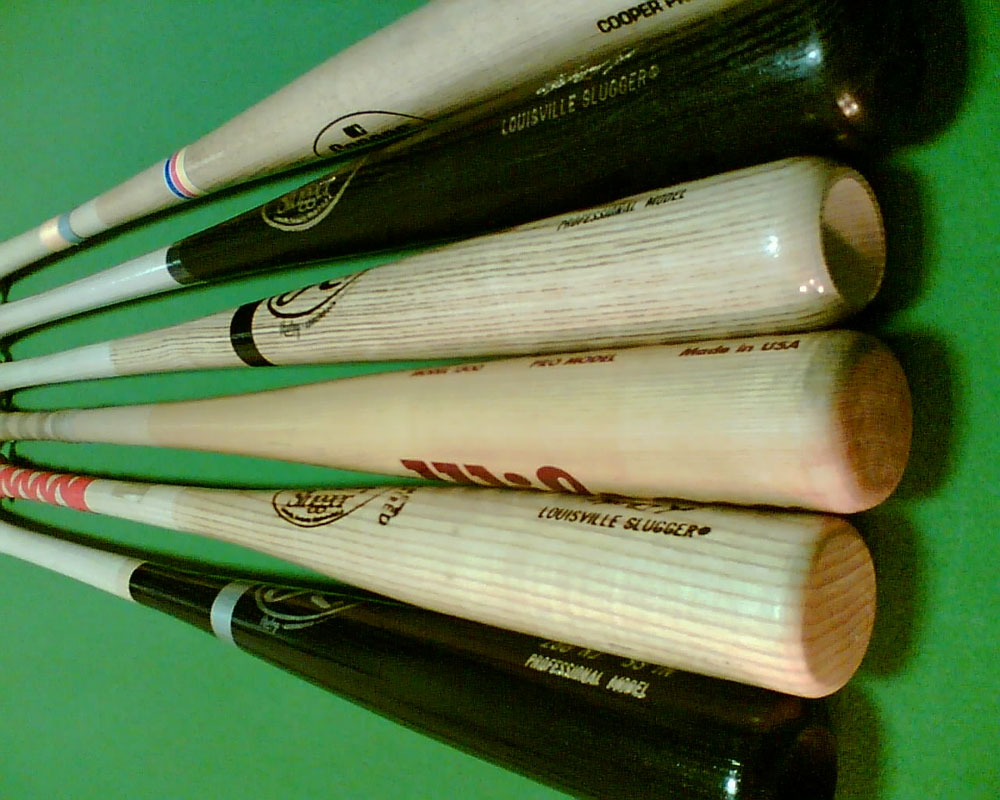
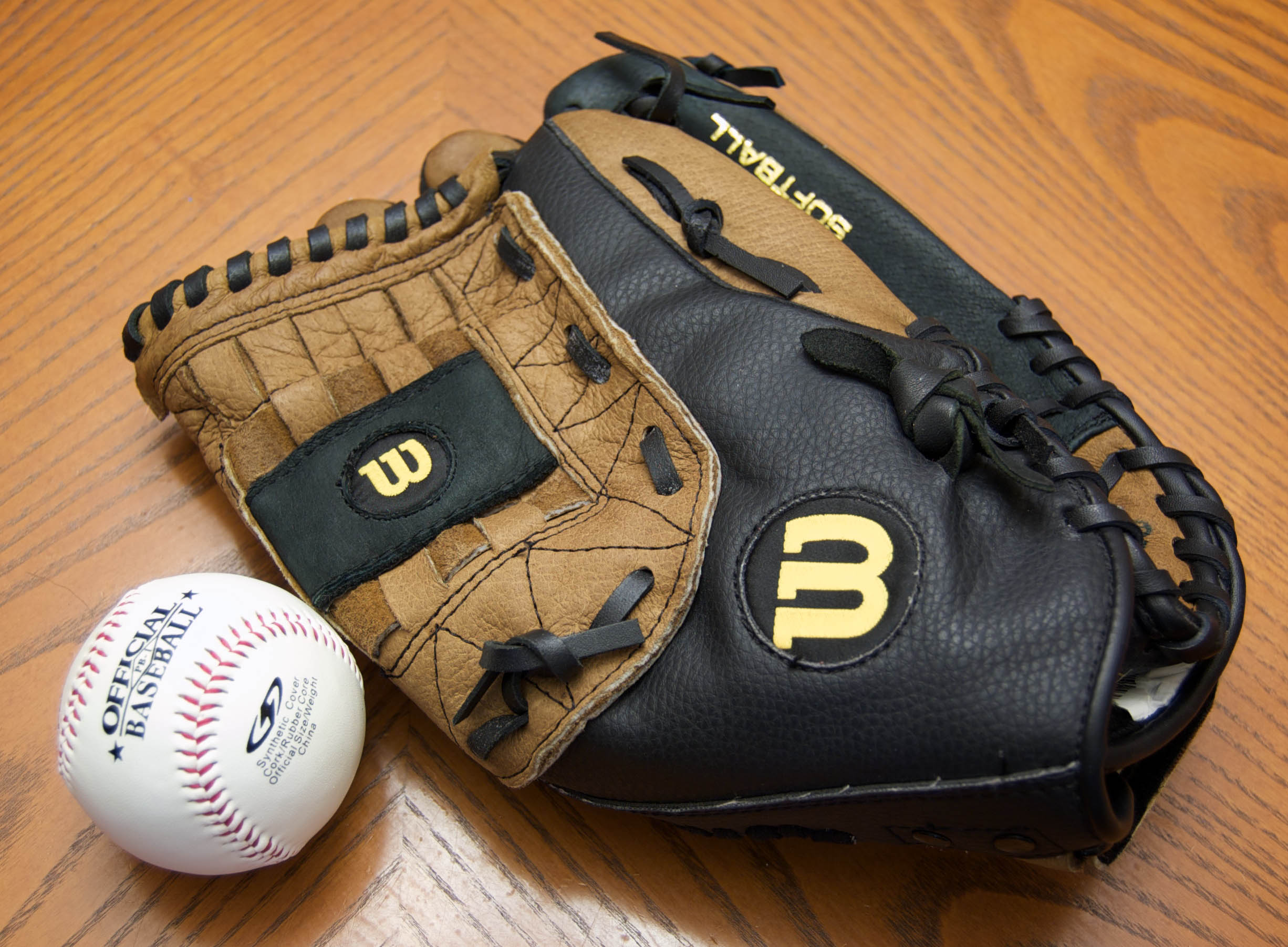
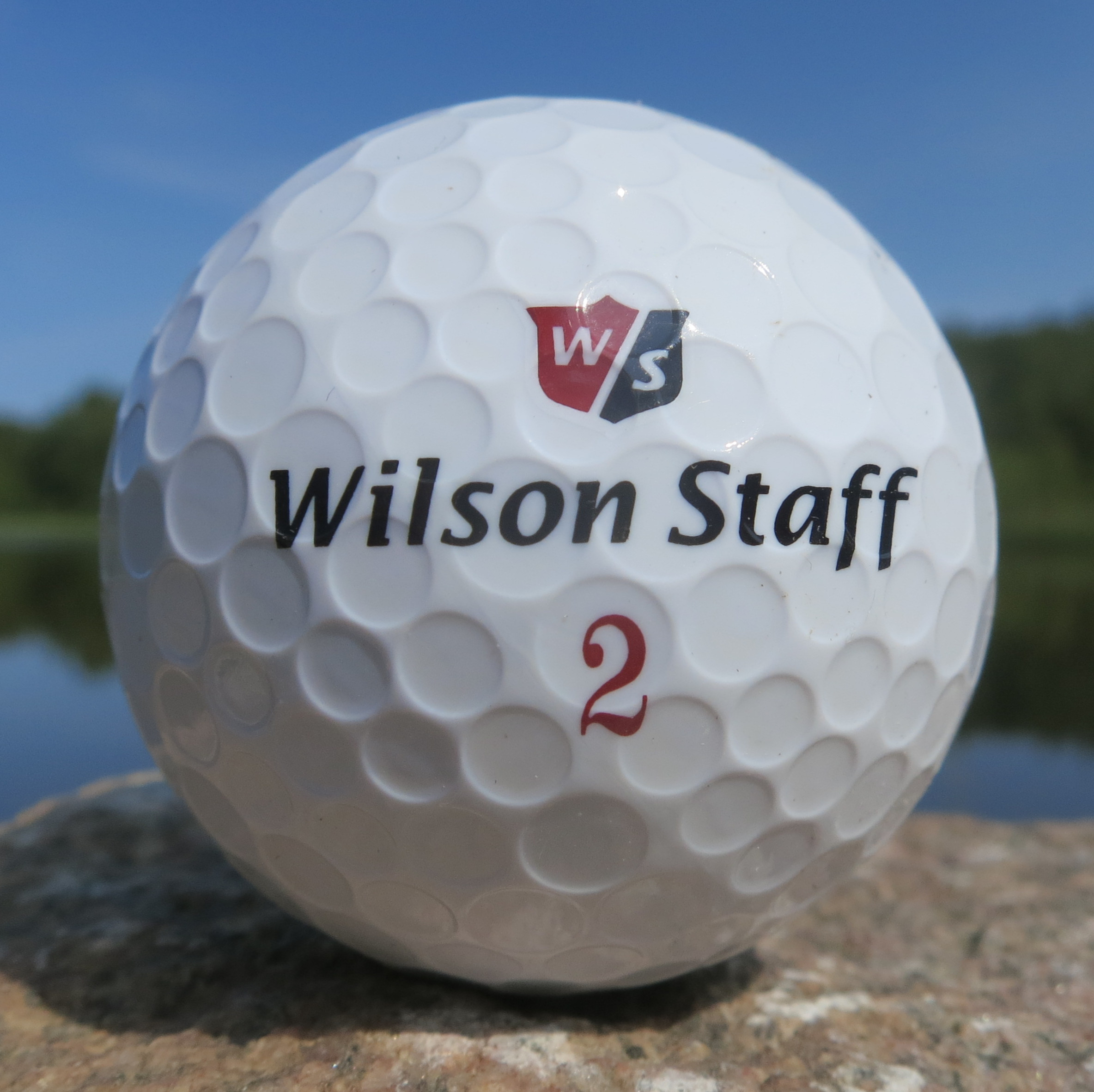
Some of the Wilson products: American football, basketball, tennis racquet, volleyball, baseball bats, baseball glove, and golf ball

Sport	Range of products
American football	Balls
Badminton	Rackets
Baseball	Balls, bats, (Note: Some manufactured and commercialized through Wilson's subsidiary brand DeMarini, some (Louisville Slugger) manufacture under contract by Hillerich & Bradsby for Wilson.) batting gloves, uniforms, protective gear (Batting helmet, shin guards, shoulder pads)
Basketball	Balls
Fastpitch softball	Balls, protective gear
Golf	Clubs, balls, bags, apparel
Paddle tennis	Paddles
Pickleball	Paddles, balls, shoes, bags
Platform tennis	Paddles
Racquetball	Rackets, balls, shoes
Soccer	Balls
Squash	Rackets
Tennis	Rackets & strings, grips, balls, shoes, apparel, bags
Volleyball	Balls
General accessories	Bags, gloves, shin guards

=== Louisville Slugger ===
The Louisville Slugger brand baseball bat has been manufactured since 1884, and has been very popular in professional baseball for many decades. The bat was endorsed by Honus Wagner in 1905 (likely the first endorsement of a product by an American professional athlete), and was used by Babe Ruth along with many other baseball stars through history.

The Louisville Slugger brand was controlled and manufactured by Hillerich & Bradsby from 1884 until 2015, when the brand was bought by Wilson. The brand complements Wilson's existing DeMarini subsidiary which also produces bats. Hillerich & Bradsby remains an independent business and continues to manufacture bats as an exclusive supplier for Wilson. The company also operates Louisville Slugger Museum and Factory, an attraction in downtown Louisville, Kentucky, which showcases the story of Louisville Slugger baseball bats in baseball and in American history.

==== P72 baseball bat ====
The P72 model Louisville Slugger bat was created in 1954 (while the brand was still under the ownership of Hillerich & Bradsby) for career minor leaguer Les Pinkham, and became one of baseball's most popular bats. Baseball Hall of Famers Cal Ripken Jr. and Robin Yount are among the players who used the P72 over the years. New York Yankee star Derek Jeter used the P72 for every at bat in his 20 MLB seasons, with over 12,500 plate appearances and 3,749 P72 models ordered.

On September 25, 2014, in honor of Jeter's impending retirement, the P72 designation was retired, and the bat was renamed the DJ2 (Jeter wore #2). Descendants of Les Pinkam will still be allowed to get the bat with its P72 designation. In addition to retiring the P72 model number, Louisville Slugger also promised to give the final 72 P72 bats produced to Jeter to raise funds for his Turn 2 Foundation.

== Sponsorships ==
=== American football ===
Wilson has been the official game ball supplier of the NFL and CFL since 1941 and 1995, respectively, and the now defunct UFL and AAF. The Duke is the official game ball of the NFL and is composed of 4 panels cut from a cowhide supplied by the Horween Leather Company. Each panel is color matched to ensure that the football has a consistent color. The ball is then stamped with decals before being sewed together. After sewing the ball is then turned by hand right side out before being laced and inspected. In addition, the GST model is used at the Highschool and College levels of play.

=== Baseball ===
Wilson makes a variety of baseball gloves for several different patterns. Wilson has three main series of baseball gloves, the A2K, the A2000, and the A1000, as well as many other models for younger children. The A2K is made from Wilson's Pro Stock Select leather, which is made from triple sorting their famous pro stock leather. A stock A2K (Pro Stock select leather) retails for US$399. The A2000, made from Wilson's Pro Stock leather, is the oldest glove series Wilson offers. The A2000 retails for US$299. The A1000 is made from Wilson's top-shelf leather and retails US$149. Some of Wilson's most famous patterns include the datdude, 1786, Dp15, 1787, 1776, 1788, 1799, 2800, M1, 1791 Pudge, and many others.

=== Basketball ===
Wilson has been the official ball supplier for many FIBA competitions, the NBA, the WNBA, the NCAA basketball championship tournaments, the CEBL, the BAL, and many others.

In May 2024, Caitlin Clark signed a multiyear contract with Wilson, the official basketball supplier for WNBA at the time. Clark was designated a brand ambassador for the company and creative director for her basketball collections scheduled to be released throughout 2024. Clark was the first athlete to create and release a signature Wilson basketball collection since Michael Jordan released his with the company in the 1980s and was the first-ever female athlete to have a signature collection with Wilson.

=== Golf ===
Wilson Staff is the golf division of Wilson Sporting Goods. The company designs and manufactures a full range of golf equipment, accessories and clothing using the Wilson Staff, ProStaff and Ultra brands.

Many of the world's top professional golfers have used Wilson equipment including Nick Faldo, Arnold Palmer and Ben Crenshaw; the latter two of whom used Wilson 8802 putters. Crenshaw's even received the moniker Little Ben due to his proficiency with it. Current Wilson Staff players include British Open and PGA Championship champion Pádraig Harrington.

=== Soccer ===
Wilson has been the official ball supplier for NCAA soccer.

=== Tennis ===
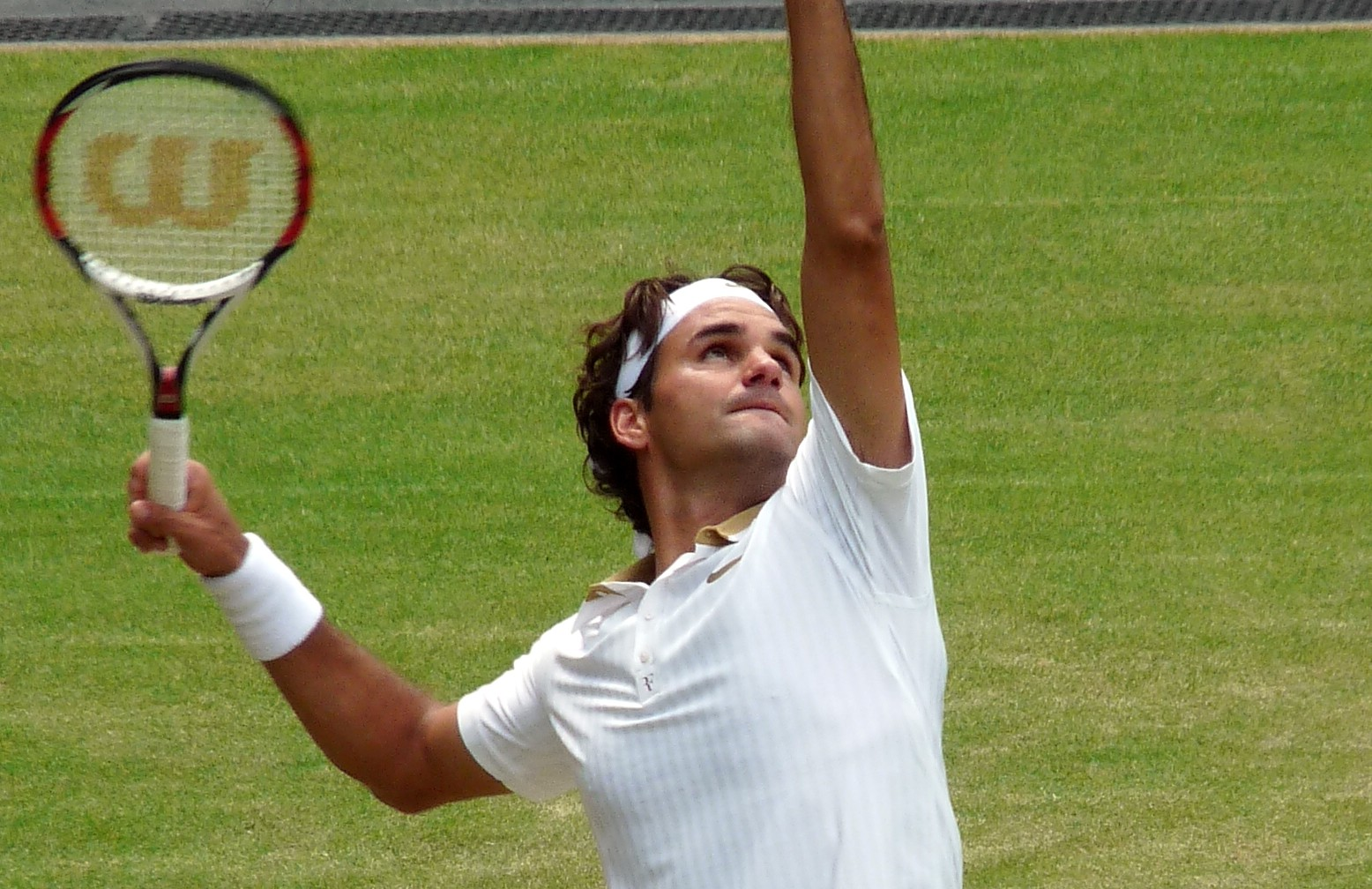
Roger Federer used Wilson racquets in the 2009 Wimbledon Championship.

Wilson is a major manufacturer of tennis rackets. The original kevlar Pro Staff model racket, known for its use by Pete Sampras, was heavy (more than 350g strung) and small-headed (85 sq. in.); Roger Federer also used the same racket model. In 2015, he used the Pro Staff RF97 Autograph model that is heavy (340 g/12 oz unstrung) and larger (97 sq. in.). Jim Courier and Stefan Edberg also used the Pro Staff Original, Edberg later switching to the Pro Staff Classic in 1991, which was the same racket (85 sq. in. with slightly rounded frame edges) but with different paint work. In late 2009, Wilson unveiled their latest line of rackets, codenamed 20x, which they would later rename BLX. This line directly replaces their previous K-Factor series with all new technologies. Also, many pros use custom-made rackets that perform differently from the mass-produced versions, as highlighted in a 2013 class-action lawsuit which addresses the complaint detailing that "Wilson Sporting Goods falsely claimed that Federer used its Six.One Tour BLX racket when he won the 2010 Stockholm Open and Wilson’s Pro Staff Six.One 90 racket when he won a Grand Slam event."

Models of Wilson's tennis balls

Wilson US Open 1 ball	Wilson 2 ball	Wilson US Open 3 ball	Wilson 100 Ball

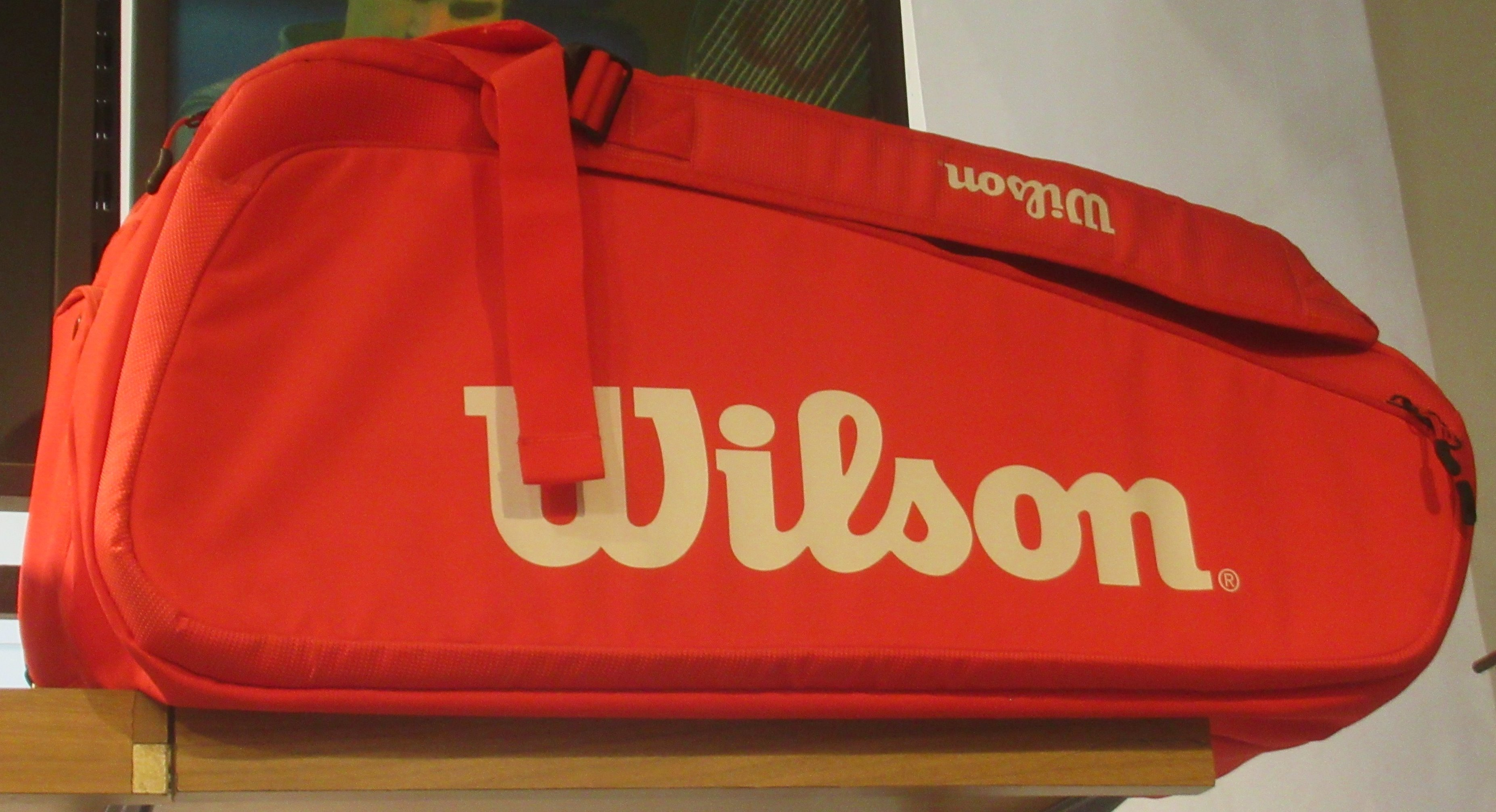
Wilson Sporting Goods orange tennis bag

Aside from tennis rackets, the Wilson sporting goods company also makes tennis balls (including the official balls of the US Open and starting in 2020, the French Open major championships), shoes, balls, strings, clothes, and racquet bags.

=== Volleyball ===
Wilson is the official ball supplier of the AVP. In 2021, Wilson developed a brand partnership with Crossnet.

== Wilson volleyballs ==
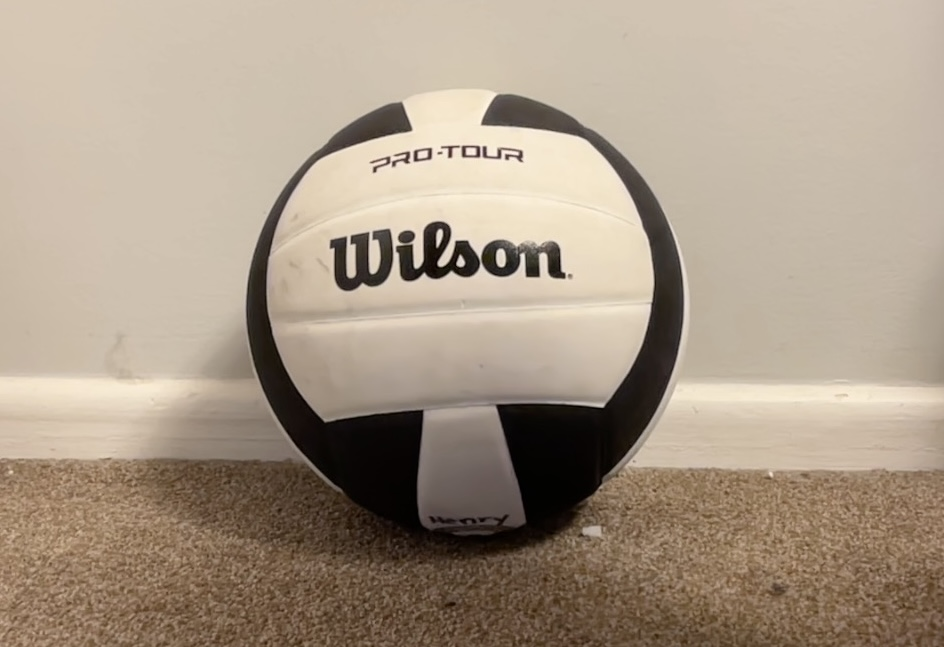

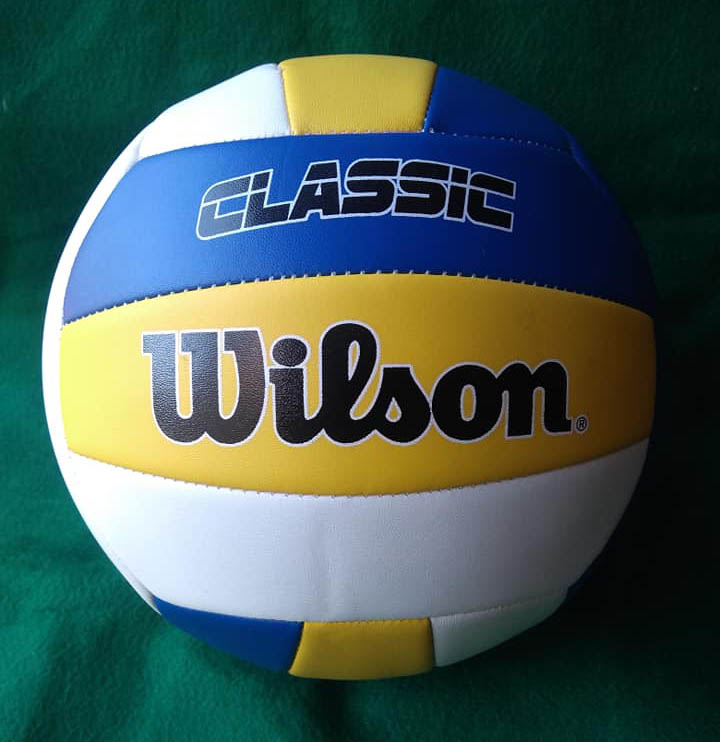

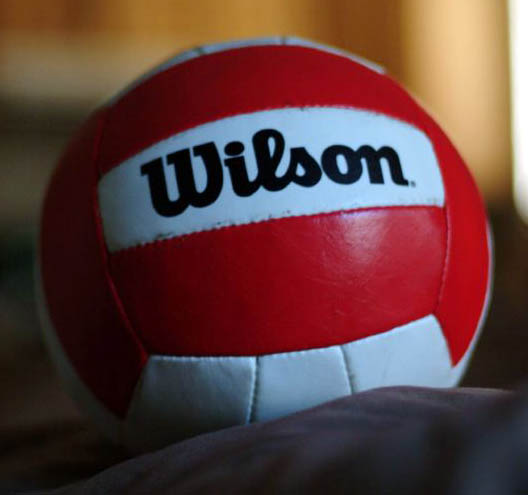

== In popular culture ==
Wilson (Cast Away)

A Wilson volleyball "co-starred" alongside Tom Hanks in the film Cast Away. Hanks' character named the ball, with a smiling face drawn from a bloody handprint, which he became deeply attached to, "Wilson". After the success of the film, Wilson Sporting Goods actually created and marketed special edition volleyballs with Wilson's "face" printed on.

== See also ==
- Ripper (racquet)
