= List of ski brands =

The following is a list of businesses known for manufacturing skis. Some of these manufacturers may also produce boots and bindings.

== Skis ==
Brand	Type	Origin	Established	Defunct
4FRNT	Alpine	United States	2002	
1000 skis	Alpine	Norway	2020	
Armada	Alpine	United States	2002	
Asnes	Nordic	Norway	1922	
Atomic	Alpine, Nordic	Austria	1955	
Black Crows	Alpine	France	2006	
Black Diamond	Alpine	United States	1989	
Blizzard	Alpine	Austria	1945	
C6	Alpine	New Zealand	2013	
Candide	Alpine	France	2023	
Coalition	Alpine	United States	2014	2026
DPS	Alpine	United States	2005	
Dynafit	Alpine	Austria	1950	
Dynastar	Alpine	France	1963	
Elan	Alpine	Slovenia	1945	
Extrem	Alpine	Sweden	1981	
Faction	Alpine	Switzerland	2006	
Ferreol	Alpine	Canada	2019	
Fischer	Alpine, Nordic	Austria	1924	
Forest	Alpine	Slovakia	2012	
Forszty	Alpine	Poland	2014	
Hagan	Alpine	Austria	1924	
Hart	Alpine	United States	1955	2022
Havu	Alpine	Finland	2019	
Head	Alpine	United States	1950	
Hexcel	Alpine	United States	1971	1984
Hinterland	Alpine	United States	2009	
K2	Alpine	United States	1962	
Karhu	Nordic	Finland	1920	
Kastle	Alpine, Nordic	Austria	1924	
Kingswood	Alpine	New Zealand	2005	
Kneissl	Alpine	Austria	1861	
La Sportiva	Touring, Nordic	Italy	1928	
Lampsisen Suksitehdas	Nordic	Finland	1901	1992
Liberty Skis	Alpine	United States	2003	
Line	Alpine	United States	1995	
Lonely Mountain	Alpine	United Kingdom	2013	
Lusti	Alpine	Czech Republic	1993	
Madshus	Nordic	Norway	1906	
Majesty	Alpine	Poland	2007	
Meier	Alpine	United States	2009	
Moment	Alpine	United States	2003	
Monck Custom	Alpine	Poland	2011	
Nordica	Alpine	Italy	1939	
Noworyta	Alpine	Poland	2024	
Ogasaka	Alpine	Japan	1912	
Olin	Alpine	United States	1960	2010
ON3P	Alpine	United States	2006	
Paradise	Alpine	Canada	2019	
Parlor	Alpine	United States	2009	
Peltonen	Nordic	Finland	1945	
Praxis	Alpine	United States	2005	
Pusu	Alpine	Finland	2009	
Renoun	Alpine	United States	2014	
RMU	Alpine	United States	2008	
Rønning Treski	Nordic	Norway	1936	
Rossignol	Alpine, Nordic	France	1907	
Salomon	Alpine, Nordic	France	1947	
Scott	Alpine	United States	1958	
SGN	Alpine	Norway	2011	
Shaggy's	Alpine	United States	2008	
Skevik	Alpine	Canada	2005	
The Ski	Alpine	United States	1974	1985?
Stereo	Alpine	Norway	2008	
Stockli	Alpine	Switzerland	1935	
Voit	Alpine	United States	1966	1969
Volant	Alpine	United States	1966	1989
Völkl	Alpine	Germany	1923	
ZAG	Alpine	France	2002	

== Boots ==
The following list consists of companies known primarily for their ski boots. Some entries are duplicated from above, but not all. Some brands, like Head, sell branded boots from other companies and are therefore not listed here.

Brand	Origins	Established	Notes
Black Diamond Equipment	United States	1989	Formerly Chouinard Equipment (founded in 1957), Black Diamond first entered the ski market in the early 1980s with the XCD telemark binding. Today, Black Diamond designs and manufacturers a full line of skis, boots and bindings for alpine, telemark and touring pursuits. Black Diamond Equipment and Scarpa began a partnership in 1987 that ended in 2005.
Hanson	United States	1969	Chris and Denny Hanson developed the rear-entry boot while working at Lange, and left to form their own company. Successful during the 1970s, mis-steps during the early 1980s led to their bankruptcy in 1984. Purchased by Daiwa and continues to exist in Japan.
K2	United States	1962	K2 launched its first boot production on Vashon Island in 1975. That effort failed. Purchased Raichle Flexon molds and started Full Tilt around 2006; launched a boot line under the K2 label in 2013. Sold to Jarden Corp. and then to Newell Rubbermaid. Sold to private equity company Kohlberg.
La Sportiva	Italy	1928	Founded by Narciso Delladio, La Sportiva has been producing footwear for mountain sports since 1928, specialising in mountain running, rock climbing, ice climbing, alpine climbing, and skiing.
Lange	United States	1962	Introduced the first plastic ski boots in 1962, and followed up with a greatly improved model in 1965/66. After 1968, they were a must-have for racers, and rapidly took over the market. Remain a major player to this day, especially in racing.
Nordica	Italy	1939	Nordica was formed in Montebelluna, the center of Italian ski boot manufacturing to this day. Entered the plastic ski boot market in 1968, following the lead set by Lange. Nordica pioneered use of the removable, customizable innerboot. Also produces skis and other equipment today. Part of the Tecnica Group.
Rosemount	United States	1965	Another contender for title of "first plastic boot", Rosemount was an all-fibreglass shell with a unique side-opening design. Was in the process of introducing a rear-entry model in 1973 when they were purchased by G.H. Bass, then the United States distributor for Raichle. Rosemount ceased production around 1975.
Salomon	France	1947	Introduced the famed SX series of rear-entry boots in 1979, and was a major success through the 1980s. When the rear-entry design rapidly fell from favour around 1990, they purchased the San Giorgio factory and turned to traditional front-entry designs. Salomon remains a major boot producer today.
Scarpa	Italy	1938	Founded in Asolo, near Treviso by Rupert Guinness, 2nd Earl of Iveagh, SCARPA (Società Calzaturieri Asolani Riuniti Pedemontana Anonima) has been producing mountaineering and ski boots since 1938.
Tecnica	Italy	1960	Formed in Montebelluna in 1960 to produce leather work boots, the company introduced the Moon Boot for apres-ski. They followed this with their first ski boots in 1973. Now control a large number of brands including Nordica, Rollerblade, Dolomite, Lowa, Think Pink, Blizzard, Moon Boot, and others.
