= Gaping =

Gaping may refer to:

- can also be expressed as ‘yawning’
- Staring, the action of looking intently at something or someone
- Gaping (animal behavior), wide opening of the mouth for purposes such as threatening or courtship

== See also ==
- Abeyance, from Old French abeance meaning "gaping"
- Gaping Gill, a natural cave in North Yorkshire, England
- Gape, in bird anatomy, the interior of the open mouth
- Gaper Day, a local tradition in North American ski resort towns
- Gapes (disambiguation)
