= Abma =

Abma or ABMA may refer to:

== Organizations ==
- All Burma Monks' Alliance
- American Bearing Manufacturers Association
- Army Ballistic Missile Agency

== People with the surname ==
- Hette Abma (1917-1992), Dutch politician
- Harmen Abma (1937-2007), Frisian abstract artist
- Karin Abma (born 1951), Dutch rower
- Mark Abma, Canadian freeskier

== Other uses ==
- Abma language, a language of Vanuatu
