= Freeskiing =

Type of alpine skiing

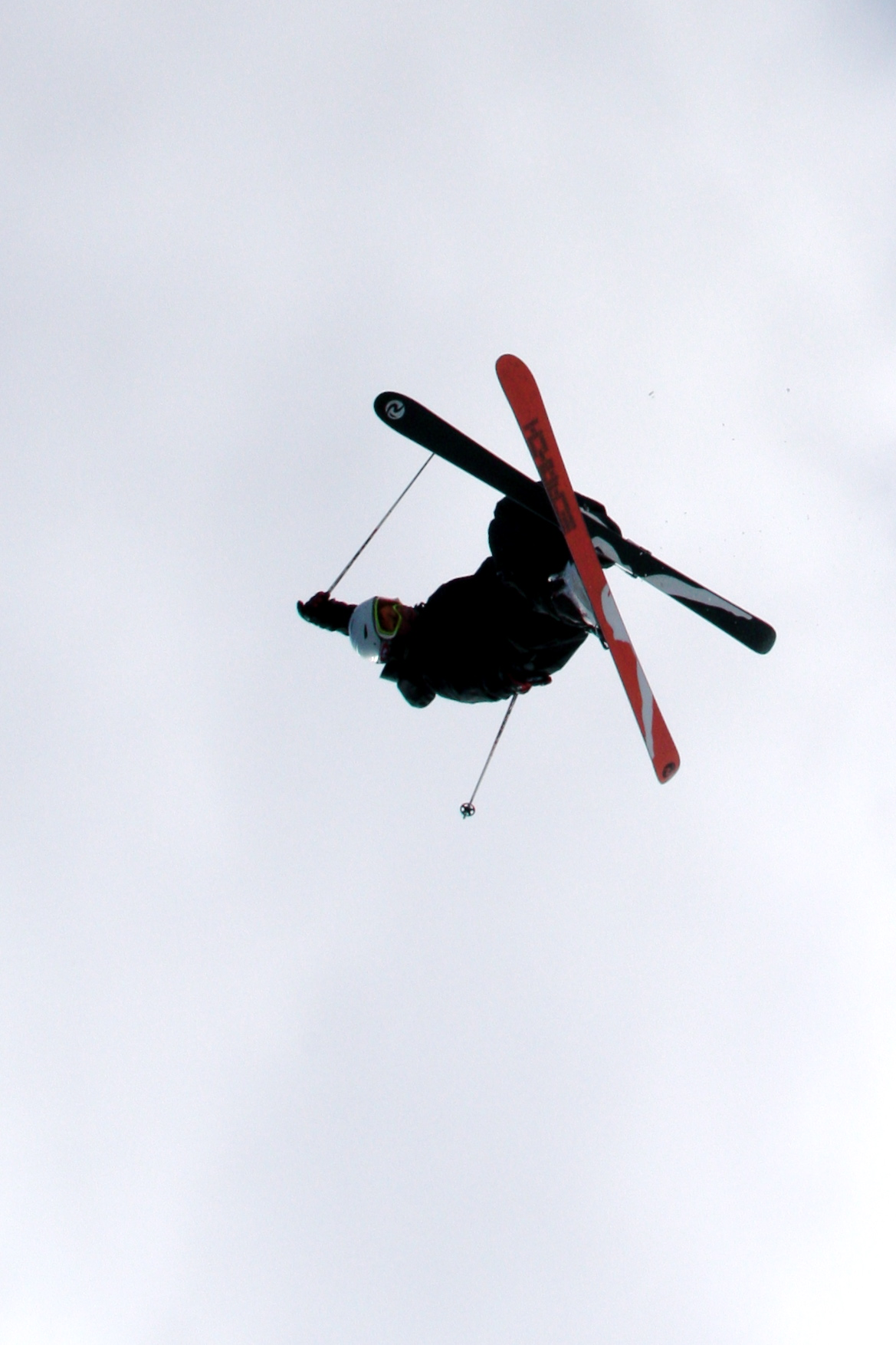
Skier performing a mute grab

Pictograms of Olympic sports - Freestyle skiing

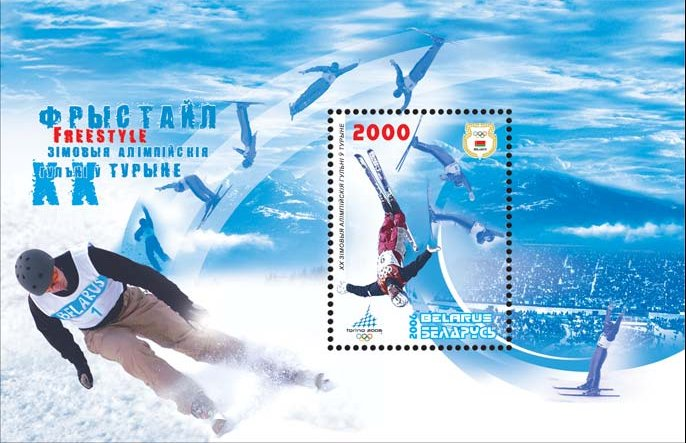
Belarus postal stamp souvenir sheet commemorating the 2006 Winter Olympics featuring freestyle skiing.

Freeskiing, or new school skiing, is a specific type of alpine skiing, which involves tricks, jumps, and terrain park features, such as rails, boxes, jibs, or other obstacles. This form of skiing resulted from the growth of snowboarding combined with the progression of freestyle skiing. "Newschoolers", or those who specifically ski in this style, as opposed to traditional freestylers, freeriders, big mountain skiers, and racers, are often found in terrain parks, which are designed specifically for tricks.

Controversially, freestyle skiing is viewed as its own sport, but some view it as a subset of freeskiing. Some participants view it as a separate sport and do not refer to it as freestyle. The sport does not require participants to compete, but there are competitive events available at every level of the sport. Currently there are two Olympic freeskiing events, half-pipe skiing and slopestyle. These events make up two of the four Olympic freestyle skiing events.

The sport has seen continual growth since its inception in the late 1990s. There is currently a growing number of professional freeskiers, most of whom compete, specializing in a certain freeskiing discipline, while a few do not compete, but rather produce and star in videos.

== Newschool terrain ==
=== Backcountry ===
Any skiing outside the prepared or marked trails is referred to as backcountry or off-piste skiing. This form of skiing is probably the most mortally dangerous (depending on where and how it is done) because of the high speeds, large drops (sometimes with hidden rocks in the landing), and avalanches. This type of skiing has been banned in certain areas of the world because of chances of injury or death. Many see this form of skiing to be the most freeing, because it creates a relationship of just the skier and mountain. Backcountry skiers consist of both newschool skiers who perform tricks off various terrain features, and oldschoolers as well.

=== Park ===
Park is skiing on man-made features provided by the ski area such as jumps, rails, boxes, and halfpipes. According to Freeskier's 2010 Travel Guide the top resorts in North America for park are Breckenridge, Mammoth, Aspen/Snowmass, Park City, Poley Mountain, Whistler Blackcomb, Alivia, and Mount Snow.

=== Street or urban skiing ===
Street or urban skiing consists of sliding or grinding skis on rails, walls, ledges, or other features found in urban areas. Some professional freestyle or newschool skiers, such as Clayton Vila and Will Wesson, specialize in skiing on urban features, while being filmed, producing segments for skiing film companies such as Level 1 productions, Stept Productions, or 4bi9 media. In 2016, the X Games created a video competition called "X Games Real Ski" where a group of professional skiers selected by the X Games have the opportunity to film and submit an urban segment. Winners are selected by a panel of judges, and the public is also given an opportunity to vote for the fan favorite.

== Industry ==
=== "Core" Ski Manufacturers ===
There are many relatively small companies that have supported and greatly added to the progression of Newschool Skiing. These companies make skis specific for Newschool Skiing. Line is believed to be the first newschool skiing company.

== Equipment ==
Freeskiing requires at least three pieces of gear. Skis, Ski boots and ski bindings. In addition to this, many skiers choose to use poles, goggles, ski clothing and safety gear such as helmets and avalanche gear. Almost everything used by freeskiers is designed specifically for use in freeskiing rather than ordinary skiing.

=== Types of skis ===
There are three kinds of newschool skis: powder, all-mountain and park (twin tip).

==== Powder ====
Powder skis, also called big-mountain or backcountry skis, have a wide waist width, making them ideal for places with heavy powder. The extra surface area helps skiers to float above premium powder. However, they can be difficult to use on slopes with less snow or groomed trails, especially for beginning to moderate skiers. Experienced skiers sometimes buy powder skis as an alternate pair, to be used when conditions warrant it. True backcountry skis have a waist width of 90 to 110 millimeters, while powder skis are the widest type, measuring from 110 to 140 millimeters.

==== All-mountain ====
Most Alpine skis fall into this category. All-mountain skis are designed to perform in all types of snow conditions and at most speeds. Narrower all-mountain skis are better for groomed runs, while wider styles handle better in powder and poor conditions. Other names for this style of ski include mid-fat skis, all-purpose skis, and the one-ski quiver.

==== Park ====
Park skis are often designed with a more symmetrical shape to make switch (backwards) skiing much easier and reinforced edges to withstand rails. Eric Pollard designed the first two symmetrical skis, the Anthem and the Invader. Pollard now has his own pro model skis from Line skis called the EP Pro (Mr. Pollard's Opus - 2012), the Elizabeth and the Sir Francis Bacon. Some new powder and all-mountain skis are created with 'reverse camber' (aka 'rocker') meaning that the tips and tails are bent up slightly to make powder landings easier.

== Terminology ==
=== Rail Tricks ===
- Spin on

When a skier spins around before landing on a rail, generally done in increments of 180 degrees starting at 270 (e.g. 270,450 630). When performed, spin on tricks are called in the following fashion: spin amount (can be full name or abbreviated) + on. For example, 450-on, and 4-on are both proper ways to call a trick.

- Spin out

When a skier spins at the end of a rail, generally done increments of 180 degrees starting at 270 (e.g. 270, 450, 630). When performed, spin out tricks are called in the following fashion: spin amount (can be full name or abbreviated) + out. For example, 450-out, and 4-out are both proper ways to call a trick.

- Switch-up

While sliding a rail the skier jumps and turns 180 degrees so they end up sliding the rail in the opposite direction. Also called 'swap'. Swaps can be done 'frontside' or 'backside/blindside'. As well, skiers can switch-up more than 180 degrees; for example, a '360-switch-up'/'3-swap' involves the skier jumping on a rail feature, spinning 360 degrees, and landing again on the rail.

- K-Fed

A front switch-up blind 270 out. Higher increments of spin are called "Super-Fed", "Super-Duper-Fed", "Future-Fed" and "Super-Future Fed" for spins of 450, 630, 810, and 990 out, respectively. The term "K-Fed" was invented by the members of 4bi9 media, more specifically Tyler Barnes.

- Blind swap two out

A blind switch-up front 270 out. This trick is sometimes referred to as a Britney.

- Disaster

Gap over one kink on a kinked rail.

- 50/50

Both skis on the rail feature, parallel to the feature.

- Ski Slide

One ski is on the rail feature, while the other is off

- Hippy Killer, Bindsoul, Jack Knife, Dick Squeeze, etc...

All are "rail wizardry" tricks popularized by Andy Parry. The Hippy Killer, the most well-known of these, involves bringing your trailing ski up and over the side of a box, using your ski to latch on the underside of the box, and then using this to perform a switch up.

=== Jump Tricks ===
- Spin

The most basic of jump tricks; a skier spins upright while airborne in increments of 180 degrees. Often abbreviated as just the first number for spins below 1000 degrees and the first two numbers for spins above 1000 degrees (e.g. two full spins, or 720 degrees of rotation is abbreviated to '7' while a 1080 is abbreviated to '10').

- Backflip

A backwards flip.

- Rodeo

An off-axis flip thrown backwards with a spin (most commonly 540 - 'Rodeo 5').

- Misty

An off-axis flip thrown forwards with a spin (most commonly 540 - 'Misty 5').

- Side flip Loop

A flip thrown directly towards the shoulder. It is essentially a cartwheel in the air.

- Lincoln Loop

A tilted backflip done more like a backflip in direction but as side flip with the body

- Flat Spin

An off-axis flip that is thrown over the shoulder. It is in-between a backflip and a lincoln loop.

- Cork

Backwards thrown off-axis spin, at no point should the feet be over the head.

A short video of Cork

- D-Spin

Backwards thrown off-axis spin, similar to a cork except the feet will be more at-level with head, or even slightly above.

- Bio

Forwards thrown off-axis spin, at no point should the feet be over the head.

=== Slang ===
- Steeze

Used to say something such as a skiers style, or a particular trick, was visually appealing or 'steezy'. 'Steeze' is a portmanteau of 'style' and 'ease'. Example: 'Man, that flip you did was steezy'; or, 'you have killer steeze'.

- Spin-to-Win

A common complaint in the ski community when a competition is won by performing more difficult tricks - or those with greater amounts of rotation, with less emphasis on style or perfection.

- Sandbag

The act of participating in an event where one's skill far exceeds that of the intended group. A professional competing in an amateur competition would be said to be 'sandbagging' the competition.

- Yard Sale

A term to describe someone's wipe out, referring to how their items are scattered. Typically yelled at those below while riding the ski lift.

- Solid Seven

A derogatory term used to say something was visually appealing.

- Gaper

Derogatory term for an inexperienced skier. A stereotypical "gaper gap" is one between the skier's goggles and helmet or hat. See also punter, jerry.

- Punter

Derogatory term for an inexperienced skier, especially a day tripper.

- Jerry

Derogatory term for an inexperienced skier with little knowledge of ski etiquette or culture, or a skier who has expensive equipment or a look modeled after a pro, yet little skill.

- Cool Story Hansel

A largely antiquated term used by newschoolers to inform another skier that they don't really care what they have to say.

- Stomped

An effortless looking and balanced landing.

- Train

Two or more skiers hitting a single jump at or near the same time so that at least two people are airborne at the same time.

- Hucked

Someone doing a trick on a smaller jump than is usual for the trick ("He hucked a 1080 on that tiny jump") OR someone attempting a trick with a large amount of uncertainty success ('She had never tried a rodeo before; but, she just hucked it').

- Future Spin

A spin trick where the skier spins so much that the number of degrees spun exceeds the numerical value of the current year. To successfully land a future spin at this day and age, a skier would have to spin 2025 degrees or more (closest rotation would be 2160 degrees, that is, six full revolutions).

- Afterbang

Landing an outrageous trick and acting as if it took little effort; 'leaned back and relaxed'.

== Notable freeskiers ==
- Dag Aabye
- Mark Abma
- JP Auclair
- Ingrid Backstrom
- Alex Beaulieu-Marchand
- Alex Bellemare
- Noah Bowman
- Bill Briggs
- Bobby Brown
- Sarah Burke
- Sammy Carlson
- Guerlain Chicherit
- Doug Coombs
- Chris Davenport
- Justin Dorey
- Simon Dumont
- Nick Goepper
- Alex Hall
- Tanner Hall
- Janette Hargin
- Henrik Harlaut
- Russ Henshaw
- Eric Hjorleifson
- C. R. Johnson
- Kristi Leskinen
- Shane McConkey
- Seth Morrison
- Jonny Moseley
- Jon Olsson
- Sean Pettit
- Glen Plake
- Eric Pollard
- Mike Riddle
- Kevin Rolland
- Sylvain Saudan
- TJ Schiller
- Scot Schmidt
- Candide Thovex
- Jesper Tjäder
- Kaya Turski
- Tom Wallisch
- Jossi Wells
- James Woods
- Torin Yater-Wallace

== See also ==
- Aerial skiing
- Alpine skiing
- Backcountry skiing
- Extreme skiing
- FIS Freestyle World Ski Championships
- FIS Freestyle Skiing World Cup
- Freeriding
- Freestyle skiing
- Freestyle skiing at the Winter Olympics
- Half-pipe
- List of Olympic venues in freestyle skiing
- List of skiing topics
- Mogul skiing
- Ski ballet
- Ski cross
- Slopestyle
- X Games
- IF3 International Freeski Film Festival
