= Sean Pettit =

Canadian freestyle skier

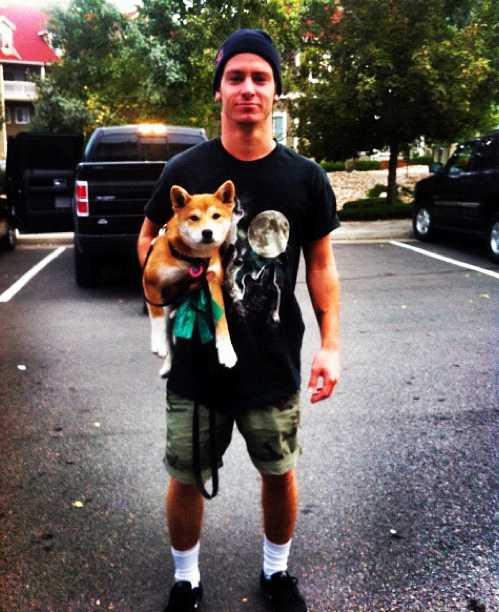

Personal information
- Full name: Sean Martin Pettit
- Born: July 27, 1992 (age 33) Ottawa, Ontario, Canada
- Height: 5 ft 8 in (1.73 m)
- Weight: 145 lb (66 kg)
- Website: seanpettit.com

Sport
- Country: Canada
- Sport: Freeskiing, Big Mountain

Sean Martin Pettit (born July 27, 1992) is a Canadian freeskier born in Ottawa, Ontario. He grew up in Chelsea, Quebec until the age of 7. He now resides in Pemberton, British Columbia.

== Skiing career ==
Pettit is a big mountain skier who has appeared in many popular ski movies. He is managed by Superheroes Management Pettit was signed by Red Bull at the age of 13 becoming their youngest athlete ever. In 2008 he appeared on the Today program, along with the late Shane McConkey.

== Sponsors ==
- K2
- Oakley
- Dakine
- Airhole

== Filmography ==
Pettit has filmed prominent segments for ski movie pioneers Matchstick Productions.

- Superheroes of Stoke - 2012
- Attack of La Niña - 2011
- The Way I See It - 2010
- In Deep - 2009
- Claim - 2008

Other film appearances:

- The Masquerade - 2015
- Tracing Skylines - 2013
- WE: A Collection of Individuals - 2012
- The Ordinary Skier - 2011
- The Massive - 2009
- K2 Skeeze 2009 - 2009
- Show & Prove - 2008
- Believe - 2007
- Pop Yer Bottlez - 2005

== Competition Results ==
- 2nd - 2013 Winter X Games - Real Ski Backcountry
- 10th - 2012 Red Bull - Cold Rush, Silverton, Colorado
- 1st - 2011 Red Bull - Cold Rush, Silverton, Colorado
- 1st - 2011 Red Bull - Line Catcher, Vars-La Foret, France
- 1st - 2010 Red Bull - Cold Rush, Nelson, BC
- 2nd - 2010 Red Bull - Line Catcher, Vars-La Foret, France
- 2nd - 2008 Red Bull - Cold Rush, Rossland, BC

== Industry awards ==
- 2015 IF3 Awards - “Best Male Freeride Segment"
- 2014 Powder Video Awards - “Best Man Made Air"
- 2013 Powder Video Awards - “Best Natural Air"
- 2012 Powder Video Awards - “Best Male Performance”
- 2011 IF3 Europe Awards - “Best Male Performance”
- 2011 Powder Video Awards - “Best Powder”
- 2010 Powder Video Awards - “Best Male Performance”
- 2010 Powder Video Awards - “Full Throttle”
- 2009 Powder Video Awards - “Breakthrough Performer”
