= Stian Hagen =

Norwegian alpine skier

Stian Hagen is a Norwegian-born professional skier for the German ski manufacturer Völkl, and has contributed to the design of several Völkl ski models, the most recent being the Kuro, which is a powder fatski with a rocker design. He is best known for his graceful big mountain lines and fluid turns. He is often featured in films by Matchstick Productions. His latest feature with MSP, was in their 2008 release "Claim", which shows Hagen and Chris Davenport climb and ski the Matterhorn in Switzerland.
