= Eric Hjorleifson =

Canadian freestyle skier

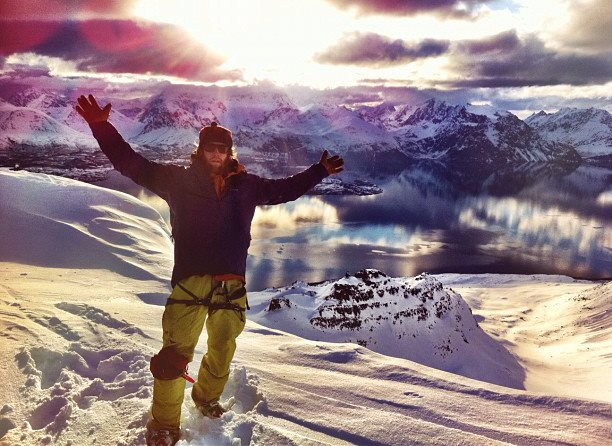

Personal information
- Full name: Eric Hjorleifson
- Born: March 14, 1983 (age 43) Canmore, Alberta
- Height: 5 ft 8 in (1.73 m)
- Weight: 150 lb (68 kg)

Sport
- Country: Canada
- Sport: Freeskiing, Big Mountain

Eric Hjorleifson (born 14 March 1983) is a professional freeskier. He was born and raised in Canmore, Alberta. Hjorleifson contributes yearly to ski movies made by the film company Matchstick Productions. Eric creates the design and graphics for a line of skis for 4FRNT.

== Childhood ==
Hjorleifson grew up in Canmore, Alberta. His father was a gymnastics coach and a stonemason. He learned to ski before he was two years old. His biggest mentor was his father, but also local race coaches Richard Jagger and Guy Mowbray.

== Sponsors ==
- 4FRNT Skis
- Smith Optics
- Arc'teryx
- Dynafit
- Gordini
- Discrete Headwear
- Fresh Sports
- Surefoot (footbeds)
- Dissent Labs (compression socks)
- Exped

== Filmography ==
- Superheroes of Stoke - 2012
- Attack of La Niña - 2011
- All I Can - 2011
- The Way I See It - 2010
- In Deep - 2009
- Claim - 2008
- Seven Sunny Days - 2007
- Push - 2006
- Pull - 2006
- The Hit List - 2005
- Yearbook - 2004

== Industry awards ==
- 2013 Powder Video Awards - "Best Line"
