= ICER =

ICER may refer to:

- ICER (file format), a wavelet-based image compression file format used by the NASA Mars Rovers
- Icer, a character in the Masters of the Universe franchise
- Institute for Clinical and Economic Review, a Boston-based nonprofit organization seeking to improve healthcare
- Incremental cost-effectiveness ratio
- International Computing Education Research, an annual research workshop sponsored by SIGCSE

== See also ==
- Icer Air, stylized as ICER AIR, an urban big-air ski and snowboard event held in San Francisco from 2005 through 2008
