= List of Winter Olympics venues: S =

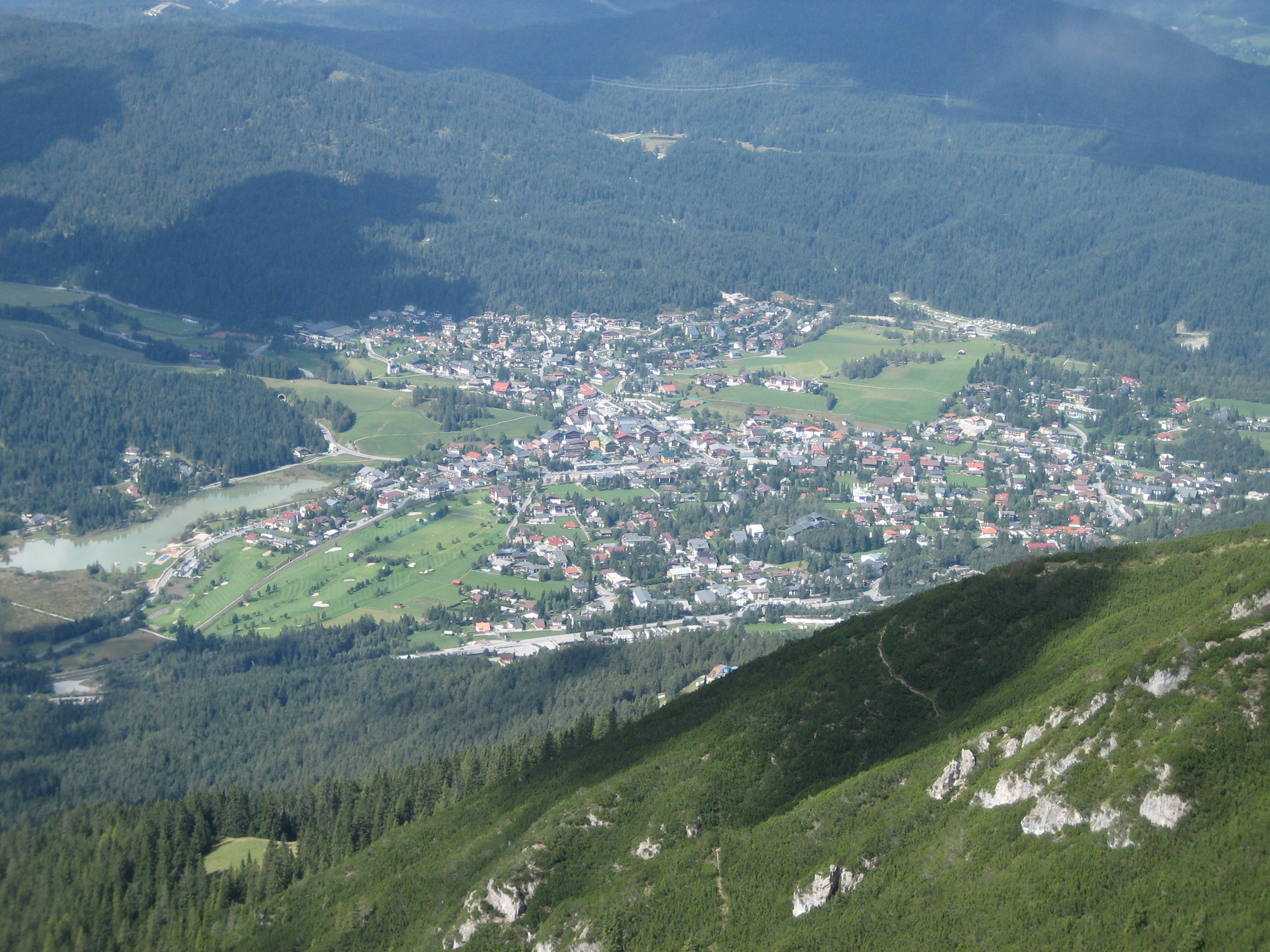
Seefeld hosted the biathlon, cross country skiing, Nordic combined, and the ski jumping normal hill events for both the 1964 and 1976 Winter Olympics in neighboring Innsbruck.

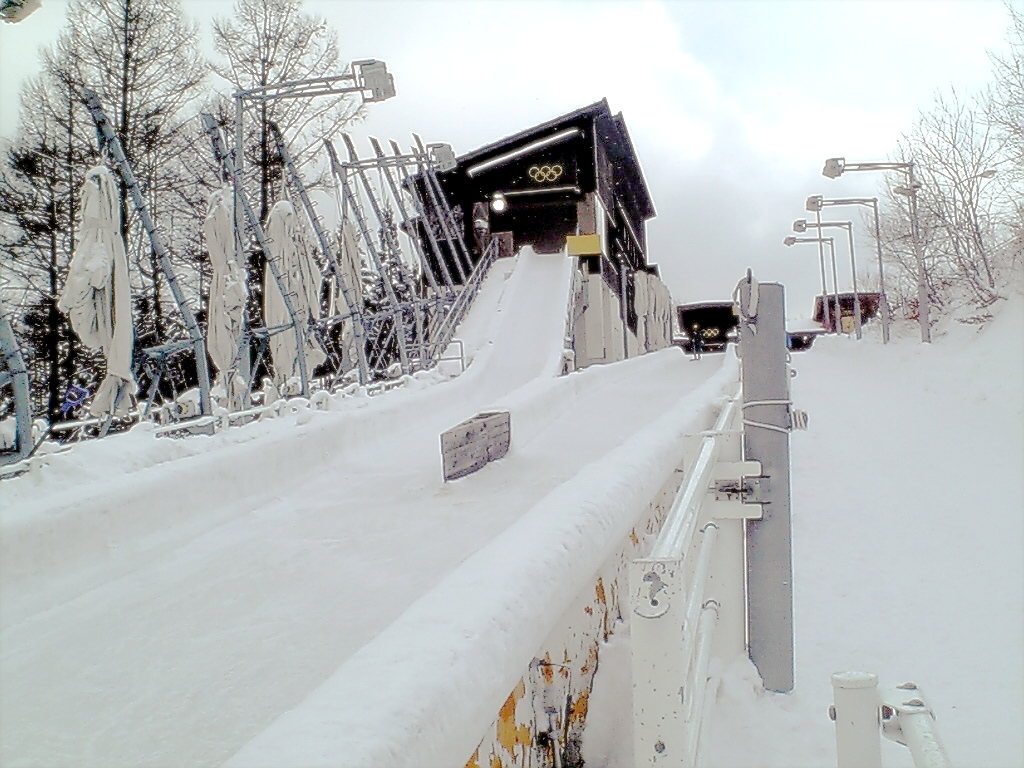
Spiral in 2007. For the 1998 Winter Olympics in Nagano, this venue hosted the bobsleigh and luge events.

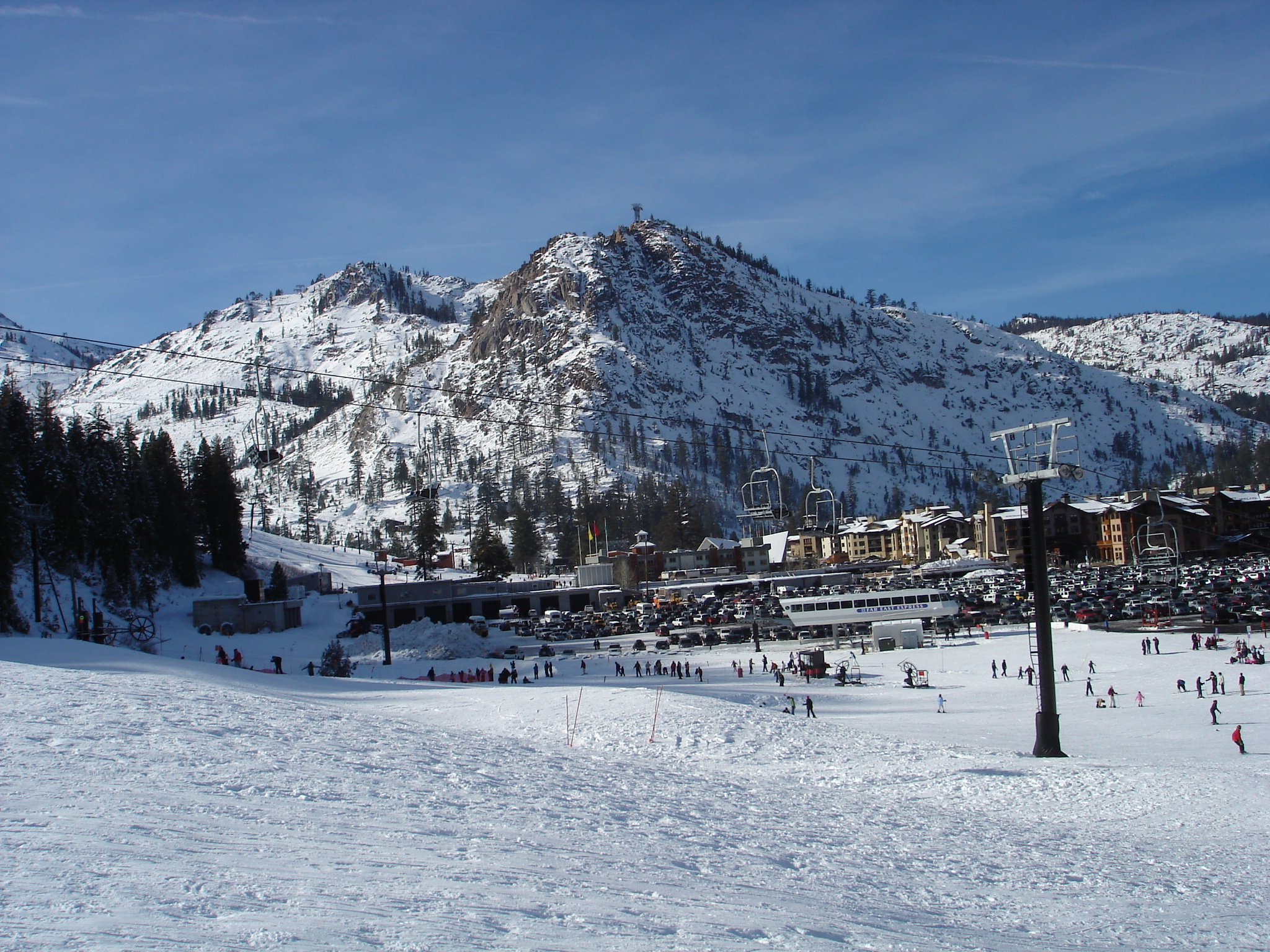
Squaw Valley Ski Resort host the alpine skiing competitions for the 1960 Winter Olympics.

For the Winter Olympics, there are 24 venues starting with the letter 'S'.

Venue	Games	Sports	Capacity	Ref.
St. Moritz Olympic Ice Rink	1928 St. Moritz	Figure skating, Ice hockey, Speed skating	4000	
St. Moritz-Celerina Olympic Bobrun	1928 St. Moritz	Bobsleigh	Not listed	
St. Moritz-Celerina Olympic Bobrun	1948 St. Moritz	Bobsleigh	Not listed.	
Saint-Nizier-du-Moucherotte	1968 Grenoble	Ski jumping (large hill)	50,000	
EnergySolutions Arena (was called Delta Center at the time of the games, but renamed Salt Lake Ice Center during the games)	2002 Salt Lake City	Figure skating, Short track speed skating	17,500	
San Sicario Fraiteve	2006 Turin	Alpine skiing (women's combined (downhill), downhill, super-g)	6,160	
Sauze d'Oulx-Jouvencaux	2006 Turin	Freestyle skiing	7,900	
Seefeld	1964 Innsbruck	Biathlon, Cross-country skiing, Nordic combined, Ski jumping (normal hill)	Not listed.	
Seefeld	1976 Innsbruck	Biathlon, Cross-country skiing, Nordic combined, Ski jumping (normal hill)	Not listed.	
Sestiere Borgata	2006 Turin	Alpine skiing (men's combined (downhill), downhill, super-g)	6,800	
Sestiere Colle	2006 Turin	Alpine skiing (combined (slalom), giant slalom, slalom)	7,900	
Skenderija II Hall	1984 Sarajevo	Figure skating, Ice hockey	15,000	
Ski jumping hill	1960 Squaw Valley	Nordic combined (ski jumping), Ski jumping	Not listed.	
Snow Harp	1998 Nagano	Cross-country skiing, Nordic combined (cross-country skiing)	20,000	
Snowbasin	2002 Salt Lake City	Alpine skiing (combined, downhill, super-g)	22,500	
Soldier Hollow	2002 Salt Lake City	Biathlon, Cross-country skiing, Nordic combined (cross-country skiing)	15,200	
Spiral	1998 Nagano	Bobsleigh, Luge	10,000	
Squaw Valley Olympic Skating Rink	1960 Squaw Valley	Ice hockey, Speed skating	Not listed.	
Squaw Valley Ski Resort	1960 Squaw Valley	Alpine skiing	9,650	
Stade Olympique de Chamonix	1924 Chamonix	Cross-country skiing, Curling, Figure skating, Ice hockey, Military patrol, Nordic combined (cross-country skiing), Speed skating	45,000.	
Stadio Olimpico di Torino	2006 Turin	Ceremonies (opening/closing)	35,000	
Stampede Corral	1988 Calgary	Figure skating, Ice hockey	6,475	
Suvretta	1948 St. Moritz	Ice hockey	Not listed.	
