= Eric Pollard (skier) =

American freeskier

Eric Pollard is an American snow freeskier and film editor from Welches, Oregon, who lives in the Hood River region of Oregon. He was a professional skier for Line Skis for over 22 years and now designs skis and snowboards for Season. He has always challenged the status quo by innovating outerwear, accessories, and hard goods for FW Apparel, Anon Optics, Dakine, K2, Causwell, and Hest.

== Skiing ==
Pollard began skiing professionally at the age of fifteen. He learned on Mount Hood, where snowboarders far outnumber skiers, and as a result, developed a unique style more closely resembling snowboarders. Because of this, he developed the first fully symmetrical ski — equal height tip and tail, with a symmetrical flex. Pollard mostly works with filming and skiing backcountry rather than competitions.

== Season ==
With snowboarder Austin Smith, Pollard founded the ski and snowboard company Season EQPT. They design sustainable carving, all-mountain, powder, and touring products. The timeless black products — Kin, Aero, Nexus, Forma, and Pass — question annual consumer culture, support product longevity, and create unity for everyone in the mountains. The skis are made at Amer Sports, and snowboards are made at SWS-Boards. It is the first ski and snowboard brand to be Climate Neutral Certified.

== Nimbus Independent Films ==
In 2007, Pollard created Nimbus Independent with Pep Fujas, Andy Mahre, and Chris Benchetler. Their goal was to show all the ups and downs of skiing as it is. Nimbus was an early producer of webisodes. The company produced short films showing highlights of its creators' seasons. Named Powder Magazine's "Movie of the Year," Drawn From Here is a film by Pollard that opens with an exploration of his processes as a skier, as a ski/product designer, and as an artist. It follows the influences he draws from — like basing the shape of a ski tip off of a surfboard or finding patterns observed in nature to integrate into the graphics he hand draws for a ski — and illuminates a thread that runs through and binds all his different disciplines and hobbies.

== Personal life ==
Pollard initially planned to attend art school to become a graphic designer but loved skiing with his family and never looked back. He is married to Erin Valverde Pollard and has two children.
