= Will Wesson =

American freestyle skier

Personal information
- Born: July 11, 1986 (age 40) Victor, New York, U.S.
Medal record
Men's freestyle skiing
Representing the United States
Gold medal – first place	2016 Aspen	Real Ski

Will Wesson (born 11 July 1986) is an American freestyle skier and an X Games Gold Medalist. Wesson is known for his appearances in Level 1 films and in the Line Traveling Circus.

== Early life ==
Wesson was born to an American father and a Chinese American mother. He grew up skiing in New York State with the "I Hate NY" crew at Bristol Mountain.

== Career ==
For college, Wesson attended the University of Vermont in Burlington. During his time in Vermont, Will was recognized as an up-and-coming park and urban skier by the Meathead Films crew. It was around this time that he made his first appearances in ski films. He won Best Jib at Powder Awards in 2008 for his closing line in his Meathead films segment in “Head for the Hills.” This segment also included his high school friend Andy Parry. Wesson began filming with Level 1 Productions in 2008 and has appeared in every annual film since (Turbo, Eye Trip, Refresh, After Dark, Sunny, Partly Cloudy, Less, Small World, Pleasure, Habit, Zig Zag, Romance).

In the summer of 2008, Wesson, alongside Andy Parry and filmer Shane Mcfalls, developed an online web series called Line Traveling Circus with the help of their sponsor Line Skis. Line Traveling Circus has won numerous awards and is the longest running skiing webisode series.

Wesson has been riding for Line Skis for over 12 years.

In 2016, Wesson won the first ever X Games Real Ski competition.

== Film appearances ==
- Sunny (2012)
- Partly Cloudy (2013)
