= List of Olympic venues in freestyle skiing =

For the Winter Olympics, there are ten venues that have been or will be used for freestyle skiing. The first FIS Freestyle World Ski Championships was held at Tignes, France, in 1986. Two years later at the Winter Olympics in Calgary, the sport was included as a demonstration event though it took place at two different locations. Becoming an official Olympic sport in 1992, the venue chosen was at Tignes, host of the 1986 world championships. The 1997 world championships at Iizuna Kogen would serve as the test event for the venue used for the 1998 Winter Olympics. Deer Valley played host to the 2002 events and would host the world championships in both 2003 and 2011. Whistler, British Columbia hosted the 2001 world championships though the 2010 venue took place at Cypress Mountain in West Vancouver close to the host city.

Games	Venue	Other sports hosted at venue for those games	Capacity	Ref.
1988 Calgary	Canada Olympic Park (includes bobsleigh/luge track) (demonstration)	Bobsleigh, Luge, Nordic combined (ski jumping), Ski jumping	25,000 (bobsleigh/luge); 35,000 (ski jumping); 15,000 (freestyle)	
1988 Calgary	Nakiska (demonstration)	Alpine skiing	Not listed.	
1992 Albertville	Tignes	None	Not listed.	
1994 Lillehammer	Kanthaugen Freestyle Arena	None	15,000	
1998 Nagano	Iizuna Kogen Ski Area	None	12,000	
2002 Salt Lake City	Deer Valley	Alpine skiing (slalom)	13,400	
2006 Turin	Sauze d'Oulx-Jouvencaux	None	7,900	
2010 Vancouver	Cypress Mountain	Snowboarding	8,000	
2014 Sochi	Freestyle Skiing Center and Snowboard Park	Snowboarding	8,000 (freestyle skiing); 8,000 (snowboarding)	
2018 PyeongChang	Phoenix Snow Park	Snowboarding (excluding big air)	18,000 (including 7,800 standing)	
2022 Beijing	Genting Snow Park	Snowboarding (excluding big air)	Not listed.	
2026 Milan-Cortina	Mottolino/Sitas-Tagliede/Carosello 3000	Snowboarding	Not listed.	
2030 French Alps	Briançon (aerials, moguls, halfpipe)	Snowboarding	3,500-5,000	
2030 French Alps	Montgenèvre (big air, slopestyle)	Snowboarding	3,500-5,000	
2030 French Alps	TBA (ski cross)	Snowboarding	Not listed.	
2034 Utah	Utah Olympic Park (cross)	Snowboarding	8,000	
2034 Utah	Park City (halfpipe, slopestyle)	Snowboarding	15,000	
2034 Utah	Deer Valley (aerials, moguls)	None	12,000	
2034 Utah	Olympic Medals Plaza (big air)	Snowboarding (big air)	25,000	

== Gallery of venues ==
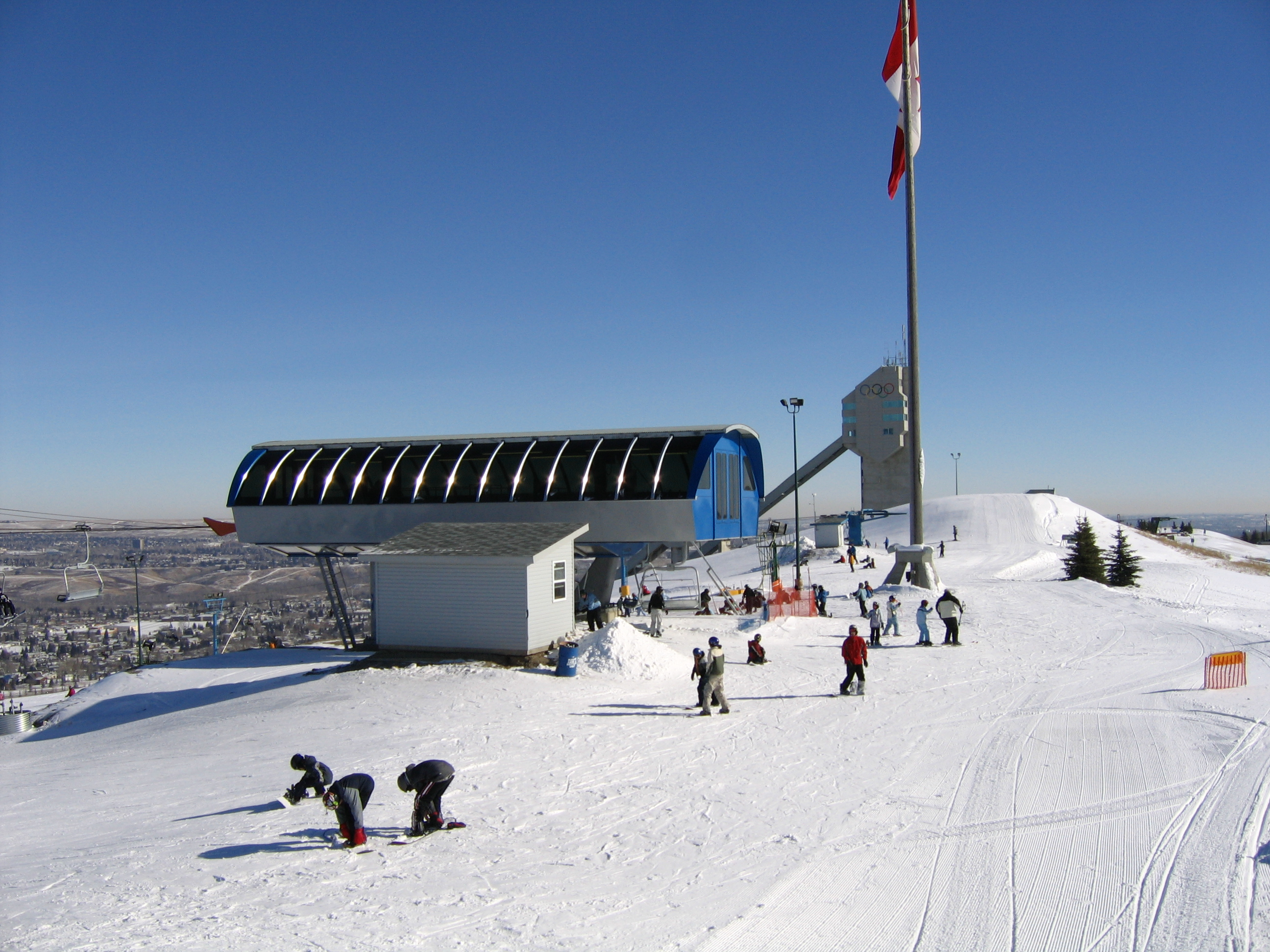
Canada Olympic Park hosted freestyle skiing at the 1988 Winter Olympics in Calgary.

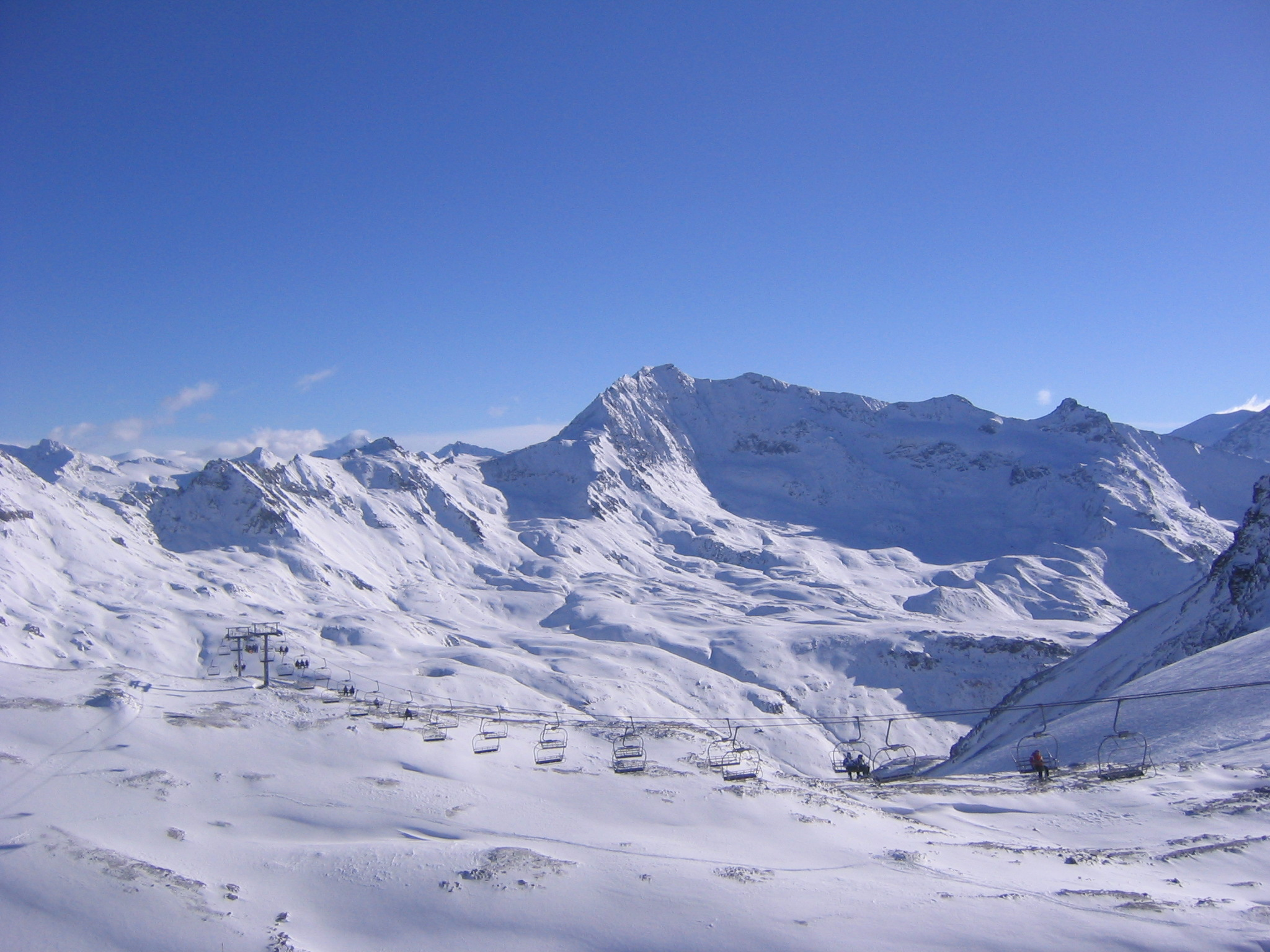
Tignes hosted freestyle skiing at the 1992 Winter Olympics in Albertville.

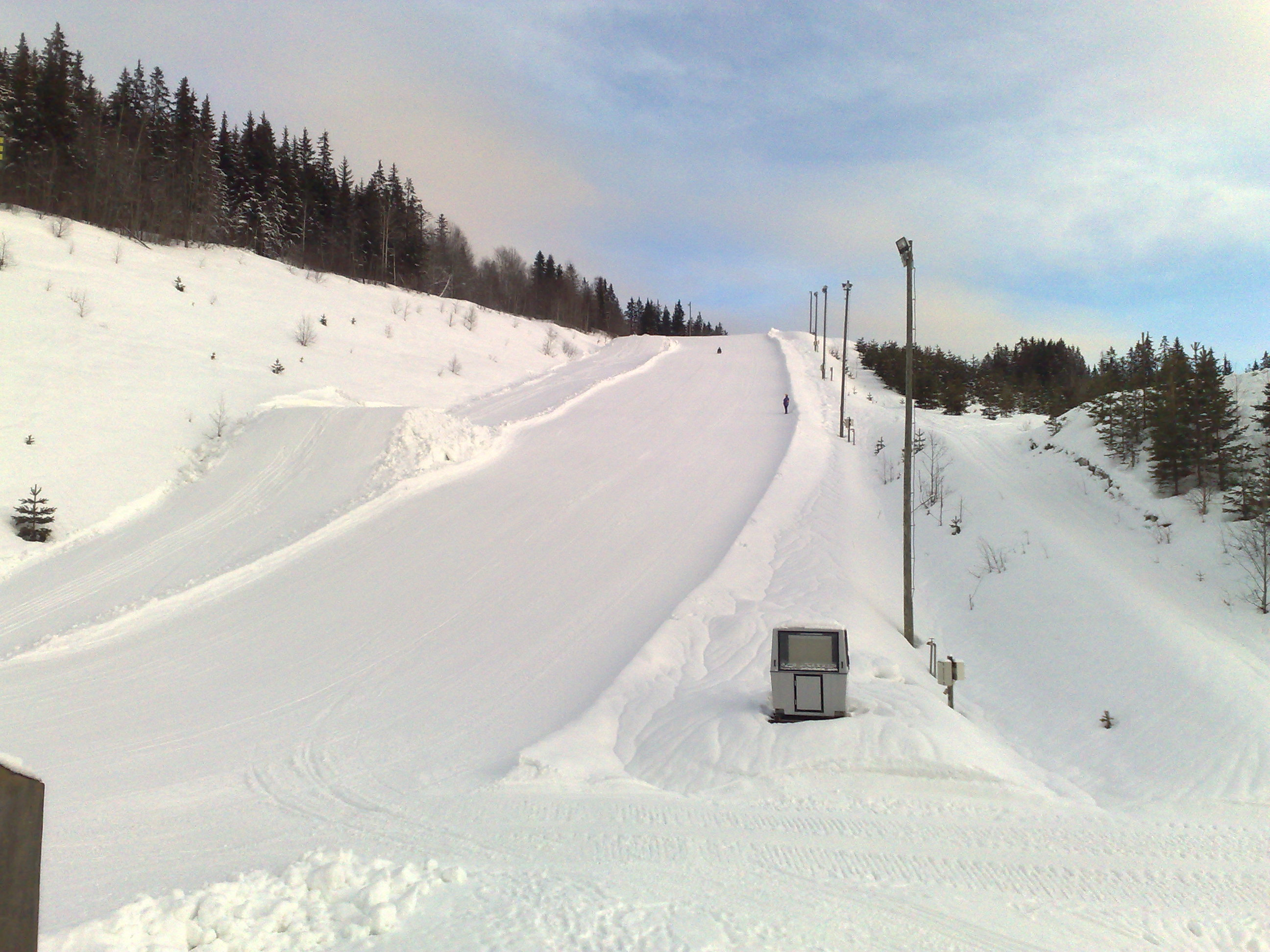
Kanthaugen Freestyle Arena hosted freestyle skiing at the 1994 Winter Olympics in Lillehammer.

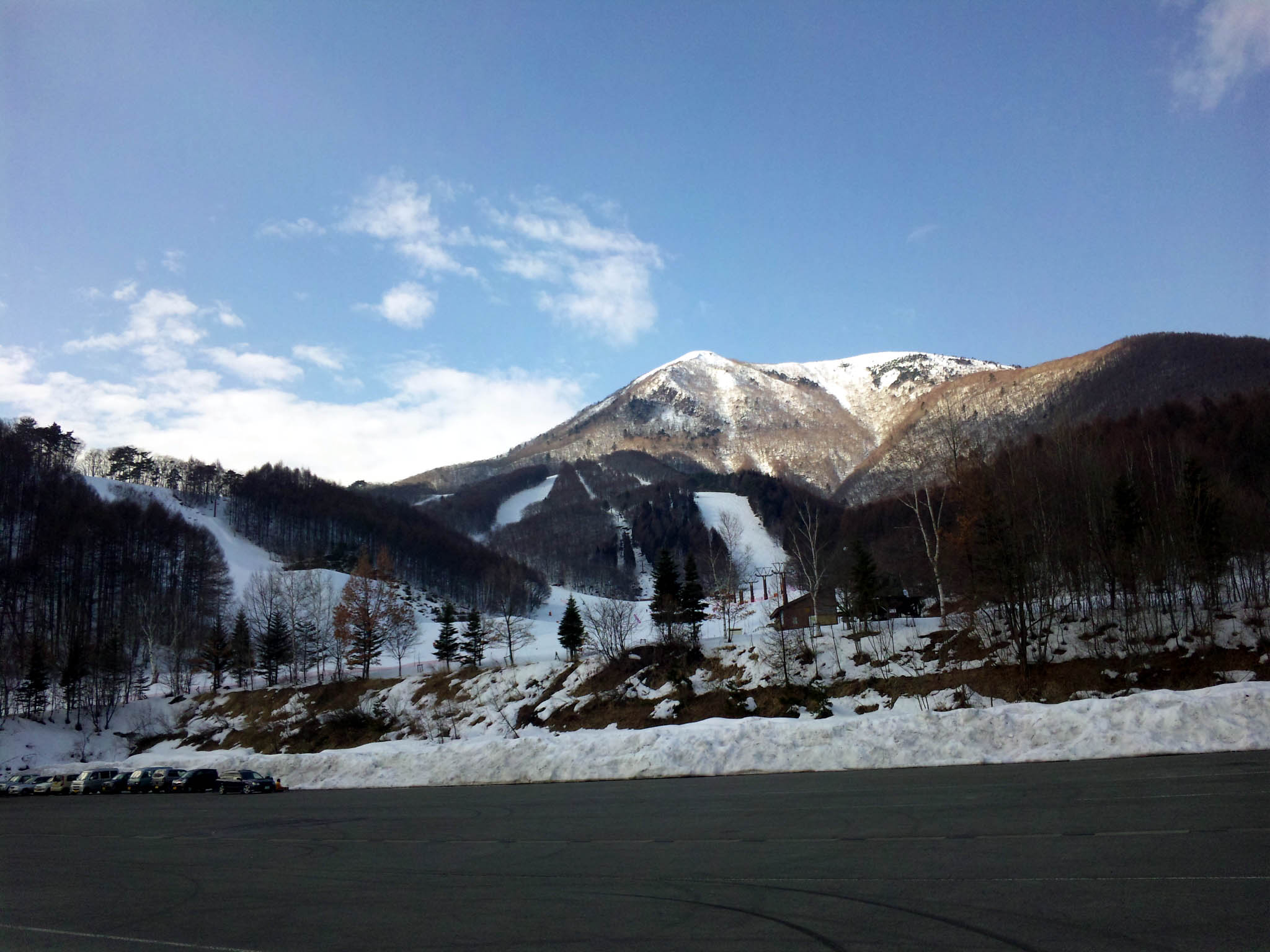
Iizuna Kogen Ski Area hosted freestyle skiing at the 1998 Winter Olympics in Nagano.

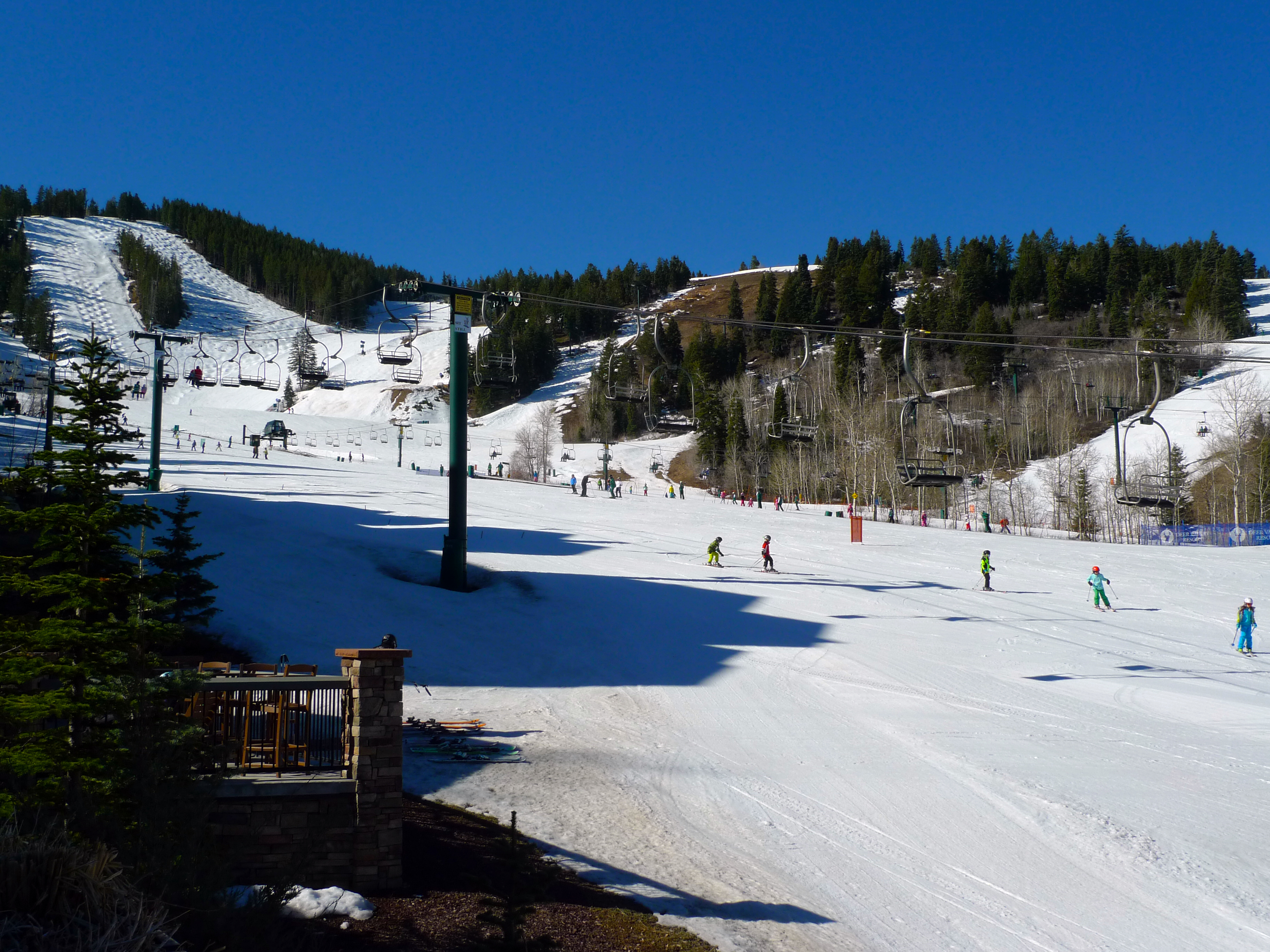
Deer Valley hosted freestyle skiing at the 2002 Winter Olympics in Salt Lake City and will do so again at the 2034 Winter Olympics in Utah.

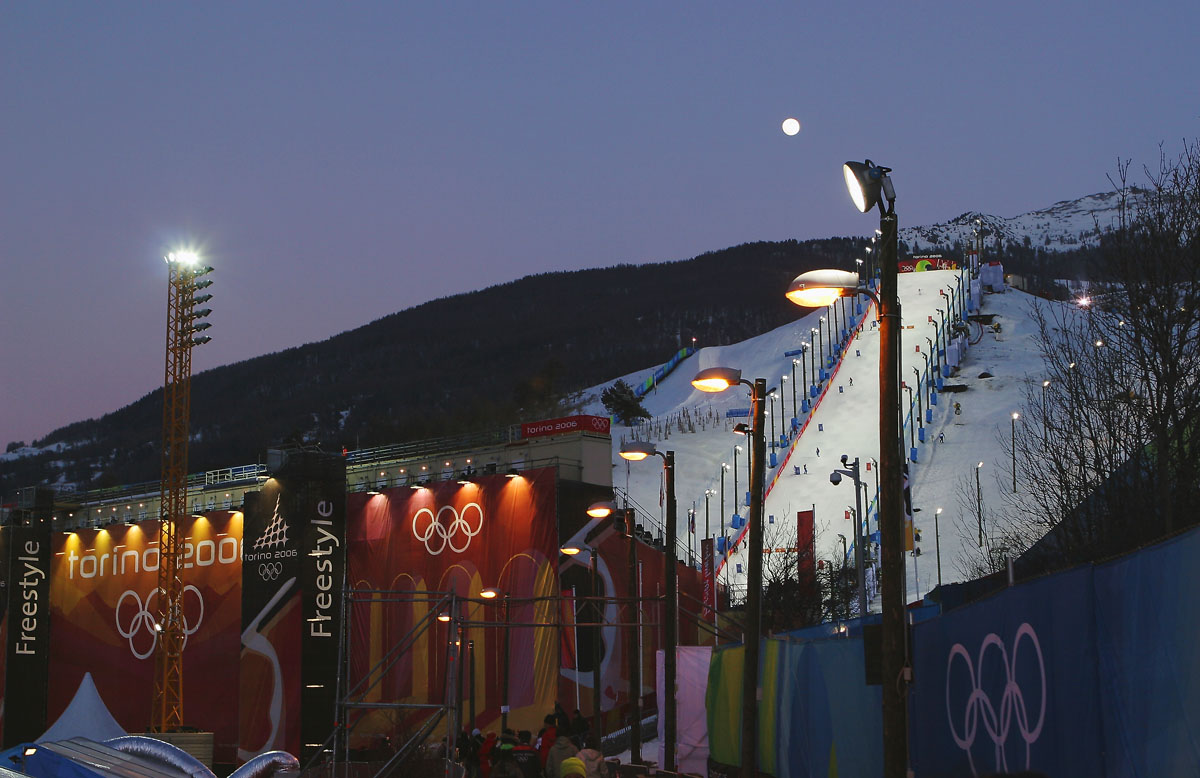
Sauze d'Oulx-Jouvenceaux hosted freestyle skiing at the 2006 Winter Olympics in Turin.

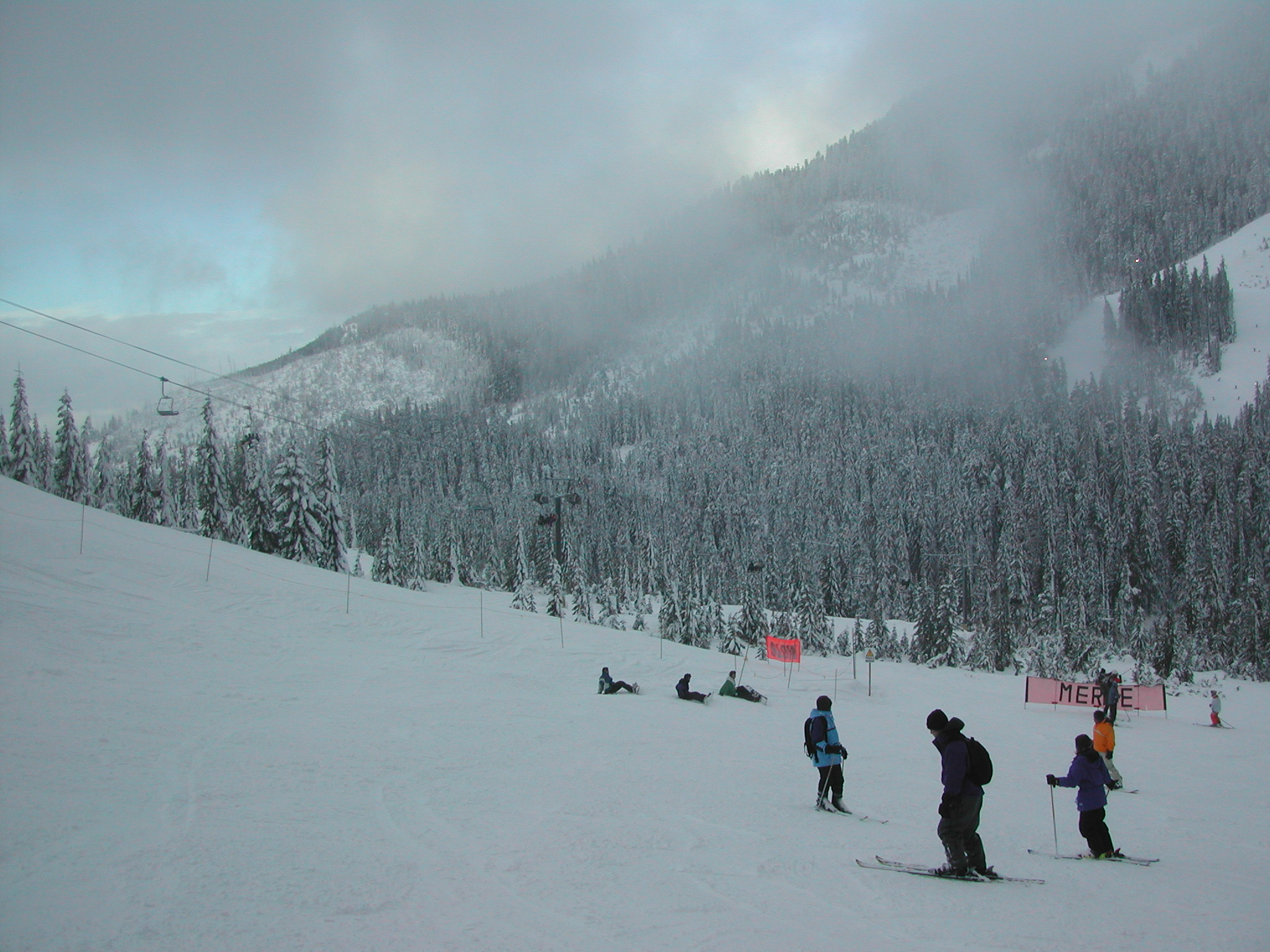
Cypress Mountain hosted freestyle skiing events at the 2010 Winter Olympics in Vancouver.

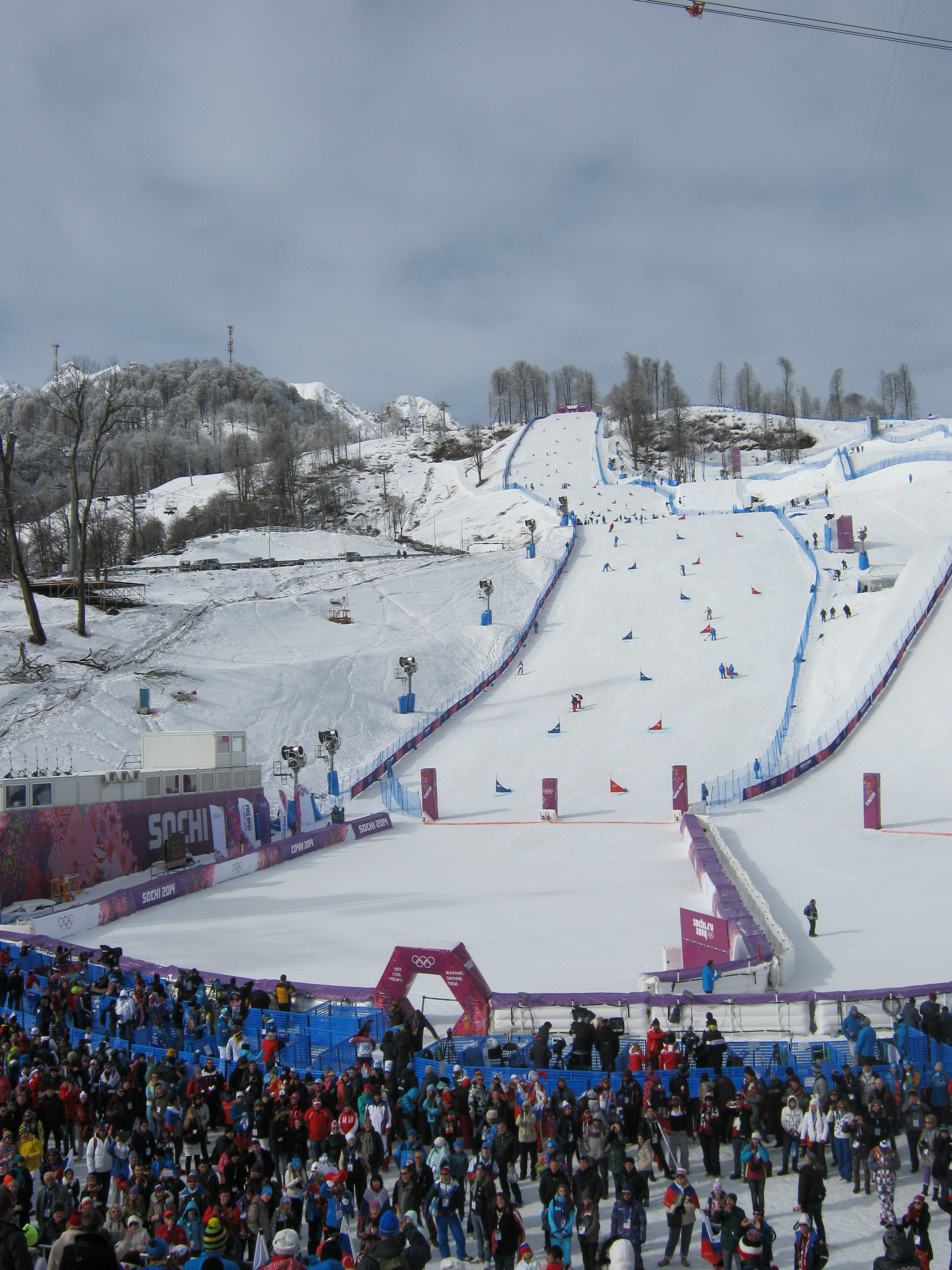
Rosa Khutor Extreme Park hosted freestyle skiing at the 2014 Winter Olympics in Sochi.

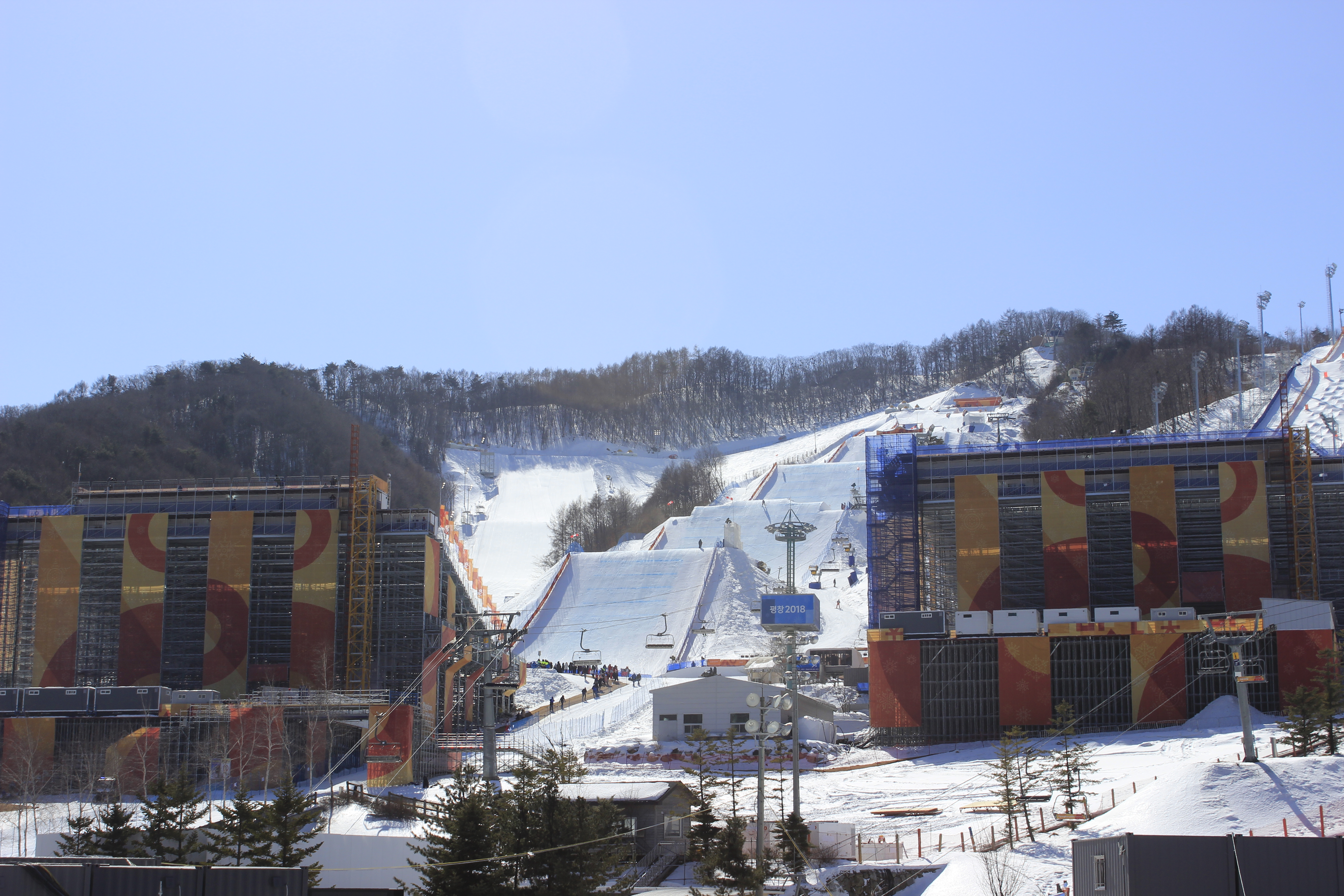
Phoenix Snow Park hosted freestyle skiing at the 2018 Winter Olympics in Pyeongchang.

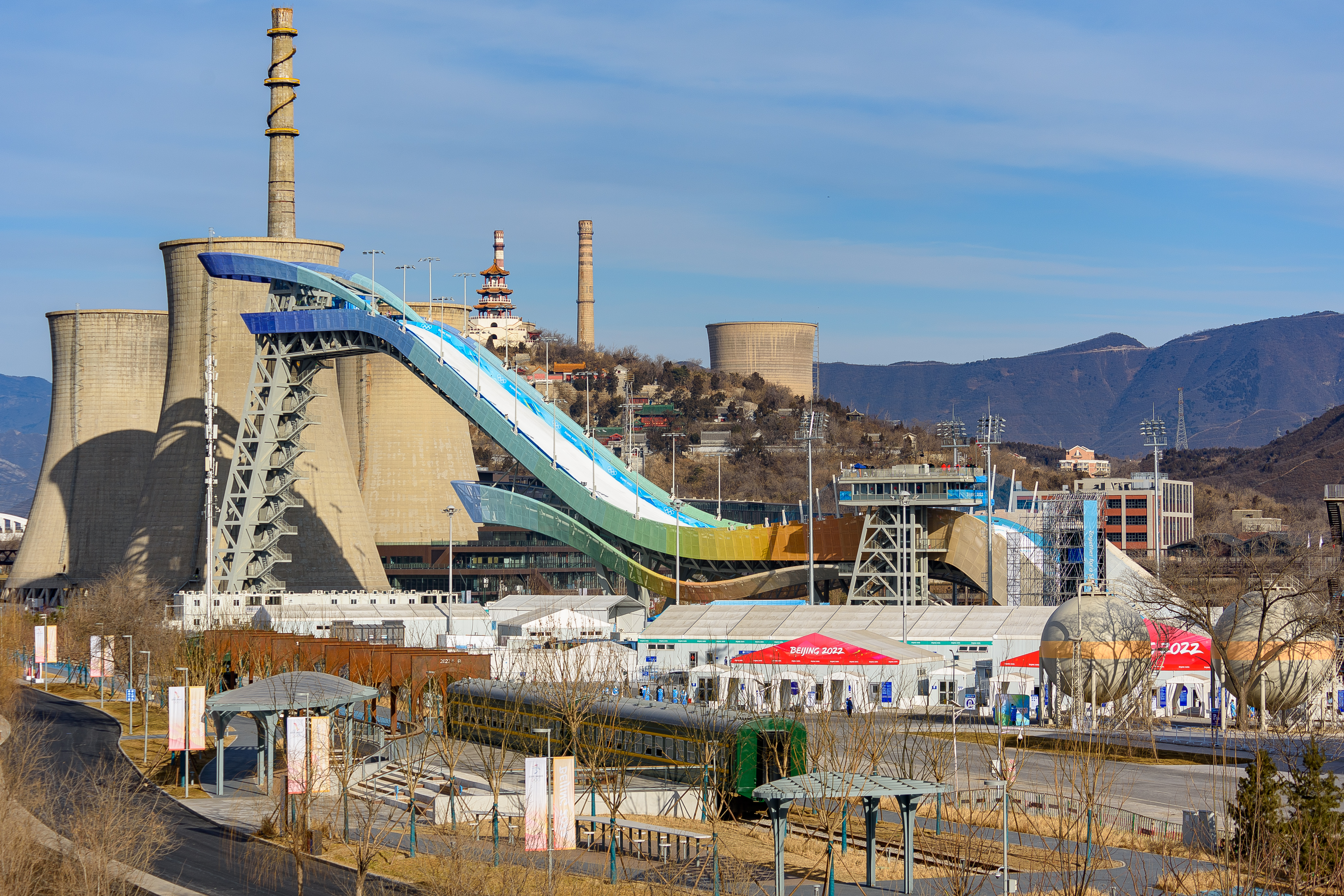
Genting Snow Park hosted freestyle skiing at the 2022 Winter Olympics in Beijing.

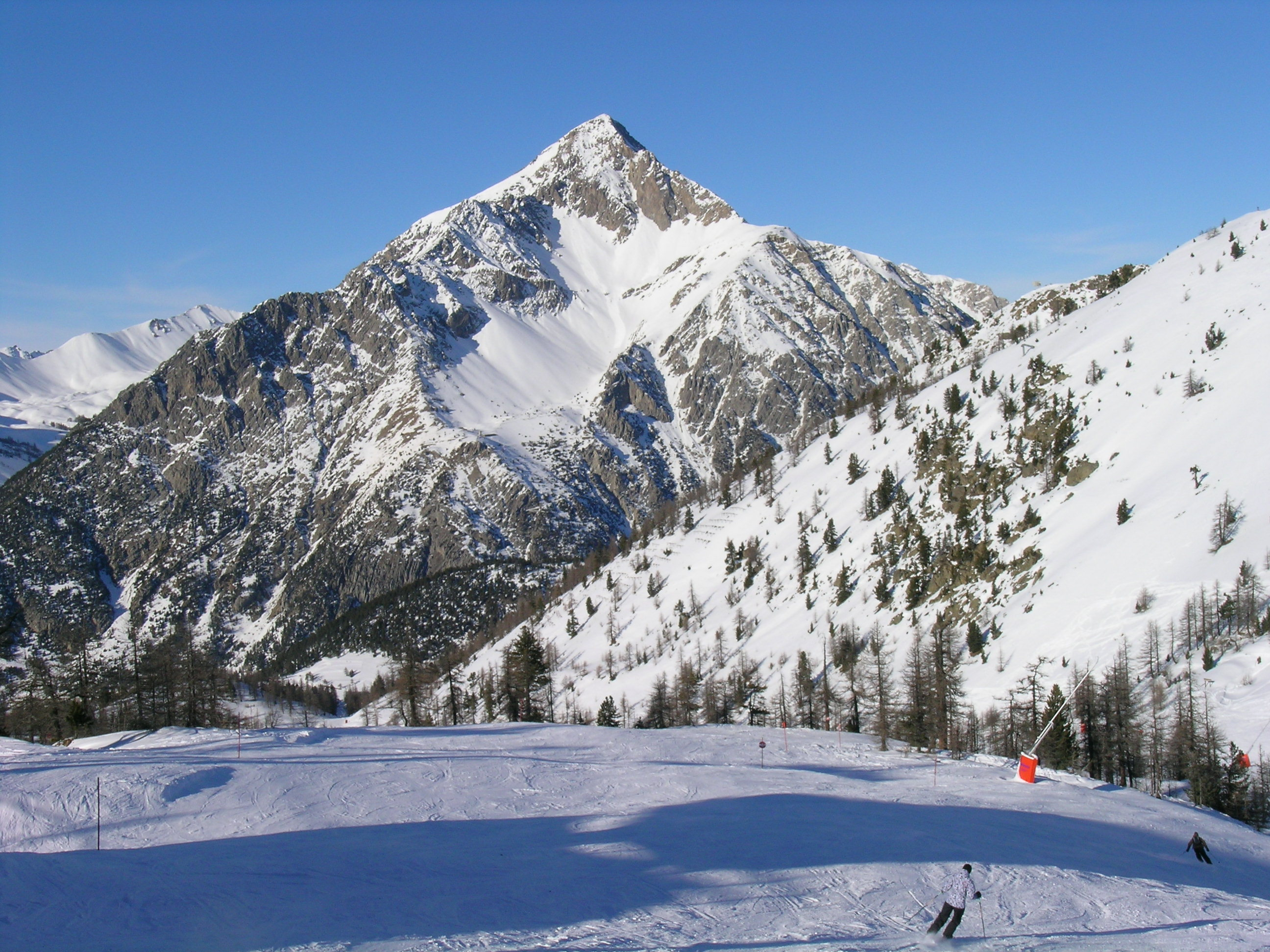
Montgenèvre will host big air and slopestyle at the 2030 Winter Olympics in the French Alps.
