= Icer Air =

Snowboard event held 2005-2008 in California, United States

Icer Air, stylized as ICER AIR, was an urban big-air ski and snowboard event held in 2005 on Fillmore Street in San Francisco and at or near AT&T Park from 2006 through 2008.

== History ==
ICER founders Glen Griffin originally created the Icer Air event with Olympic gold medalist Jonny Moseley to promote ICER, a sports products company that developed a new type of aerosol spray-on ski and snowboard wax.

The first event was originally scheduled for August 2005, but was delayed after neighborhood opposition. After the city granted the necessary permit, on September 29, 2005, over 15,000 people showed up to watch the event, for which several tons of snow were applied to the steep blocks of Fillmore Street between Broadway and Green.

The event was moved across town in 2006 to AT&T Park, home of the San Francisco Giants, creating the first stadium big-air ski and snowboard contest to be held in the United States. With the financial backing of Esurance, Icer Air was held annually and expanded to include more events through 2008, after which the sponsor backed out and the event was no longer held.

A 110-foot (34 m) tall, 60-foot (18 m) wide, 350-foot (110 m) long scaffold jump took five days to build, and was covered with 200 tons of man-made snow. Icer Air featured BMX, skate, and wakeboard competitions, as well as bands such as Jurassic 5, Ladytron, Mos Def, and Talib Kweli. The ICER AIR event drew over 25,000 people and generated over 450 million media impressions annually. Athletes participating included skaters Tony Hawk and Pierre-Luc Gagnon, Olympic and X Games gold medal snowboarders Travis Rice and Danny Kass, and X Games gold medal skiers Jon Olsson and Simon Dumont.

A scandal arose in 2008 when athletes and others did not receive promised fees and reimbursements for appearing. The event was forced to downsize then shut down completely after losing its main sponsorship funding during the 2008 financial crisis.

== Chronology ==
- September 29, 2005, San Francisco - Fillmore Street

Winners: C.R. Johnson - ski, J.J. Thomas - snowboard

- November 4, 2006, San Francisco – AT&T Park

Winners: T.J. Schiller - ski, Travis Rice - snowboard

- November 3, 2007, San Francisco – AT&T Park

Winners: Jon Olsson - ski, Travis Rice - snowboard

- October 8, 2008, San Francisco – McCovey Cove

== See also ==
- Air & Style
- Dew Action Sports Tour
- X Games
