= Gapes =

Gapes may refer to:

== People ==
- James Gapes (1822–1899), politician in Christchurch, New Zealand
- Mike Gapes (born 1952), British politician
- Thomas Gapes (1848–1913), Mayor of Christchurch, New Zealand
- Vivienne Gapes (born 1959), New Zealand Paralympic skier

== Places ==
- Gapes Valley, New Zealand

== Other uses ==
- Gapes, bird disease caused by gapeworm

== See also ==
- Gaping (disambiguation)
