= 4FRNT Skis =

American ski equipment brand

4FRNT Skis, LLC
- Company type: Private
- Industry: Sports
- Founded: 2002; 24 years ago in Truckee, California, US
- Headquarters: Burlington, Vermont, US
- Products: Skis, poles, bindings
- Website: 4frnt.com

4FRNT Skis is an independent brand of alpine ski equipment that helped pioneer the development of the freeskiing movement. 4FRNT introduced the business model of 'skier-owned and operated' to the sport of alpine skiing.

Products manufactured by 4FRNT include skis, poles, bindings, and accessories.

== History ==
4FRNT Skis was founded by professional skier Matt Sterbenz in 2002 in a garage in Truckee, CA. The first ski was made with a fence post, an old ski, and scrap wood. Matt Sterbenz successfully hand-pressed this first pair of skis with help from a snowboarder friend.

Sterbenz started 4FRNT to cement change in the ski industry. At the time, there was a need for skis that were focused on freeride and freestyle skiing. Larger ski companies eventually made a twin-tipped freeride ski; but, skiers complained that construction was too similar to heavier, older racing skis. 4FRNT's production soon moved to a factory setting in 2003.

In 2004, 4FRNT products were unveiled at the Las Vegas SIA show, right when the company's first park ski went into production. 4FRNT moved to a new headquarters in Salt Lake City in 2005. At the time, Eric Hjorleifson and Steele Spence held top spots of the small athlete team, while Matt Sterbenz became an athlete/brand owner for 4FRNT. This is the beginning of the “by skiers for skiers” mantra which continues to lead 4FRNT as they create pro-model skis for their athletes, and skis that passionate skiers love. In 2006 production was outsourced to Europe, to the Elan Factory. 4FRNT changed its logo in 2007. CR Johnson joined the 4FRNT team in 2009, delivering new concepts to ski design, as a new owner was brought in.

In 2017, long-time skier and industry pioneer, Jason Levinthal, acquired 4FRNT Skis from Matt Sterbenz. Jason decided to build 4FRNT alongside his pre-existing company, J Skis, moving the headquarters from Utah to Vermont. Jason restructured the company alongside Matt Sterbenz, to make sure 4FRNT stayed true to its roots. 4FRNT transformed into a Direct to Consumer brand under Levinthal. 4FRNT began working with Utopie MFG in Quebec, Canada, to help produce some of their skis.

== The White Room - Product Innovation ==
The White Room was first introduced to the 4FRNT community in 2010. The White Room served as a production and prototype facility. A number of different ski models were produced in house in Salt Lake City, Utah within The White Room. Prototypes were then sold to customers in local Salt Lake City community. If a prototype received positive feedback from skiers, it would be sent to the Elan factory in Slovenia for a larger manufacturing run. 4FRNT used the help of team skiers such as Eric Hjorleifson, Thayne Rich, and others, to press these skis in the White Room. Design and manufacture of such skis were done in the White Room until 2017.

Although the ski press was relocated to Washington, the company continues with the concept of the White Room. Athletes, designers, engineers, and testers consistently collaborate during the design process. 4FRNT now works with its factory, Utopie MFG, to produce prototypes which are then shipped to riders globally for testing as well as feedback.

== Team ==
4FRNT's team of sponsored skiers consists of:

- Eric Hjorleifson
- Thayne Rich
- Stinius Skjotskift
- Marty Schaffer
- Noah Maisonet
- Jake Doan
- Ian Hamilton
- Mallory Duncan
- Corinne Prevot
- Nessa Dziemian
- Benny Mikes
- Bennett Kobe
- Ben Hoiness
- Erme Catino
- Sam Watson
- Corey Nugent
- Kelly Mackenzie
- Eric Lee O'Brien
- Keree Smith
- Josh Randich

== Products ==
4FRNT manufactures skis, poles, gear and apparel. Skis are produced at Utopie MFG in Canada

Current Skis Produced

- MSP Series - Named after original owner Matt Sterbenz (Matt Sterbenz Pro), these ski models are best for all-mountain skiing.
  - MSP 91
  - MSP 99
  - MSP CC
  - MSP 107
- Hoji Collection - Designed by team skier, Eric Hjorleifson, these skis are geared for backcountry and powder skiing. All models feature 4FRNT's 4-Lock skin system.
  - Raven - First ski to feature 4-Lock system
  - Nevar
  - Hoji
  - Renegade
- Freeride Collection - 4FRNT's current lineup of skis made for freeride and freestyle skiers.
  - Switch
  - Devastator
  - Devastator Jr.
  - Inthayne

=== Notable Past Ski Models ===
- EHP - Eric Hjorleifson's Pro Model Ski - Led to both the Hoji and Renegade, skis currently being produced.
- TNK - Niklas Karlstrom's Pro Model Ski
- STL - Steele Spence's Pro Model Ski
- VCT and VCT Turbo - Vincent Dorian's Pro Model Skis. Inspired the Devastator, a current model.
- MSP - Matt Sterbenz's Pro Model Ski - Original Iteration was geared towards freestyle skiing.
- CRJ - CR Johnson's Pro Model Powder Ski
