= Gaper Day =

Local tradition at North American ski resorts

Gaper Day is a mountain tradition that takes place in ski resorts across North America. It is the day when locals can dress in the most ridiculous outfits and pretend to be like their gaper counterparts. Their getup can range from no or very limited clothing (only shorts) to the most retro ski attire there is. It is traditionally celebrated on April Fools' Day, when the snow starts melting and the temperatures are warmer.

According to a local reporter at Jackson Hole Ski Resort, Gaper Day "is a Spring right [sic] of passage for those who live in mountain towns. It is a day that can provide large amounts of entertainment as locals do their best to poke a little fun at the tourists with which they have dealt throughout the season."

== Participating resorts ==
- Jackson Hole
- Arapahoe Basin
- Brighton
- Boler Mountain
- Copper Mountain
- Keystone
- Park City
- Purgatory
- Solitude
- Steamboat
- Vail
- Whistler Blackcomb
- Palisades Tahoe

Breckenridge
