= Völkl =

German sports equipment company

- Type: GmbH
- Industry: Sports equipment
- Founded: 1923; 103 years ago
- Founder: Georg Völkl
- Headquarters: Straubing, Germany
- Products: Skis, ski poles, ski skins Tennis racquets and accessories
- Website: volkl.com (skis) volkltennis.com (tennis)

Völkl (or Voelkl; German pronunciation: [fœlkl]) is a German sports equipment brand, founded in 1923 in Straubing, Bavaria. The brand currently produces alpine skiing and tennis equipment and accessories.

Since 2017, the Völkl ski brand has been part of Bellevue, Washington-based Elevate Outdoor Collective, a snowsports company held by private equity firm Kohlberg & Company. Elevate's other brands include Marker, Dalbello, and the K2 Sports group of brands.

Völkl tennis racquets are produced by a separate company, Völkl Tennis, at a factory in Bogen, Germany.

== Product History ==
=== Skiing ===
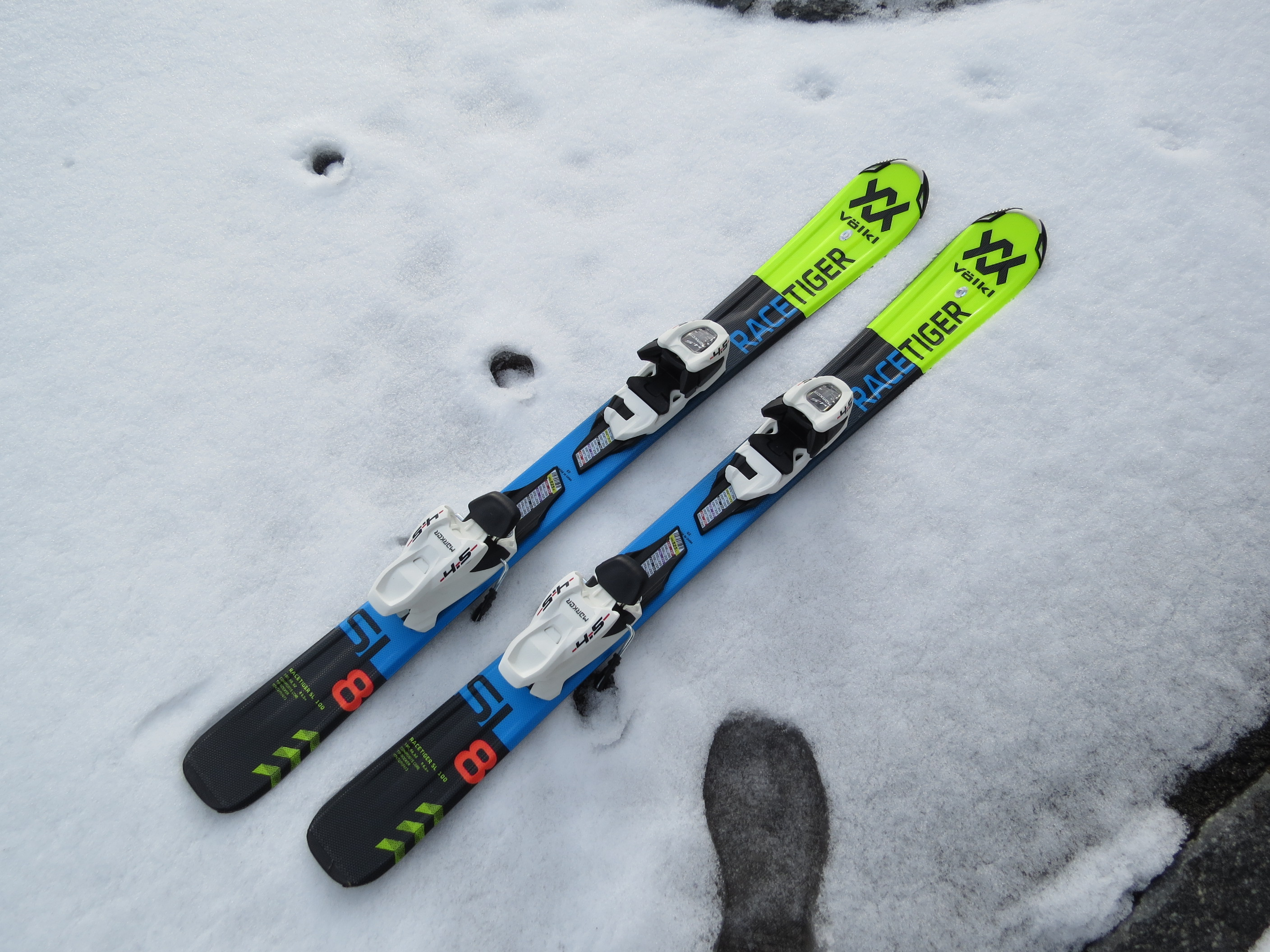
Völkl skis

In the 1910s, Franz Völkl began producing boats, sleds, and horse-drawn carriages under his name. His son Georg took over in 1923, producing the company's first skis. In the early 1950s, under Georg's leadership, the company became a leading European ski manufacturer.

Jarden Action Sports at one time owned the Völkl and Marker brands. In 2007, Jarden acquired K2 and LINE. Jarden was acquired by Newell in 2016. Newell sold Völkl and K2 to Kohlberg & Company in 2017, leading to the creation of Elevate Outdoor Collective.

Völkl produced snowboards from 1997 until 2017.

Current or recent Völkl ski racers include Katharina Truppe, Markus Salcher, Adriana Jelinkova, Harry Laidlaw, Istok Rodes, Leona Popovic, Sam Maes, Sebastian Holzmann, Stefano Gross, Reece Howden, and Stefan Luitz.

=== Tennis ===
Völkl tennis racquets were first produced in the early 1970s. Their Zebra racquet was one of the first to be made of composite materials, rather than wood. Their racquets have been used by players such as Boris Becker, John McEnroe, Michael Stich, Sergi Bruguera, Petr Korda, Jana Novotna, Stefanie Vögele, Liezel Huber, and Laura Siegemund.

Since 1994, the company's signature model has been the V1 Classic.
