= Rønning Treski =

Norwegian manufacturer of wood skis

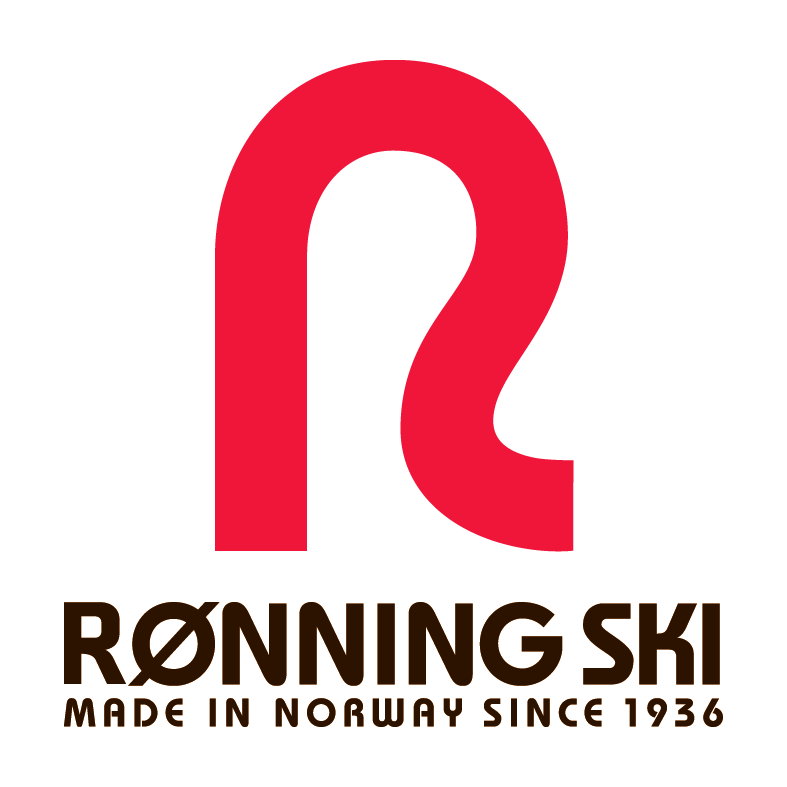
Rønning Treski Logo

Rønning Treski is the only remaining producer of wood skis in Norway.

The production takes place in the village of Skotterud in Eidskog Municipality, in the southern part of Innlandet county. Wood skis have been produced for over 100 years at the location. In 1936, Paul Rønning bought the company, rebranded it, and decided to focus on producing skis. The company is still a family owned company, currently run by third generation Rønning.

Rønning Treski has been the only producer of wood skis in Norway since 1992. Rønning Treski produces several types of skies; Telemark, Downhill, Cross country, Hunting, Children, etc. Not only is the whole production process hand made in Norway, the wood materials are also 100% Norwegian.
