= Moment Skis =

American ski company

- Industry: Skiing, Snowsports, Creativity, Manufacturing
- Founded: Reno, USA (2003)
- Headquarters: Sparks, Nevada, USA
- Website: www.momentskis.com

Moment Skis is a company building skis.

== Background ==
Moment was founded in 2003 by Casey Hakansson who learned how to build skis working in a Reno snowboard manufacturing shop. By 2010 it had grown to where it moved into its own manufacturing location in Sparks.

The company enjoyed time in the spotlight when Moment skis were worn in the 2010 Olympic Winter Games by athletes Shannon Bahrke, who won bronze in moguls, and Heather McPhie in the 2010 Winter Olympic Games.

== Sponsorship ==
In 2007, Moment added freeskier Josh Bibby to its sponsored team. Bibby's pro model became Moment's bestselling ski. In 2018, Moment added freeskier David Wise to its sponsored team, shortly before he went on to win Gold in the Freestyle Skiing Men's Ski Halfpipe at Phoenix Snow Park at the 2018 Winter Olympics
