= Mark Abma =

Canadian skier

Personal information
- Nickname: "Abadigima"
- Nationality: Canadian
- Born: March 3, 1980

Sport
- Sport: Big Mountain
Medal record
2005 and 2007 Powder Video Award - Best Male Performance

Mark Abma (born March 3, 1980) is a professional freeskier from Whistler Blackcomb, British Columbia. He has won numerous awards, including the Powder Video Award for Best Male Performance in 2007 and 2005. Abma was first known as a mogul and park skier, but moved on to the back country and heliskiing later in his career. He has been featured in many extreme skiing movies.

== Career ==
Abma started skiing on Sasquatch Mountain in 1994 when the Hemlock Ski Club was first developed. He was a part of that program until 1998, when he moved to Whistler to join the provincial freestyle ski team. Abma first starred in a Matchstick Productions film in 2003, shortly after he won “skier of the year.”

== Projects ==
Recently, Mark has started up an advocacy group called One Step, whose goal is to help skiers and ski resorts reduce their carbon footprint.

Moreover, Abma helped Salomon to design their ski called the "Shogun".

== Career achievements ==
Competition results:

- 4th 2003 U.S Open Big Air
- 5th 2003 U.S Open Slopestyle

Awards

- 2010: Powder Video Awards - Best Natural Air (In Deep, Matchstick Productions)
- 2009: Powder Video Awards - Best Powder (Claim, Matchstick Productions)
- 2007: Powder Video Awards - Best Male Performance (Push, Matchstick Productions)
- 2005: Powder Video Awards - Best Male Performance (Yearbook, Matchstick Productions)

== Filmography ==
- Into The Mind (2013) by Sherpas Cinema
- Superheroes of Stoke (2012) by Matchstick Productions (MSP)
- All.I.Can (2011) by Sherpas Cinema
- Attack of la Niña (2011) by Matchstick Productions (MSP)
- The Way I See It (2010) by MSP
- In Deep: The Skiing Experience (2009) by MSP
- Everyday Is Saturday (2009) by Poor Boyz Productions (PBP)
- Claim (2008) by MSP
- Reasons (2008) by PBP
- Seven Sunny Days (2007) by MSP
- Push (2006) by MSP
- The Hit List (2005) by MSP
- War (2005) by PBP
- Session 51 (2005) by Warren Miller (WM)
- Yearbook (2004) by MSP
- Impact (2004) by WM
- X = 10 (2004) by PBP
- Ready, Fire, Aim (2003) by PBP
- Focused (2003) by MSP
- Forward (2003) by Level 1
- Abma appeared in over a dozen Salomon Freeski TV episodes.
- Abma also appeared alongside Sean Pettit in the Red Bull series "Keep your tips up"
