= La Sportiva =

Footwear company

- Type: Società per azioni (S.p.A)
- Industry: Footwear
- Founded: 1928; 98 years ago
- Founder: Narciso Delladio
- Headquarters: Ziano di Fiemme, Italy
- Area served: Worldwide
- Products: Footwear, hiking, mountain running, snowsports, climbing, ski boots, skies
- Number of employees: 466 (2022)
- Website: www.lasportiva.com

La Sportiva is an Italian footwear brand and company founded in 1928 by Narciso Delladio in Italy.

== History ==
Narciso Delladio started his business by manufacturing boots and clogs for farmers and lumberjacks. In World War II, he helped to provide Italy's soldiers with custom mountaineering boots. In the 1950s, he began to make ski boots and first introduced the brand name of La Sportiva.

In January 2024, it opened its first store in the United States of America in Boulder, Colorado.

== Description ==
La Sportiva is a brand of footwear for mountaineering, climbing and skiing. Its products are distributed in Europe and North America. La Sportiva is known for its footwear designed for outdoor sports like climbing, running, hiking, and skiing. The company's product line includes specialized equipment for a variety of terrain, including technical rock faces.

It sponsors athletes across a number of sports including mountain running, rock climbing, ice climbing, alpine climbing and skiing. The company had previously collaborated with Tommy Caldwell in the development of the TC Pro climbing shoe. This was the shoe that Caldwell used while making his ascent of the Dawn Wall and by Alex Honnold for the Free Solo of El Capitan.
