= Noworyta =

Noworyta (Polish pronunciation: [nɔvɔˈrɨta]) is a surname. Notable people include:

- Paul Noworyta, American vert skater
- Przemysław Noworyta, Polish figure skater
