= Gaping (animal behavior) =

Animal mouth display

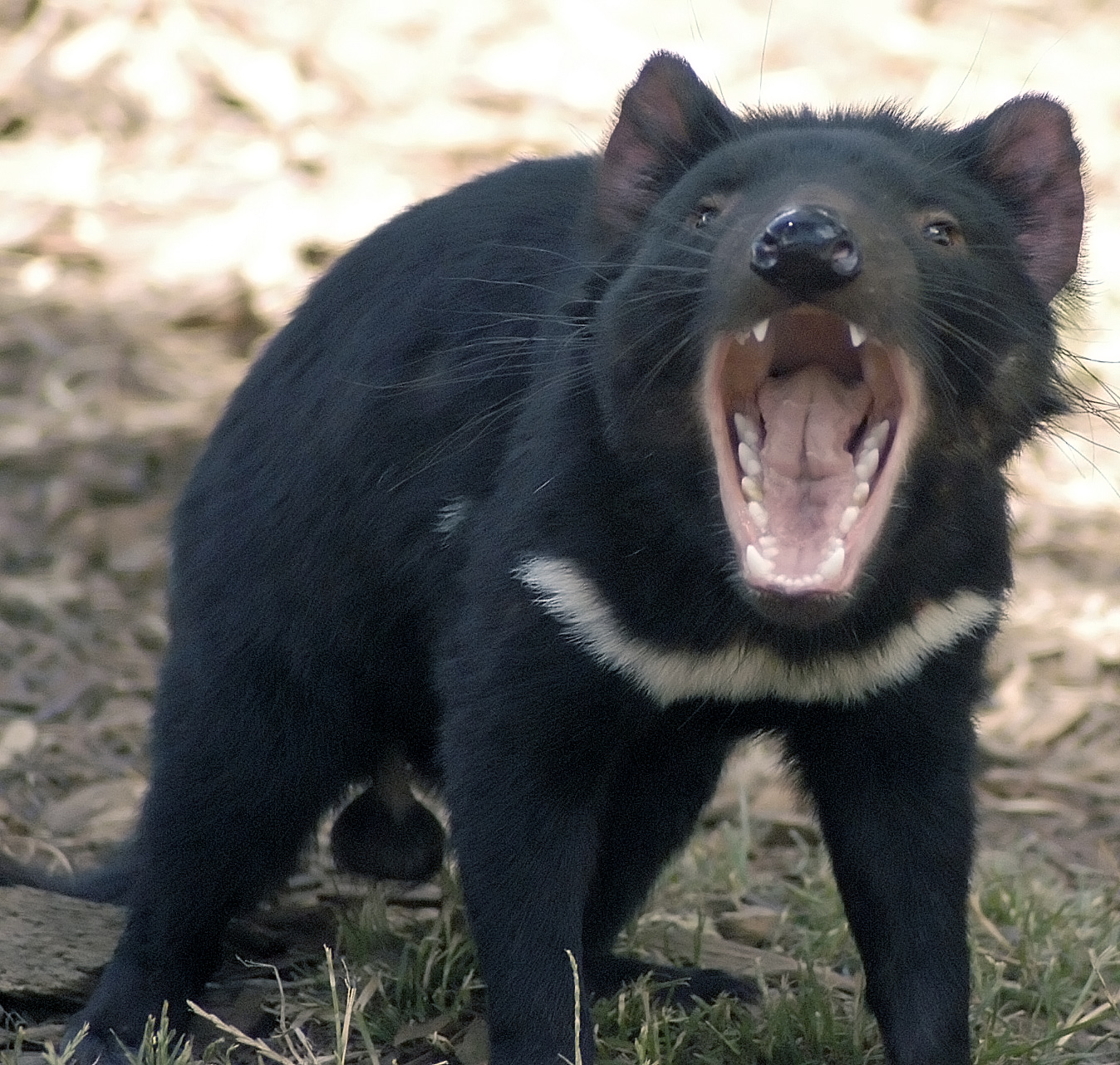
Tasmanian devil in defensive stance, gaping.

Gaping is a common form of behavior in the animal kingdom, in which an animal opens its mouth widely and displays the interior of its mouth, for any of various purposes. This may be a form of deimatic behaviour, colloquially known as a startle display or threat display, as it enlarges the appearance of the animal, and for those with teeth it shows the threat that these represent. Animals may also use gaping as part of a courtship display, or to otherwise communicate with each other. Some animals have evolved features which make gaping behavior more visually effective; in many reptiles the oral mucosa may be a bright color. Gaping is part of the shark agonistic display, and is also found in snakes such as the cottonmouth, and in birds ranging from seagulls to puffins to roosters.

A number of species of bird use a gaping, open beak in their fear and threat displays. Some augment the display by hissing or breathing heavily, while others clap their beaks. In birds, the muscles that depress the lower mandible are usually weak, but certain birds have well-developed digastric muscles that aid in gaping actions. In most birds, these muscles are relatively small as compared to the jaw muscles of similarly sized mammals. Both male and female puffins use gaping as a prominent part of their threat display, with "a range of intensities" based on the situation, and with puffins engaging in territorial gape contests, where they mirror each other until one gives up and leaves, or an actual fight occurs.

Some animals are named for their tendency to use gaping as a threat display, or for the features that become apparent when making such a display. For example, the cottonmouth is so named because the white lining of its mouth is visible when gaping. Other snakes, such as the Western Massasauga, have been observed to engage in gaping behavior which "appears to be unrelated to any threat".

== Gallery of images ==
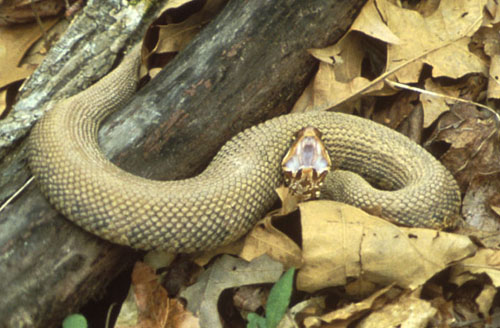
A. p. piscivorus – gaping is part of the typical threat display, the white mouth giving it the nickname "cottonmouth".

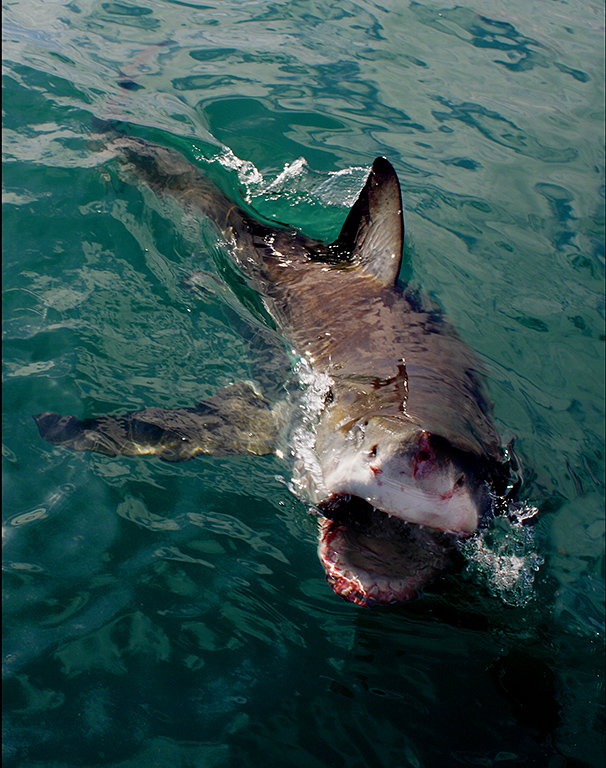
Clear agonistic gaping behavior observed in Great White Shark.

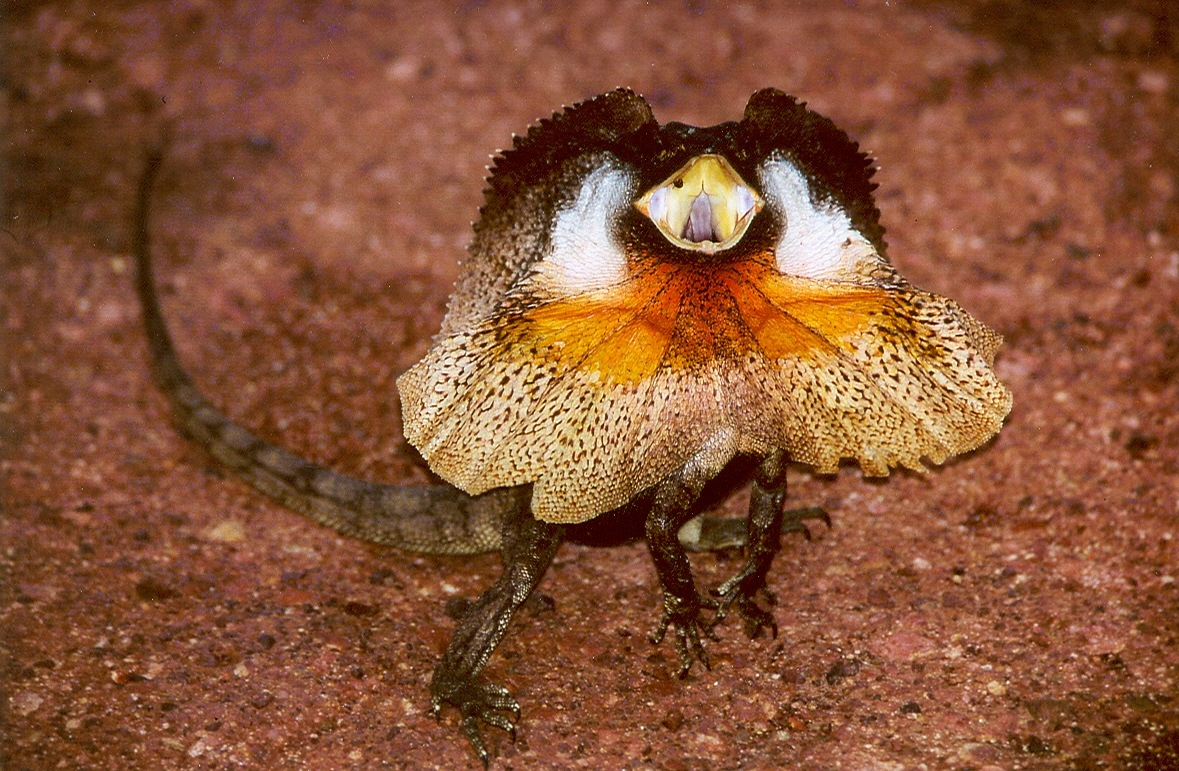
Frill-necked lizard faces predators, making itself look big with head frills, gaping, raising its body and waving its tail.

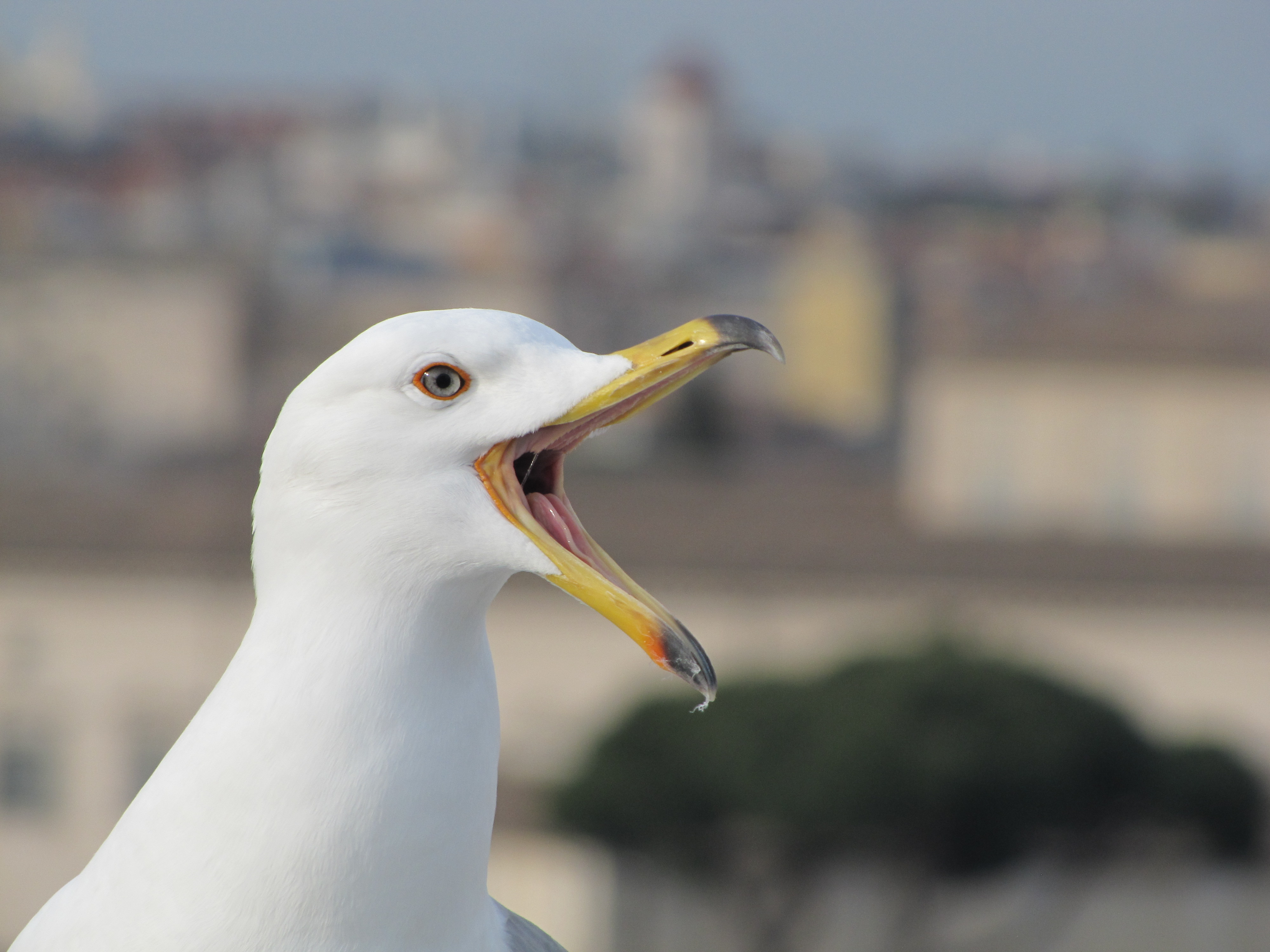
A gull's upper mandible can flex upwards because it is supported by small bones which can move slightly backwards and forwards.
