= Scarpa =

Scarpa is an Italian surname

It may refer to:

- Andrea Scarpa (born 1987), Italian boxer
- Antonio Scarpa (1752–1832), Italian anatomist and professor
- Carlo Scarpa (1906–1978), Italian architect
- Carola Scarpa (1971–2011), Brazilian actress and socialite
- Cagnaccio di San Pietro (1897–1946), born Natale Bentivoglio Scarpa, an Italian magic realist painter
- Daniele Scarpa (born 1964), Italian sprint canoer
- David Scarpa, American screenwriter
- Eugenia Scarpa (1886–1961), Italian composer and singer
- Fernando Scarpa, director and actor
- Francesco Scarpa (born 1979), Italian football player
- Gino Scarpa (1924–2022), Italian-born Norwegian painter, printmaker and sculptor, and mountaineer
- Gregory Scarpa Sr. (1928–1994), American capo and hitman for the Colombo crime family
- Gregory Scarpa Jr. (born 1951), American capo for the Colombo crime family and informant on international terrorists
- Gustavo Scarpa (born 1994), Brazilian footballer
- Lawrence Scarpa (born 1959), American architect
- Luke Joseph Scarpa (1928–2012), American professional wrestler better known as Chief Jay Strongbow
- Marc Scarpa (born 1969), American entrepreneur, producer and director
- Massimo Scarpa (born 1970), Italian golfer
- Pedro Luís Guido Scarpa (1925–2018), Angolan Roman Catholic bishop of Ndalatando, Angola
- Renato Scarpa (1939–2021), Italian film actor
- Rodrigo Scarpa, host of the Brazilian comedy television show broadcast Pânico na Band
- Romano Scarpa (1927–2005), Italian comics artist
- Roque Esteban Scarpa (1914–1995), Chilean writer, literary critic and scholar
- Tiziano Scarpa (born 1963), Italian novelist, playwright and poet

== See also ==
- Scarpa (company)
- Fascia of Scarpa
- Scarpa's ganglion
- Foramina of Scarpa
- Endolymph, also known as Scarpa's fluid
- Grivel Scarpa Binding
