= Harmen Abma =

Dutch painter

Harmen Abma (21 November 1937 in Hilaard – 30 November 2007 in Sneek) was a Frisian abstract and conceptual artist and painter. He was a member of an artistic group in the 1960s known as De Bende van de Blauwe Hand in Harlingen. He often experimented with materials as diverse as electric wire, concrete mesh, rope, jute and seat cushions in his artistic works, and contributed tile pictures to houses. In the 1970s and 1980s he heavily researched and produced work based on colour mixing, and exploring the mathematical dimensions of it such as ratio and surface. Today his works are on display at the Stedelijk Museum in Amsterdam, the Gemeentemuseum Den Haag, and the Fries Museum in Leeuwarden.
