= Sauze d'Oulx-Jouvencaux =

Winter sports venue in Turin, Italy

Sauze d'Oulx-Jouvenceaux is a venue located in Sauze d'Oulx, Italy. During the 2006 Winter Olympics, it hosted the freestyle skiing competitions.
