= C. R. Johnson =

American skier (1983-2010)

Personal information
- Nickname: C.R. Johnson
- Nationality: American
- Born: Charles Russell Johnson III; August 10, 1983 Truckee, Lake Tahoe California
- Died: February 24, 2010 (aged 26) Squaw Valley, California, U.S.
- Website: Official MySpace

Sport
- Sport: Freeskiing

Charles Russell Johnson III (August 10, 1983 – February 24, 2010) was a professional skier and a pioneer in the freeskiing movement. He became a top competitor and a favorite in ski films and was known for his progression, fearlessness, and passion for skiing. Johnson died in 2010 in a ski accident.

== Childhood ==
C.R. Johnson was born and raised in Truckee, Lake Tahoe California. He grew up skiing Squaw Valley Resort, a world-class ski area that is known for its extreme terrain. At Squaw Valley, Johnson spent his time lapping the terrain park and charging difficult chutes and bowls. Johnson quickly developed a large range of tricks and excellent big mountain skills. In addition to skiing, Johnson enjoyed surfing, fly-fishing, traveling, and spending time with close friends and family.

== Career ==
In 1999, Johnson emerged on the freeskiing scene when he successfully landed a 1440. The skiing community quickly recognized CR as a talented young star who could help progress free skiing. CR was a fearless skier willing to try any tricks and ski any backcountry lines. His passion for skiing and dedication to improve propelled him to become one of the best free skiers in the world. In 2001, CR placed first at the Core Games quarter pipe in Japan and podiumed at the Big Air Winter X Games in Mount Snow, Vermont. The following year at the 2002 Winter X Games, CR won silver in slopestyle. In addition to his medals, ESPN Action Sports nominated CR for Male Skier of the Year. In 2003, Johnson won bronze at Winter X Games Superpipe. If it was not for him crashing on the lip of the pipe, CR might have gotten Gold over Candide Thovex. Regardless of the results, CR exemplified the future of half-pipe skiing by launching 20 feet above the pipe’s walls and landing technical tricks with many spins and intricate grabs. During this period, CR also spent time filming and producing ski segments with action sport producers like Matchstick Productions, Poor Boyz Productions, and Teton Gravity Research. From 1999 until 2004, CR had a significant role in many ski films. Some of his most notable segments were in films called “Front Line,” “Focused,” and “WSK 106.”

== Injury ==
On December 8, 2005, Johnson was filming his latest movie, Show and Prove, when he suffered a life-threatening injury. He was skiing at Brighton Ski Resort in Utah on a powder day, when he and Kye Peterson, along with the snowboarders Zach Siebert & Tommi Ylianttila, launched off natural features under the Millicent chair, one after another. Johnson being the first one to descend stopped after landing an air to collect his gear, when Kye Peterson struck him right below his helmet. The impact knocked Johnson unconscious for about three minutes. When help arrived he was immediately sedated and flown to the University of Utah Hospital. There he was put into intensive care but his recovery was questionable. For 10 days, Johnson remained in a medically induced coma. However on December 18, 2005, Johnson opened his eyes halfway. Eight days later Johnson began whispering, eating, and moving both sides of his body. He was then moved out of the critical care unit to a neural rehabilitation unit, where he began speech, physical, and occupational therapy. After being hospitalized for 34 days, Johnson was finally able to return home.

== Comeback ==
Johnson was determined to start skiing again. He was not going to let his life-threatening injury prevent him from doing what he loved. In 2007, Johnson began the ski season with the attitude and mindset that he would return to his original form. That November and December he spent six weeks in Colorado training half-pipe. Unfortunately, Johnson had a hard time progressing and decided he was not strong enough to compete. He then spent time traveling to different competitions, heli-skiing in British Columbia, and filming with Matchstick Productions. At the end of the year, Johnson had overcome many mental hurdles and reestablished a new direction for his ski career. He decided to concentrate on filming and progressing his backcountry skiing. In 2008 and 2009, Johnson continued to travel and film with several ski production companies. He continued to improve and in 2010 Johnson placed third at the Red Bull Line Catcher event in France.

== Death ==
On February 24, 2010, at age 26, Johnson died skiing at Squaw Valley Ski Resort in the Light Towers area. He had chosen an extreme rocky line to go down the mountain and caught an edge on an exposed rock which caused him to fall. Medical assistance arrived several minutes after the incident and was pronounced dead in the hospital . His death had significant impact throughout the freeskiing, mountain sport, and especially in the Squaw Valley community which lost several high profile athletes near the end of the decade. A funeral service was held March 5, 2010.
