= Line Skis =

Ski company

- Type: Subsidiary of K2 Sports
- Industry: Skiing, Snowsports, Design
- Founded: Albany, New York, United States (1995)
- Headquarters: Seattle, Washington, United States
- Parent: K2 Sports (Kohlberg and Company, LLC)
- Website: www.lineskis.com

Line Skis, commonly shortened to Line or stylized as LINE, is a new school ski company owned by K2 Sports. Line Skis was founded by Jason Levinthal in 1995 to produce short, twin-tipped skis for freestyle skiers, and has since moved to produce full-length free skis.

The brand also sells items such as ski poles, streetwear, and various accessories.

Line Skis manufactures its stock in the same factory as K2 Skis.

Line Skis maintains a professional team featuring athletes like Eric Pollard (skier) Tom Wallisch, Leo Tailleffer, and Hadley Hammer. Many are featured in Line's online webisode series, the LINE Traveling Circus.

== History ==
=== Establishment ===
Line Skis was formed in a one-car garage, where the founder Jason Levinthal began manufacturing Line's skiboards. After visiting a trade show known as the SIA with some prototypes, Levinthal signed a contract with a Japanese distributor for his first order of 1000 pairs of skis. Line Skis then moved to a rented garage, where friends and family helped him fill the order.

In 1997, Line Skis filed the first patent for twin-tipped skis.

Line Skis had little U.S. market until the 1997 SIA, when the large company Salomon presented its own novelty ski boards, and sales improved.

The next season, Line signed five of its first athletes: Carter Griffin, Mike Nick, Reg Pare, Doug Levinthal, Mike Wilson, and Jason Levinthal himself. Line also introduced four new ski boards: the Mike Nick Pro Model, the Jedi 89, the Cruiser 89, and the Kicker 76.

In 1998, Line introduced a full-length pro model, "The Ostness Dragon", as well as a short, center mounted, symmetrical ski called the Twelve Sixty. K2 Skis had previously released the short, unwieldy K2 Poacher, and Salomon had produced the Salomon 1080.

=== Post-establishment ===
By this time, in 1999, Levinthal was producing 4,000 skis a year through various garages. Months later, Line Skis was acquired by the Canadian manufacturer Karhu, from Cowansville, Quebec, who began producing Line Skis; Karhu already produced Karhu skis and some Burton snowboards.

When Karhu was acquired by the larger K2 Sports in 2006, and Line Skis moved to Seattle, Jason Levinthal continued to direct the company from Burlington, Vermont.

In 2008, Andy Parry and Will Wesson joined the Line team. Together they established the LINE Traveling Circus, and finished filming their tenth season in 2018.

In 2013, Jason Levinthal left his top position at Line Skis in order to start a new, direct-to-consumer company known as J Skis. He was succeeded by former intern Josh Malczyk.

== Sale of company ==
In 2003, Jason Levinthal sold Line Skis to Trak Sports USA. Line Skis then moved from Levinthal's garage in Albany, NY, to a shared complex in Burlington, VT with Karhu USA, another one of Trak Sports' ski company subsidiaries.

Later, in 2006, Trak Sports USA sold Line Skis and Karhu USA to K2 Sports, thus combining K2's manufacturing connections with Line's ski development. Line Skis moved production from their original factory in China, to the same Chinese factory as K2 Skis. Although Line's skis are outsourced to China, the design and prototyping is conducted in Washington.

Following the acquisition, Tim Petrick, vice president of global sales for K2 Sports, announced: "[Line Skis, Karhu USA, and K2 are] different brands with different distribution strategies, and distinct pricing structures backed by a reliable supply chain, management, warranty protection, and solid production facilities."

Line Skis and Karhu subsequently moved to K2 Sports' headquarters in Seattle, WA, although they retained several of their Burlington employees; namely, the directors, graphic designers, and engineers.

K2 Sports itself was acquired by Jarden Corp. in 2007 for $1.2 billion. Then, in 2016, Newell Rubbermaid acquired Jarden Corp. as they merged into Newell Brands, Inc. The resulting $16 billion consumer goods company shortly began to offload the winter sports businesses Jarden had acquired in 2007, which included Line's parent K2 Sports. For ten months, Line Skis was in danger of closure; Michael Polk, CEO of Newell Brands, told investors in September 2016 that if they were unable to find a buyer for their winter brands by June 2017, K2 Sports would face closure. However, some consumers argue that there was little chance of this, due to the quality reputations of K2 and its subsidiaries.

In late May 2017, Kohlberg & Company, LLC agreed to purchase K2 Sports (excluding Marmot) from Newell Brands for $240 million. The vice president of K2 Sports expressed his excitement at the sale, saying: "it's the first time in a long time that we've had ownership that has been 100% excited about the opportunity of the winter sports business."

As of July 2018, Line Skis continues to serve as a subdivision of K2 Sports beneath its parent business, Kohlberg & Company, LLC.

== Eric Pollard ==
Eric Pollard is an artist, designer, and professional skier for Line Skis. Line has sponsored Pollard since 1997. Eric Pollard works directly with Line's engineers to develop his pro models; his first recorded personal project, and second pro model, was the LINE Elizabeth in 2005. Since 2003, the partnership between Pollard and Line Skis has produced ten pro models, each with topsheets and bases designed yearly by Pollard himself.

As of the 2018-2019 season, his signature collection comprises the LINE Pescado, Sakana, Magnum Opus, Mordecai, Sir Francis Bacon, and Sir Francis Bacon Shorty. He also has a pro model pole: Pollard's Paintbrush.

Eric Pollard is artistically involved with Line, and has previously gone beyond ski topsheets and graphics to contribute to the brand's streetwear as well. Line's engineers concur that Pollard "epitomizes our ethos of going down the mountain in a different way, of looking at the hill with a new perspective."

== Tom Wallisch ==
Signed with Line Skis on November 3, 2014. Tom Wallisch (born July 22, 1987, in Pittsburgh, Pennsylvania) is a professional freeskier. He began skiing in 1990 and competing in the sport in 2009. After graduating from high school, Wallisch moved to Salt Lake City for post-secondary education at the University of Utah where he is pursuing a degree in the school of business.

== Line Traveling Circus ==
To contrast to the high budget ski films and online webisodes, Line created the Traveling Circus to document pro skiers adventures in an average person’s playground. High School friends and professional skiers Will Wesson and Andy Parry first approached Levinthal with the idea of traveling around and skiing after they graduated from college, and filmed a pilot episode at Mt. Hood, Oregon.

The series centers on the new school skiing and non-snow adventures of Wesson and Parry, with many guest stars throughout. The series epitomizes the ultimate quest for snow that is a ski bum's lifestyle. Many of the locations filmed are low profile resorts, especially from the East Coast.

In season 3, episode 2, the Traveling Circus acquired the now famous yellow TC van, which is still in use. Also in season 3, the TC expanded their boundaries outside of North America by venturing to Europe for the first time in episode 4. Season 5 again expanded the boundaries with Will, Andy and friends going to New Zealand (Episode 5.2 "Lord of the Pies") and then to Japan to explore the bottomless powder (Episode 5.5 "The Last Skiurai"). Released as roughly monthly webisodes online in 2008, the series has had 18 seasons to date.

After episode 8.1, principal cinematographer Shane McFalls retired. Jake Strassman now films and edits the series.

== Notable skis ==
=== 1260 ===
The 1260 was the first one hundred percent symmetrically shaped ski. This meant that it was the same forwards as it was backwards. It was a freestyle machine made for spinning and landing backwards. The equal height tip and tail also aided in the reverse landings and carving. Equal height tip and tail means that the tails are exactly the same height off the ground as the traditionally upturned tips. The twelve sixties also featured symmetrical flex which is equal flex in front of and behind the boot. This allowed the ski to bend and pop back into shape for easier popping and carving. The 1260s name refers to a 1260 degree rotation (3.5 spins).

=== The 130 ===
In 2001, Line Skis and Eric Pollard got together to talk powder. They wanted a powder ski that broke away from traditional powder ski design. Most powder skis were only 105 mm underfoot at the time. The 130 was 130 mm underfoot. This made it one of the widest skis available. Pollard and Line designed the 130 to also be useful on not only deep powder, but on groomers and in the trees as well.

=== Invader ===
The Invader showcased a new concept that inspired a new way of riding in and out of the park. The Invader's progressive "Butter Zone" construction featured a thinner ski in front and behind the boot that allowed the rider to lean forwards or backwards to playfully "butter" around in most any condition. Buttering is the act of spinning around on ones tips or tails, picture butter being spread on toast. The ski tips or tails act as a slippery pivot point. Buttering opened up a new world of technical tricks. People began buttering off of jumps and onto rails and even using the technique to continue tricks after they landed them, a similar concept of reverting on a skateboard.

=== EP Pro ===
Eric Pollard was happy with the creation of The 130 and it became his implicit pro model. Not until 2007 did Pollard get a ski named after him. The EP Pro is a cornucopia of innovative features. First, they have Early Rise. Early Rise is describing the way the camber of the ski is reversed near the tip and tail. The skis have conventional upturned tips, but they are made higher off the snow by the actual flex of the ski being turned up gradually as it goes from binding to tip. This makes skiing forwards and backwards in deeper snow much easier to control. Another aspect of the EP Pro that helps the skiers control in the powder is the Early Taper. Traditional ski designs make the widest part of the ski at the tip, making it the last part of the ski to touch the snow before it upturns to the tip. Early Taper brings the fattest part of the ski back toward the boot and away from the tip. This gives more control and quick response from the ski in the deep powder, making turns more creative and free, rather than relying on the harsh curve of the side-cut to whip you into a turn.

=== Chronic Cryptonite ===
This ski was first introduced in 2010. It was notable for its firm powerful flex pattern, a 92 mm waist and its g-cut geometry. There is reverse camber to promote reliable handling on groomed terrain, and it has a fatty base/edge for skiing in fresh snow. This ski provides uncompromised versatility, stability and control. This ski is innovative in the Line collection for being an all mountain ski; it provides great usage when skiing in both the park (freestyle terrain), and all over the rest of the mountain—anywhere from groomed trails to fresh snow.

=== Afterbang ===
This ski was first ever constructed like a skateboard. Since the act of skiing has changed from simply skiing down a hill to grinding metal railing (urban skiing) the market demanded a ski to hold up stronger than the current construction.

=== Sick Day Series ===
A new directional freeride ski with a lightweight core and geometry the yields ease of use on any terrain. There are 3 models in the series which differing waist widths of 95, 110 and 125 millimeters underfoot to accommodate different terrain.

=== Supernatural Series ===
The Supernatural series is based on its predecessor, the Prophet series. The Supernatural series uses a few unique features to achieve a solid all-mountain ski fit for terrain from groomers to bumps to powder. The sidewall construction allows for better shock absorbing ability, while the Metal Matrix used within the Maple Macroblock core gives the skis rigidity resulting in a smooth and stable ride at speed.
