= K2 Sports =

American sporting goods company

Coordinates: 47.564025°N 122.327487°W

K2
- Type: Private
- Industry: Sporting goods
- Founded: 1962; 64 years ago
- Founder: Bill Kirschner; Don Kirschner
- Headquarters: Seattle, Washington, U.S.
- Area served: Worldwide
- Key people: Josee Larocque (CEO)
- Products: Skis, Snowboards, Ski Boots, Ski Bindings, Snowboard Boots, Snowboard bindings, Apparel, Inline skates, Ice skates, Snowshoes, Backcountry Safety Accessories
- Brands: K2 Skis, K2 Snowboards, K2 Skates, Backcountry Access, Ride Snowboards, Tubbs Snowshoes, Atlas Snow-Shoe Company, LINE Skis, Full Tilt Boots, Madshus
- Parent: Kohlberg & Company
- Website: k2snow.com k2skates.com

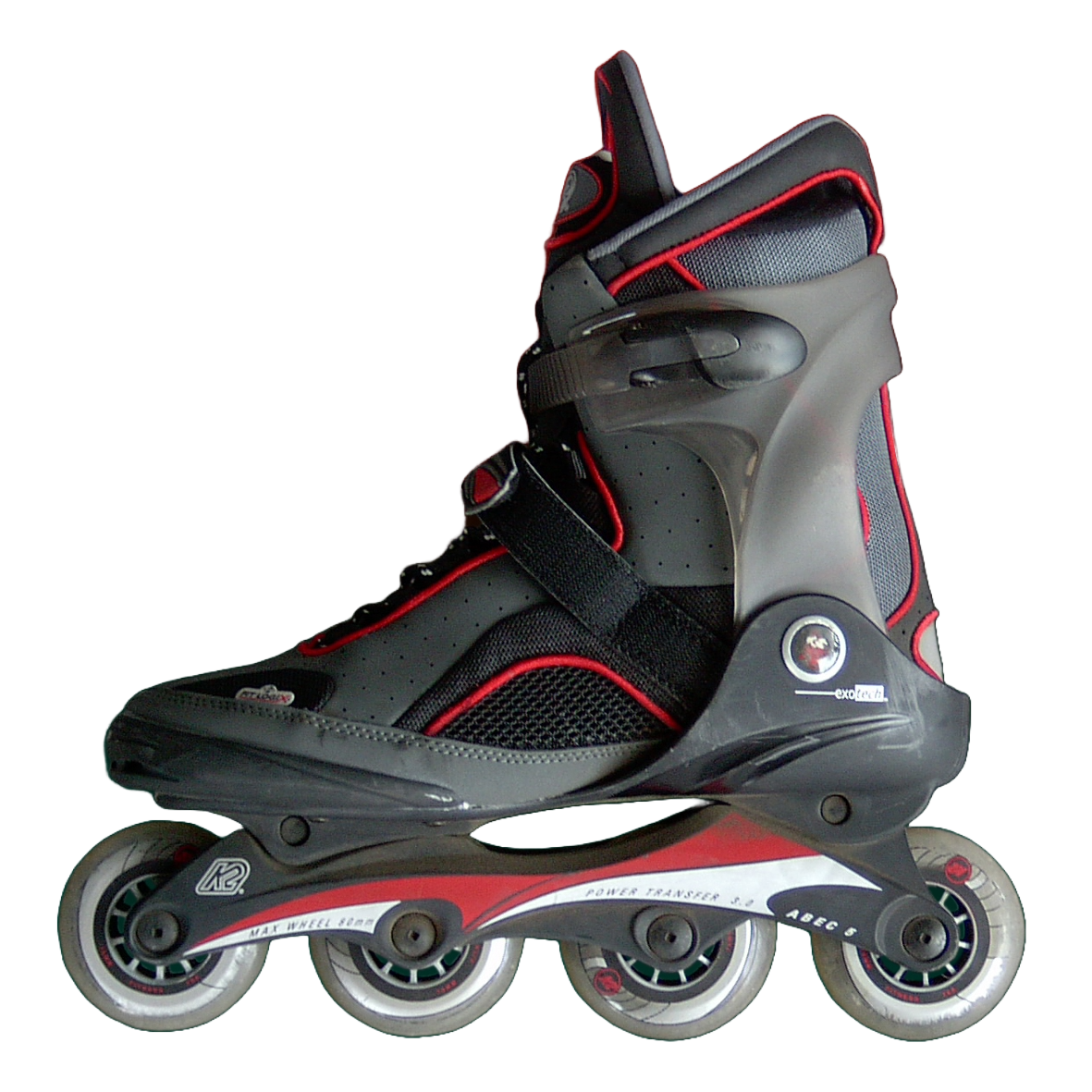
K2 inline skate (c.2004)

K2 Sports, LLC, known simply as K2, is an American sporting goods company headquartered in Seattle, Washington, focused primarily on winter sports equipment. K2 operates under the labels K2 Snow and K2 Skates, as well as its subsidiaries Backcountry Access, Ride Snowboards, Tubbs Snowshoes, Atlas Snow-Shoe Company, LINE Skis, Full Tilt Boots, and Madshus brands. Famous users of K2 Skis include pro champion Spider Sabich, World Cup and Olympic champion Phil Mahre, and his twin brother Steve Mahre, World Champion and Olympic silver medalist.

== History ==
=== Founding ===
Founded in 1962 by brothers Bill and Don Kirschner on Vashon Island, Washington, K2 is known for pioneering fiberglass ski technology, which made skis significantly lighter and more lively than their wood and metal contemporaries. In 1967, Bill Kirschner named the company K2 for the world's second-highest mountain and for the two Kirschner brothers, Bill and Don.

=== Growth and acquisitions ===
In late 1969, the company's rapid growth required new capital and Bill Kirschner decided a well-financed partner was necessary. The company was acquired by the Cummins Engine Company of Columbus, Indiana. Then in November 1976, the company was acquired by a private group of Northwest investors. The group, called Sitca, purchased K2 and its subsidiary, Jansport.

In 1982, company management purchased all outstanding shares of Sitca Corporation from the group of Northwest investors. Management decided to concentrate all resources on the alpine ski market.

In September 1985, Anthony Industries, Inc. acquired 100 percent of the stock of Sitca Corporation. Anthony, an NYSE listed company, develops and manufactures products for leisure and recreational markets under many brand names.

In 1995, Anthony Industries sold off its Anthony Pools division to its rival, Sylvan Pools, and changed its name to K2, Inc. By 2000, board member Richard Heckmann had assumed control and embarked on a vigorous growth program. In order to remain financially competitive, K2 moved its manufacturing from Vashon Island to Guangdong, China in 2001.

Thereafter, the company acquired Rawlings Sporting Goods and Worth, a manufacturer of baseball bats; Brass Eagle and Viewloader in the paintball business; Völkl, Marker, and Marmot. On June 22, 2006, K2 announced it was moving its business office from Vashon Island to Seattle's Industrial District.

On April 25, 2007 Jarden Corporation announced a definitive agreement to acquire K2, Inc. for a cash and stock value per share of $15.50. Jarden is controlled by Martin Franklin, a British investor and triathlete. Jarden was later acquired by Newell Brands, who then sold K2 to private equity firm Kohlberg & Company in 2017.
