= Rosemount Ski Boots =

Plastic ski boots

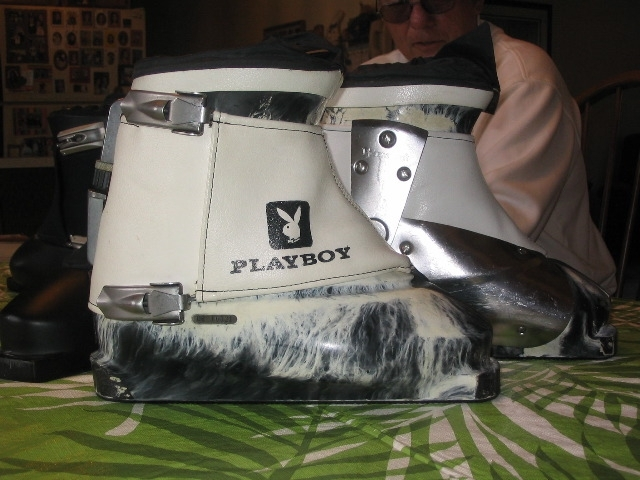
- Rosemount produced these Playboy-branded "Bunny Boots" in the early 1970s when Playboy operated several ski resorts. The large metal plate supporting the hinge and covering the opening in the side of the boot can be seen on the far boot. The near boot has the cover closed. The lower cable has slipped out of the notch that tries to keep it in place. The forward-lean control of the Fastback series can be seen at the back of the boot.
- Type: Ski boot
- Material: plastic
- Manufacturer: Raichle
- Introduced: 1965/66

Rosemount Ski Boots introduced one of the earliest all-plastic ski boots for the downhill skiing market, competing with Bob Lange for the title of "first". Rosemount's design was easily distinguished by its use of the uncommon "side-entry" method for putting the boot on, which was rare at the time and is no longer used.

The boot was introduced by Rosemount Engineering, better known for their aerospace instrumentation. They referred to the boot division as either the Rosemount Consumer Products Division or Sports Technology.

Rosemount sold the factory to Bass Sports in 1968, but the boots retained the Rosemount name throughout their production. Many variations of the design were introduced over the next four years, and Bass added ski bindings and ski poles as well. The rest of Rosemount became Rosemount Inc. when they were purchased by Emerson in 1976.

Bass Sports was in turn purchased by Raichle in 1972, who ended production of the Rosemount boot in favor of their own designs the next year. Ironically, one of the few other side-entry boot designs was the Raichle Fibre Jet (aka Red and Red Hot), another fiberglass design which was no longer in production.

== History ==
=== Leather boots ===
Downhill skiing evolved as a specialization of a previously generic skiing sport. Before the era of ski lifts, skiing always involved cross-country portions, and the downhills tended to be short, slow, and had to be skied back up.

Equipment during this era was designed for the cross-country portions. This normally consisted of a wooden ski, a leather winter boot, and a cable binding to keep the two together. This combination of equipment was far from optimal for downhill skiing. During the downhill portions the skis are turned by rotating them onto their edges; in traditional cable bindings, the heel is free to lift from the ski to allow a striding motion, and the system offers little support for edging.

The introduction of ski lifts, especially after World War II, led to the specialization of downhill as a separate sport, and new equipment evolved to meet this market. One example was the "Kandahar" style cable bindings, which added small metal hooks near the heel. When the cable was passed under the clips it was locked in place and offered much better edging control. By the mid-1950s these were joined by a number of new binding systems that allowed the toe of the boot to release during fall.

The style of skiing allowed by the new bindings demanded new boots that were much stiffer as well, and a number of designs that were boiled in oil or soaked in glue became common in the 1950s. They were initially so rigid to be extremely uncomfortable, but softened up after a break-in period. The comfortable period was quite short, as the breaking-in (or down) process would continue until it became too soft to offer good control. A typical pair might last a single season – or only weeks for racers. The leather was far from ideal in other ways as well; it would soak up water or snow and then freeze, making them very difficult to get on or off while also offering little warmth.

=== Rosemount Engineering ===
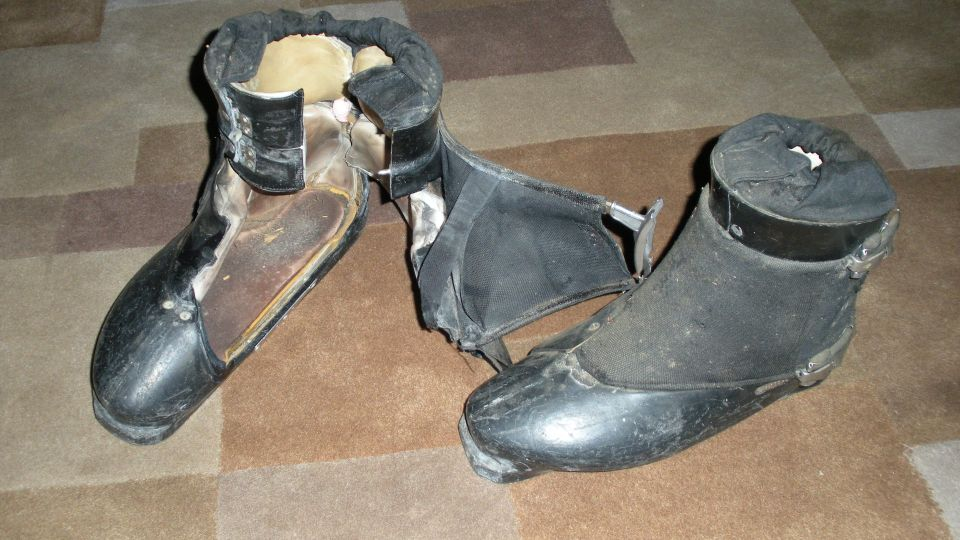
Rosemount ski boots, c. 1968. The boot on the left is open; it closes by pulling the flap across the front of the boot and locking small metal tabs into buckles. The buckles are visible on the closed boot, on the extreme right. The large metal hinges are not visible on either boot, it is under the fabric on the right, and behind the open flap on the left.

A number of experiments with composite designs were carried out by a variety of inventors through the 1950s, but all faced what appeared to be a catch-22; a boot stiff enough side-to-side to offer good edge control was too stiff front-to-back to allow the natural flexing motion of the leg that occurs during turns or on bumps. Early examples using plastics or fibreglass invariably proved far too rigid to be skied.

Frank Werner, president of Rosemount Engineering, had taken up skiing in the late 1950s when downhill was first becoming a major sport. He took it upon himself to develop a new boot that offered the perfect mix of sideways rigidity and forward flex, handing these twin demands to his engineering staff.

They responded with a simple solution that is now universal; the boot is made of two separate pieces, a shoe covering the foot and heel, and a separate section that forms a cuff around the lower leg. The two pieces are joined together with a hinge near the ankle. Their design was unique in the details of its construction; in modern designs the upper and lower portions of the boot overlap in front of the ankle, in the Rosemount design the two were entirely separate and held together with large stainless steel plates. The forward flex was entirely unconstrained, as the two halves did not rub over each other. As long as the hinge was mechanically strong enough, it would provide unlimited lateral stiffness.

Rosemount's chosen material was fiberglass reinforced epoxy. This was mechanically strong, lightweight, weatherproof, and could be easily formed into any required shape. It was strong enough that the metal hinges could be riveted directly to it. However, fibreglass thick enough to bear these loads would be essentially rigid, and could not be opened or closed by conventional means – splitting it along the top of the boot and pulling it closed with laces. This was a concern, as a fibreglass cuff that fit the lower leg tightly enough for control would not allow the larger sections of the foot and heel to pass through it when putting it on.

Rosemount's solution was to build the boot in two halves, one covering the majority of the foot and leg, and a smaller section that hinged along the footbed, rotating out to the side. To put the boot on, the moving section was rotated out, allowing the skier's foot to be inserted through the opened side of the boot. The moving section was then rotated up, back into place, and held there by two buckles, one on the foot and one on the leg cuff. The seam was then sealed from the snow with an elastic material that was stretched over the front of the boot.

Forward flex was controlled by three neoprene bands connected to the cuff through a strap running up the back of the boot. The bands were located under the removable sole liner, and could be replaced to change the stiffness. For comfort and fit, the boot was customized by inserting a series of small leather pads in a variety of sizes. The pillows contained one or more plastic bags filled with tiny plastic beads. The bags could be hand-moulded into the required shape, and natural movement of the foot would keep them in the approximate shape needed for comfort. Initial setup was time consuming, and presented a problem in the ski shops.

Rosemount's first production run of 900 prototype boots was sent to the ski shops in 1965/66. By this point, Bob Lange had already shipped a number of boots made of "Royalite" ABS plastic; these were not very successful, but do they pre-date the Rosemount examples as the earliest plastic boots.

=== Improvements ===
The boot design quickly proved to have a number of problems. The most serious was that seam between the two halves of the boot could not be easily sealed, and water and snow could be forced into the boots through the hinge or the seam where the two halves met in front or behind it.

This led to a modification for the 1966/67 season, moving the hinge from the bottom of the foot to the back of the leg, allowing the moving flap to rotate back instead of to the side. The buckles and fabric flap were combined into one system, a larger piece of fabric that wrapped the entire front of the boot and buckled closed at the back of the boot. Two cables, one each at the top and bottom of the flap, fit into grooves on the front of the boot to keep the flap from sliding around.

A separate piece of elastic fabric was added at the top of the leg cuff, sealing it around the leg and preventing snow from entering on the top. Separate pieces of neoprene could be inserted between the cuff and foot in order to adjust the forward flex pattern of the boot, and the hinges could be adjusted to modify the "cant", the lateral angle between the foot and leg.

However, even the small amount of flexing that did occur in the shell allowed the joint along the side of the foot to open slightly. The section of the joint along the bottom of the boot, just above the ski where the hinge used to be, was not covered by the fabric flap. A clip was supposed to keep this closed, but was considered to be useless. During turns, snow could be jammed up against the joint and would melt inside the boot; wet feet were a common problem.

=== Bass Sports ===
By 1968, the company had sold their factory to the G. H. Bass shoe company in Maine. Its original owner, George Henry Bass, had been producing conventional leather boots since the 1940s. Now run by his son, Robert "Bunny" Bass, an avid skier and one of the founders of the Sugarloaf ski resort in Maine. Bass kept the Rosemount brand and continued to improve the design.

A further modification followed for the 1969 season, enlarging the metal hinge on the medial side (inside) until it covered most of that side of the boot. The larger plate was designed to clip into a metal flange running along the side of the boot just below the opening. Closing the boot was a two-step operation, the flap was swung closed and then the metal plate was pushed downward until it clipped into the flange. Judging by contemporary reports, this appears to have solved the leakage problem.

Another change, on some models, was the introduction of a separate adjustment for the natural forward lean of the boot. In earlier models this was set through shoe laces on the front of the cuff, in the new "Fastback" models, a screw jack on the back of the boot allowed lean adjustment at any time.

=== Other products ===
Bass Sports also introduced a number of other products under the Rosemount name. These included a series of fibreglass ski poles, which were relatively new at the time, and a new ski binding design.

Ski bindings evolved from the cable binding system of the 1950s, which looped around behind the boot and over the back of the sole. Many boots of the 1950s and 60s included a semi-circular indentation in the sole to provide a better fit for the cable. Early releasing bindings were designed to fit into this groove or over the sole, like a cable, often using a metal roller about the same size as the cable, the Look Nevada's "Gran Prix" release heel being a typical example. When plastic boots were introduced, they too provided similar sole extensions for mounting the bindings.

However, as there was no standardization of boot sole shapes, designing a binding that worked with any boot was difficult. Worse, on leather boots the mounting point would change as the leather wore down, or even due to flexing during the day. One solution to this problem was to use small metal fittings screwed into the boot, to provide a known and unchanging mounting point for the bindings. Solutions like these were features of some of the first so-called safety bindings, the Miller and Cubco, while popular "plate binding" designs of the 1970s used metal plates that extended along the entire sole of the boot. The bindings clipped onto these plates instead of the boot proper, providing a much more reliable release.

Rosemount's solution was something of a blending of these designs. The hard sole of the boot served as the plate, with small metal clips moulded into the toe and heel flanges to provide an attachment point for their bindings. The attachment points were customized for their own SE-1 toe and SE-2 heel, but their position left the flanges free to be used with any conventional binding of the era, even cables. Mechanically, the SE-1 and SE-2 looked and operated like the contemporary designs from Cubco and Gertsch.

Advertising for the bindings appeared in 1970, and Rosemount boots featured the metal clips that year. However, later designs from 1972 lack the clips and no further advertising can be found.

Along with the bindings, the Rosemount LOTORK system was introduced in 1970. This consisted of a metal plate that was affixed with adhesive to the top of the ski under the foot. The plate had bearings inside that allowed it to rotate to the sides. It had been found that friction between the ski and ski boot was much higher than imagined, enough to prevent the toe piece from releasing under certain conditions. The LOTORK was a solution to this, allowing easy rotation under any conditions. Similar products from other companies typically used teflon pads in place of the rotating mechanism.

=== End of the Line ===
In 1968 Bass purchased Rosemount, it picked up distribution rights to some European brands, including Hexcel skis, Raichle boots, Splitkein cross country skis, and a skiwear line. The ski-related companies were organized as Bass Sports, or Sports Technology, separate from the shoe company. In 1972 Raichle set up its own North American distribution company, Raichle-Molitor USA, under the leadership of Heinz Herzog. At that time, "Bunny" Bass retired and was succeeded by sales manager Butch Wieden. The Rosemount brand was retired, too.

== See also ==
- Rosemount Inc.
