= Raichle Flexon =

Downhill ski boot

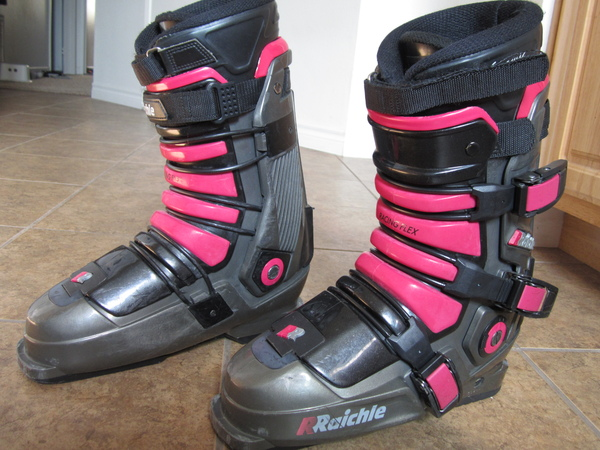
A pair of late-model Flexon Comp ski boots. The cable closures are designed to hold the flex plate (black and pink) firmly against the front of the boot. The plate can be changed to modify the forward flex.

The Flexon is a downhill ski boot introduced by Raichle in the winter of 1980/81. Based on designs by Sven Coomer, Al Gross and Erik Giese, the Flexon used a unique system to control forward flex in a predictable way, as well as making the boot more comfortable and easier to put on and remove. The basic layout is referred to as a three-piece design; three-piece boots preceding the Flexon included the Henke Strato, Nordica Comp 3 and a dozen other designs from Italian bootmakers.

The Flexon was a major success on the pro circuit in the 1980s and 90s, especially among freestyle and mogul skiers looking for better performance and less shin bruising. A series of business mis-steps led to Raichle's demise in 1999, and the Flexon along with it. It remained so popular that the Flexon lived on through a vibrant aftermarket network and online auctions, notably the large collection maintained by free skier Seth Morrison.

K2 Sports purchased the original Flexon moulds, these have since been released under the new Full Tilt brand. Roxa, the Italian boot maker who produces Flexon for K2, also sells the boot under their own name. Numerous companies are now producing three-piece designs.

== History ==
=== Before Flexon ===
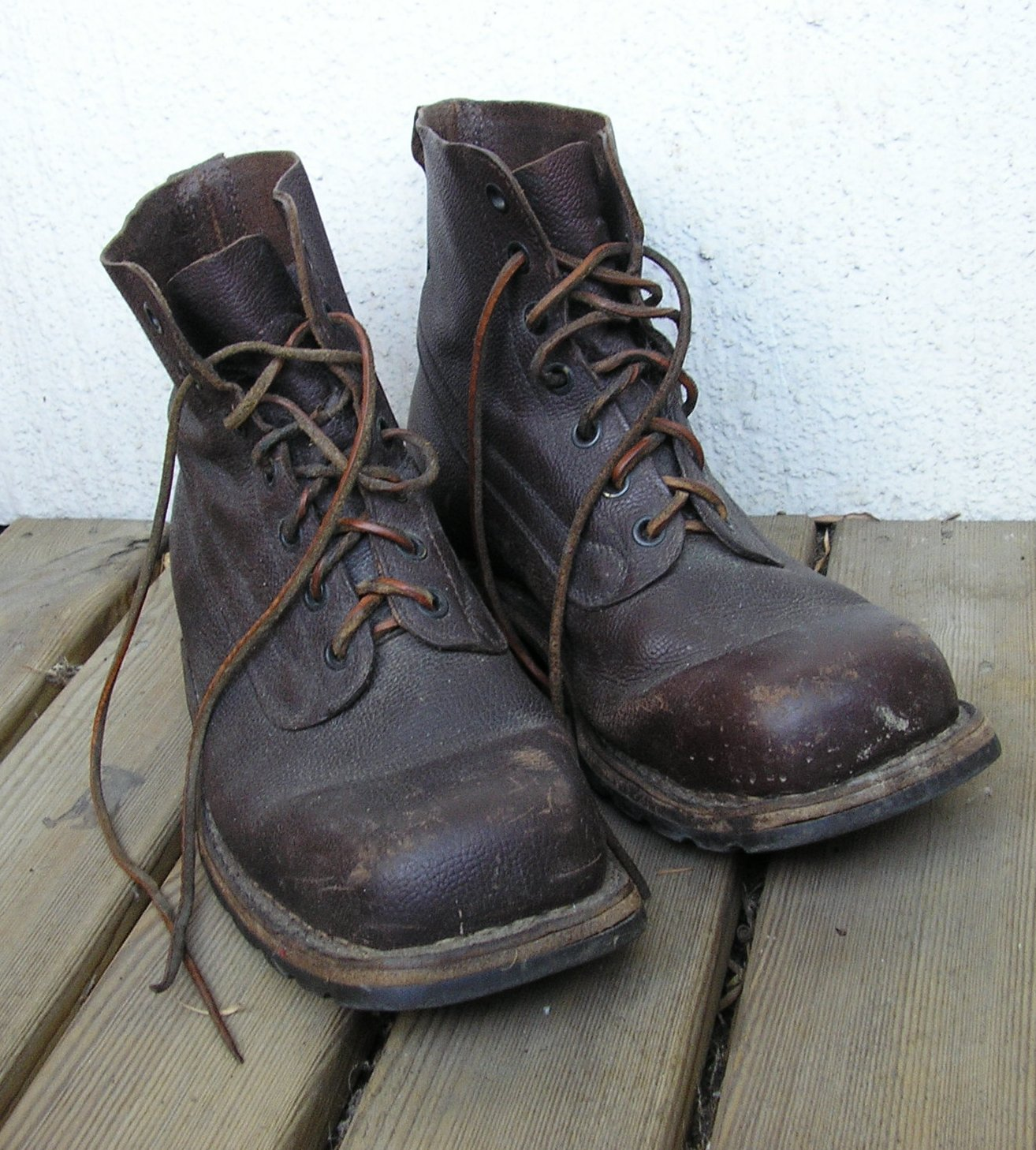
Traditional boots use a piece of leather (or two in this case) stitched to the sole.

Today's plastic ski boots evolved from leather designs that in turn evolved from conventional winter hiking boots. These all followed the same basic layout; the boot was built on top of a semi-stiff sole of leather or (for a stiffer boot) wood. The upper shell consisted of single layer or multiple layers of leather and stiffeners that were formed around a foot-like wooden block, the "last". Some models were designed with a single piece of leather wrapped over the toe area of the last, with the two sides of the leather meeting at the back of the heel, where they were stitched together. The designs normally left a slot-like opening and overlapping flaps running from the instep and up in front of the ankle. Laces threaded across the split section allow the boot to be tightened over the foot, and a tongue below the split sealed it to prevent water or snow entering.

Following the commercial introduction of the Kandahar binding in 1933, cable binding alpine racers were able to fasten the heel of the boot solidly to the top of the ski. They asked for heavier, stiffer boots to improve edge control. By the 1950s, boots had grown stiff enough that lacing was an onerous chore. In 1955, the Swiss firm Henke introduced the Speedfit boot, closed with overcenter buckles invented by the pilot Hans Martin. In 1971, Henke introduced several three-piece plastic designs which suffered structural failures due to the choice of an insufficiently strong plastic material.

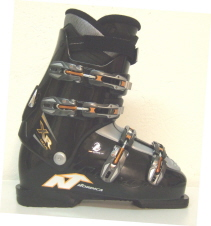
The conventional "front-entry" plastic ski boot is so stiff that it needs to open along the entire front, not just the calf area. Metal buckles are needed to provide the leverage needed to close them.

When the first attempts were made to replace leather with modern materials it was found that early plastics simple had too little flex to allow the boot to be built in the same manner. Generally the shells would be so stiff that they could not be opened sideways along the tongue, making it very difficult to enter the boot. New plastics introduced in the 1960s offered the required amount of flexibility to get into them, but when buckled closed they offered almost no forward flex. This made walking very awkward, reduced the feel of the ski on the snow, and made the impacts between the boot and calf painful. Bob Lange solved this problem by splitting the boot into two parts, one over the foot with an overlap closure to seal out snow, and another for the lower leg. These were joined with rivets at the ankles to allow the upper cuff to rotate forward. At the same time, Henke's first plastic boots used a three-piece shell, with an open tub for the foot, a hinged cuff, and an external "shell-tongue" to close and seal the lower section.

With the introduction, between 1969 and 1972, of the Nordica Astral and Grand Prix designs, these "front-entry" style boots achieved their modern form, with a removable innerboot that could be customized for precise and comfortable fit. Martin-style buckles provided the force necessary to close the stiff plastic shells. New buckle designs and other adjustments have been added, but today's overlap race boots look remarkably like the original Nordica Grand Prix. In 1976 Nordica introduced its own series of three-piece designs.

=== Lange-bang ===
In the traditional front-entry boot design, forward flex is resisted by the friction of the lower section of the leg cuff moving over the vertically extended top of the foot section, which rises above the ankle. This sliding movement can occur until the upper cuff reaches the flat part of the foot area, where further flex requires the plastic to press down on the skier's foot. Shaping the two parts offers some control over the flex pattern. Some designs have a lip moulded into the foot section that controls this stopping point.

Generally the resistance to forward motion is roughly linear until it suddenly stops, or the foot section deforms sideways. When travelling over small bumps, full force is immediately applied to the shin, at the point where the cuff meets the calf at the top of the boot. This can lead to bruising known as "Lange-bang" or "boot bite". When the force is released, friction tends to hold the boot in that position, requiring further force to return it to its neutral position.

=== Sven Coomer and Erik Giese ===
Sven Coomer is an Australian athlete and ski coach who came to the United States in the 1960s and began working for the American importer of Nordica boots. He was instrumental in developing Nordica's Astral, Grand Prix and Comp 3 designs.

After leaving Nordica, in the late '70s he modified a Nordica Meteor shell to use a springy nylon flex-controlling internal shell-tongue. He brought the design to Erik Giese in Aspen. Giese, an ex-ski racer and lawyer from Seattle, had founded a small research-and-design company in 1973, called Comfort Products. He employed two former NASA space-suit engineers: Al Gross, who was instrumental in developing the Flexon bellows tongue based on space suit components, and Dixie Rinehart, who designed articulated gloves later licensed to Swany.

Coomer arranged prototyping in Italy, and recommended the design to Raichle product manager Hanspeter Rohr, a former Swiss ski team member and former speed coach for the U.S. Ski Team. Meanwhile, Giese, Gross and Rinehart built a polished prototype with an external shell-tongue, and this became the Flexon.

The Flexon's spring tongue had two advantages; the application of force was progressive, and the boot returned to its neutral position when the force was released in a smoothly controlled or "dampened" manner (this characteristic would endear the boot to downhill racers, who didn't want to be surprised by a lively return when encountering bumps). The key was to ensure that the flexing force remained under control even with extreme bending. The result was a smooth flex that started off soft and progressively stiffened, which also eliminated Lange-bang.

The flex tongue is placed on the outside of the boot in front of the leg and over the foot. This is in addition to the internal padded tongue. This meant that the split between the right and left halves of the boot did not require the overlapping flaps of the conventional design that keep out the snow; in the Flexon, the flex plate served this purpose. With the overlapping flaps removed, in theory the boot was easier to put on and take off, as the lower shell was open to the sky once the buckles were released and the flex plate folded forward. However, the edges of the lower shell's opening were sharp and skiers learned to live with shell bite on the instep, at least in the early years of the Flexon's evolution.

Another advantage of the design, largely a side-effect as opposed to design feature, is the location of the buckles. In a conventional front-entry design, there are two independent sections of the boot that need to be closed. Normally each section has two buckles, producing the classic four-buckle boot with two buckles over the foot and two on the leg cuff. The Flexon provides one buckle each on the foot and lower leg, and a third over the ankle. When tightened, this third buckle pulls the flex tongue and foot rearward, helping to stabilize the heel in the rear pocket of the boot.

=== Flexon ===
In 1978/79, Giese prepared a prototype of the design, and showed it to the US distributor of Raichle boots, headed by Heinz Herzog. Seeing the potential of the design, they sent him to Raichle's headquarters in Switzerland. Raichle already produced a series of ski boots that were copies of Nordica models, and during the early 1980s they were facing competition from an explosion of new styles like rear-entry. Raichle had nothing in development that could match their competitors.

The company was initially skeptical, but when Giese demonstrated the distortion of a conventional boot when it flexed forward, they decided to start development of a full prototype, the Flexon Concept. The Concept was a success, and after being renamed the Flexon 5 it was released to the market for the winter of 1980/81. It was an early hit among freestyle skiers (then still known as "hot doggers") where the forgiving flex was a major advantage.

When Bill Johnson won downhill gold at the 1984 Winter Olympics on the Flexon Comp, the boot became a major force in the high-end market. Other Flexon users of the era included Nelson Carmichael. The boot consistently received excellent reviews, although complaints about the complex buckle system were nearly universal.

=== Success and failure ===
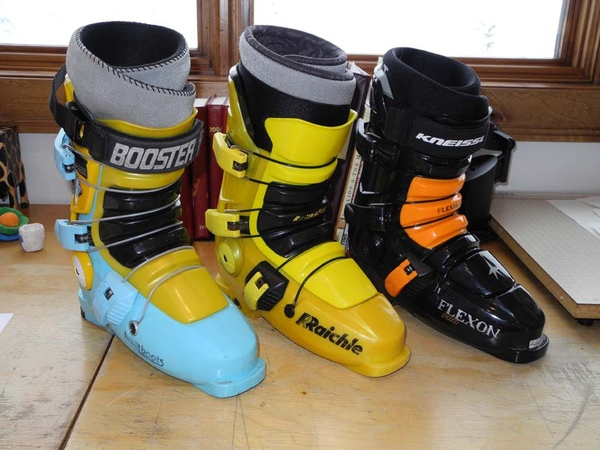
Three generations of Flexon. In the center is the original design, on the right is an example from the Kneissl years, and on the left the re-released Full Tilt versions. All three of these have custom replacement liners.

In 1983, the company was sold to Peter Werhan, grandson of Konrad Adenauer, the chancellor of Germany. Werhan was an avid skier, and saw the purchase as an opportunity to mix work and play. During the 1980s, sales of the Flexon line grew dramatically. Even a newly opened factory was hard pressed to keep up with demand, which reached 400,000 pairs a year.

In the late 1980s, Werhan fell asleep while driving and was killed. Werhan's wife Beatris took over, but by 1996, the business was on the verge of bankruptcy. The company was then purchased by Kneissl & Friends and operated as before. However, in 1999, the owner of Kneissl & Friends undertook a re-branding exercise, creating Kneissl-Raichle. This change, combined with a move to produce the boot under license at Roces, failed, and sales slowed.

Kneissl & Friends was sold to Roces in 2001, and boot production under the Raichle brand ended. Many freestyle and mogul skiers considered the Flexon essential. When Flexon sales ended, eBay became a major source for parts to keep Flexon boots working. Skiers like Seth Morrison built up large stocks of spare parts to keep their boots on the hill.

=== After Flexon ===
In 2004, K2 Sports bought the original Flexon moulds, planning to enter the boot business. (Note: Another source says K2 purchased the moulds in 2005.) However, they initially did nothing with the design. In 2006, K2 purchased Line Skis, and Line decided to immediately re-launch the Flexon under the new brand-name, Full Tilt. Immediate turned out to be a relative term, and the new boots did not reach the market until early 2006 in Japan, Canada at the end of that year, and a full launch in 2008 in the US. Their first products were simple re-creations of the original Flexons, but the lineup has since seen several changes.

Around the same time, another famous free skier, Glen Plake, started working with Dalbello to create a Dalbello version of the Flexon three-piece concept. The result was the "Cabrio" design, which combined the basic three-piece tongue with modern buckles and other improvements. Released as the Krypton lineup, the boots made Dalbello well known among expert skiers for the first time in years. Dalbello has since started applying the three-piece design concept to different markets, including the back-country touring and traditional downhill.

Roxa, a sub-brand of Roces, continued selling a modified Flexon design in Europe. Nordica has also re-introduced a series of three-piece designs. Several new entrants have also introduced three-piece designs, or announced plans to do so.
