= Lange (ski boots) =

Ski boot manufacturer

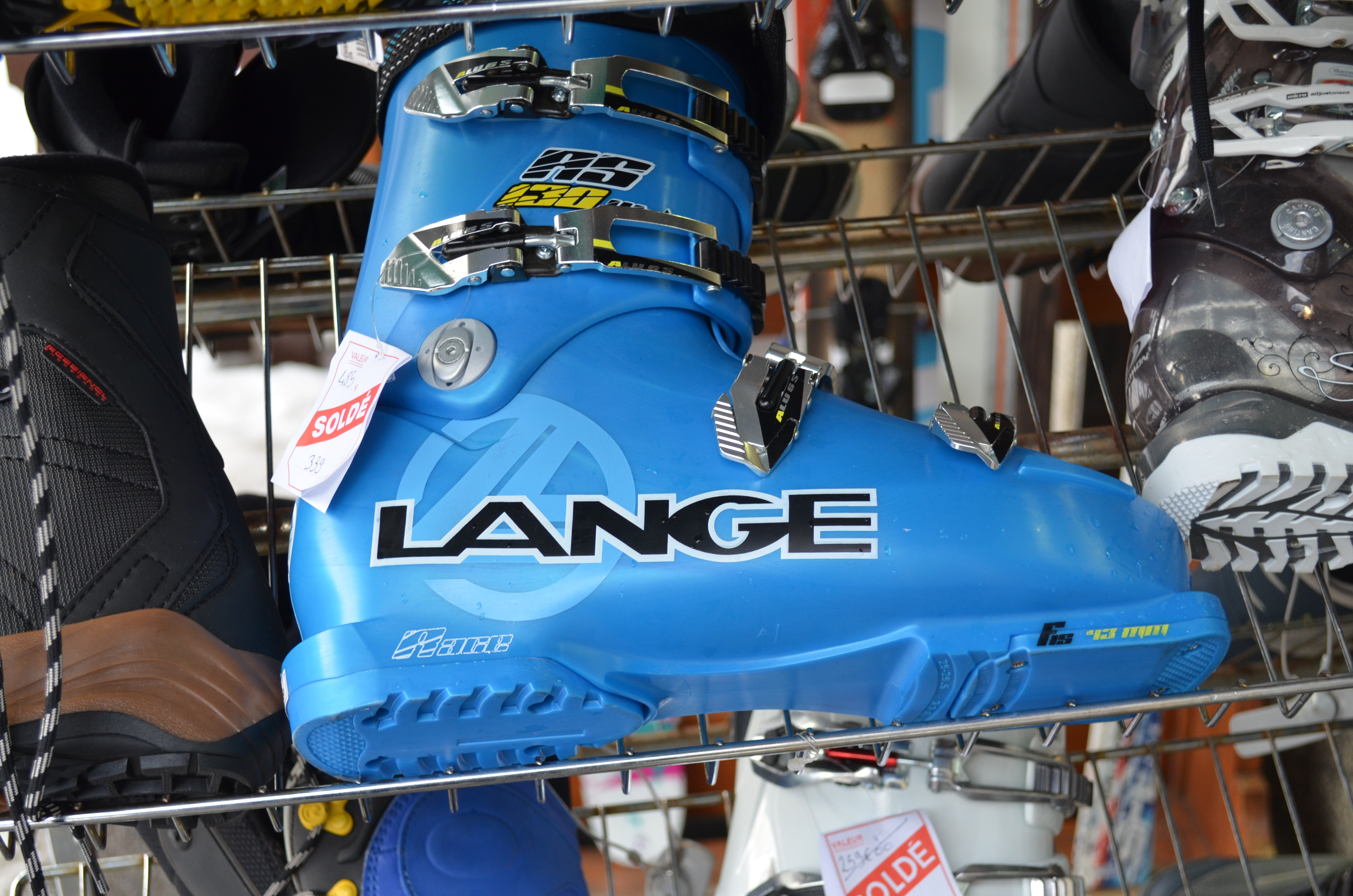
- Industry: Sportswear
- Founded: 1962; 64 years ago
- Founder: Bob Lange
- Products: Ski boots
- Website: lange-boots.com

Lange is a major producer of ski boots used in alpine (downhill) skiing, founded in 1948 in the USA. They introduced the world's first plastic ski boots in 1962, and a greatly improved model aimed at the racing market in 1965. After several World Cup and Olympics wins in 1967 and 1968 made them a must-have on the circuit, Lange has remained a force in the racing market ever since. Their boots have equipped five times as many World Cup medal winners as any other brand into the 2000s. The front-entry design introduced by Lange is used by almost every modern ski boot to this day. Lange remains a major brand worldwide.

Bob Lange had been experimenting with plastic reinforced ski boots as early as 1958, but it took some time before the basic design was made usable. The first examples from 1962, built by Lange employee Dave Luensmann, used acrylonitrile butadiene styrene (ABS) shells and laces for closure, but were not very successful. A follow-up design released in volume in the winter of 1965/66 used a new thermoplastic shell, hinged cuff, and latching buckles, and became the first commercially successful replacement for leather boots. By 1970 they were almost universal on the racing circuit, and selling hundreds of thousands of examples as the world's leading ski boot brand. Lange entered the hockey market during the 1970s. Lange skates were an outgrowth of their plastic ski boots. Phil Esposito endorsed and used Lange skates. They went out of favor due to their weight and non-traditional looks but had the advantages that they were comfortable to wear and offered more protection than traditional skates.

A major technical misstep in 1970 led to financial difficulties and the eventual sale of the company to Garcia in 1973. Under the new ownership, the company continued development of the classic front-opening ski boot design. Over a series of models, the cuff began extending up the calf of the leg to greatly improve directional control and reduce lower-leg injuries. Garcia ran into financial difficulties of their own, and their suite of ski products was purchased by the owner of Rossignol in 1978. Under their direction, Lange released the famous bright-orange XL-R and Z designs of the 1980s, versions of which remained the racer's choice well into the 1990s. Modern Lange boots have changed little in design since these models.

== History ==
=== Downhill develops ===
Alpine skiing developed as a specialization from what was generally a cross-country sport. The downhill portions were shallow, short and had to be skied up, so the majority of the day would be spent in the cross-country striding motion.

As techniques diverged, especially with the widespread introduction of ski lifts, the market for customized downhill equipment rose. A major advance came with the introduction of the Kandahar binding in the 1930s, which allowed the boot to be locked down to the ski during the downhill portions. This provided more control over "edging", rolling the ski onto its side to generate turning forces. The introduction of the Head Standard ski during the winter of 1950–1951 furthered this evolution by allowing the skis to hold an edge against the snow with much more force, dramatically improving turning performance. They were such a great improvement, the Standard was known as "The Cheater" because it allowed any skier to turn with ease.

Like the skis and bindings, ski boots had also evolved from earlier cross-country styles. By the 1950s these were essentially unchanged from the 1800s, consisting of a thick sole with a thinner upper shell of leather, similar to a normal winter boot. A flexible sole allowed the boot to bend forward at the toe to allow the cross-country striding motion. The upper cuff provided little sideways support, as this had not been a serious concern for cross-country. Ideally, for downhill skiing the boot would be rigid side-to-side to transmit rotational forces to the ski, allowing the skier to edge the ski directly. Moreover, in the downhill role there was no need for forward flex of the sole, which was clamped down anyway.

=== Downhill before Lange ===
This need led to downhill boots that retained the same basic shoe-like style of earlier designs, but were built much stiffer to allow for greater control. These had the serious drawback of being extremely uncomfortable. This was especially true during the breaking-in period, which might last weeks. One solution had the skier lace up the boots and stand in hot water in a bathtub for an hour to soak, then walk around to allow the leather to move to fit the skier's foot. This had the disadvantage of greatly softening the boot, allowing it to wear out much more quickly.

Even if this hot water fitting step wasn't used, strong skiers would wear out their boots in months as the leather softened, and mere weeks if they raced them. This left only a short period of time between the painful break-in period and the time when the boots were too soft to provide good control over the skis. Jean-Claude Killy took to having Michel Arpin ski in his boots while they broke in, giving them to Killy to ski for the few weeks before they wore out. Another solution to improve lateral control was the "long thong", a leather strap wrapped around the boot and lower leg, which came at the cost of eliminating any sort of quick release.

=== Lange's first attempts ===
Robert B. ("Bob") Lange flew Lockheed P-38 Lightning airplanes for the United States Army Air Forces before leaving to earn a degree at Harvard University, where he studied economics and engineering. It was during this time that he took up skiing, and like many other beginner skiers of the era, found himself dismayed by the relative antiquity of the designs. (Contrast with the Head Standard ski).

Lange had another problem to solve; his size 9-1/2 triple-E wide feet demanded custom boots, which he ordered from Peter Limmer. These were not stiff enough for his liking, so Lange attempted to fix this by cutting strips of fiberglass left over from covering his boat, and gluing them to his boots using polyester resin. This 1948 attempt is the earliest recorded attempt at a plastic-reinforced boot.

After graduating in 1949 he joined his family insurance business in Dubuque, Iowa, but did this only for a short time. Lange opened Hawkeye Plastics Corporation in the basement of the old Brunswick Radio Company factory, which had gone bankrupt during the Great Depression. In 1955 he received his first contract, from the Eska Company also located in Dubuque, when General Motors asked Eska for 30,000 kiddie-cars in the form of the 1956 Corvette. Lange's company produced the plastic Corvette bodies for Eska. Over the next few years the company produced a variety of fiberglass products, including hula-hoops and the interiors for refrigerators.

Throughout, Lange continued to experiment with improvements to ski boots, buying numerous pairs to cut them up and see if they could be re-enforced to make them stronger. Lange was not the only designer to attempt this, and several boots soaked in epoxy or other glues were available in the 1950s. None of these offered any great improvement, and lacing them up was even more difficult than before. Lange had built several models with epoxy or polyester by 1958, later claiming to have skied a successful all-plastic boot in 1957.

=== Royalite ===
Fiberglass simply didn't have the right combination of features for an all-plastic boot. As part of the Corvette contract, Lange's Hawkeye Plastics had sub-contracted the seats to another local plastics company, run by David Luensmann. Luensmann had made the seats for the cars by vacuum-molding Royalite, an ABS plastic from Uniroyal. When Lange's Hawkeye went out of business, enough of this material was left over to experiment with boot designs, and Lange asked Luensmann to try it.

Luensmann used strips of the material in a heat press to melt them into a single shell. He handed the results to Lange the next year, in the summer of 1961. After trying them that winter, Lange asked Luensmann to join him in a new company dedicated to making plastic boots. For mass production, the two built a vacuum press to shape the cuffs from larger sections of Royalite. This produced an extremely stiff boot suitable only for the most powerful racers. Attempting to solve the problem, they struck on the solution of molding the boot in two separate parts and joining them through rivets on either side, at the level of the ankle. This allowed the boot to retain all the lateral stiffness of the original design, while allowing the forward flex to be better controlled.

The new design, in blue and white, was released in limited numbers in 1962. Several people tried them out and reported a number of minor design issues, especially the problems lacing them up which often required two people. Levered buckles were an obvious solution, first invented by Hans Martin and introduced to the market in 1955 on the Henke Speedfit. However, Henke held the patent on the concept and Lange was reluctant to pay for a license.

By the winter of 1963 they had managed to fill only a small number of their orders and even smaller number were in use. These few boots suffered a number of mechanical failures that were traced to the poor performance of ABS plastic in low temperatures.

=== Adiprene ===
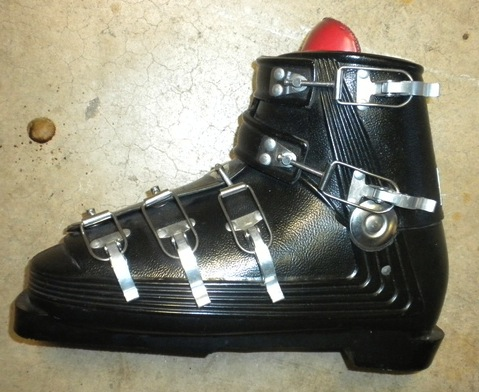
The Lange Swinger, part of the "2nd generation" lineup from around 1968. These early examples clearly trace their ancestry to the leather boots they replaced, including a leather-like mottled surface treatment.

In late 1962 DuPont provided a solution, a new pourable polyurethane plastic known as Adiprene. This material was much less affected by the cold, but had the distinct disadvantage that it could not be vacuum-molded, as it needed to be used in liquid form. Instead, it had to be heated and poured into a mold and then allowed to cool and set. This made it much more time consuming to use in production, but the advantages were too great to ignore. The company spent most of 1963 trying to solve the production problems, ignoring the growing list of orders for the older ABS models.

In the end, no production of the new design was undertaken that year, leading to friction with his sales partners. In 1965 Lange finally added Henke-like buckles to his boots when that company gave up the patent. Not only did the buckle make it easy to close even the stiffest boots, the plastic spread the load across the entire cuff, applying even pressure to the foot. Leather designs tended to distort where the buckles attached, leading to tight spots on the foot and eventually damaging the leather.

It was not until 1965 they had built a new molding machine known as "Mickey Mouse" that could inject the Adiprene to speed production. This system was only marginally functional, and only 600 pairs of boots were produced that year. It was not until early 1966 that full production was able to start and 1,000 pairs had been completed. By the end of the year the number stood at 6,000, doubling in 1967 to 12,000, and again in 1968 to 25,000.

By this time, Rosemount Engineering had introduced their own all-synthetic boot. Unlike the Lange, the Rosemount design was made of rigid fiberglass and split open in two parts to put it on. Like Lange, they were only able to produce small numbers of boots, about 900 pair, for the 1965/66 season. Many sources make the claim that Rosemount was first to introduce a plastic boot commercially, but it appears that both were available in limited numbers at the same time. In any event, Lange's earlier Royalite models clearly pre-date any of the Rosemount examples.

=== Commercial success ===
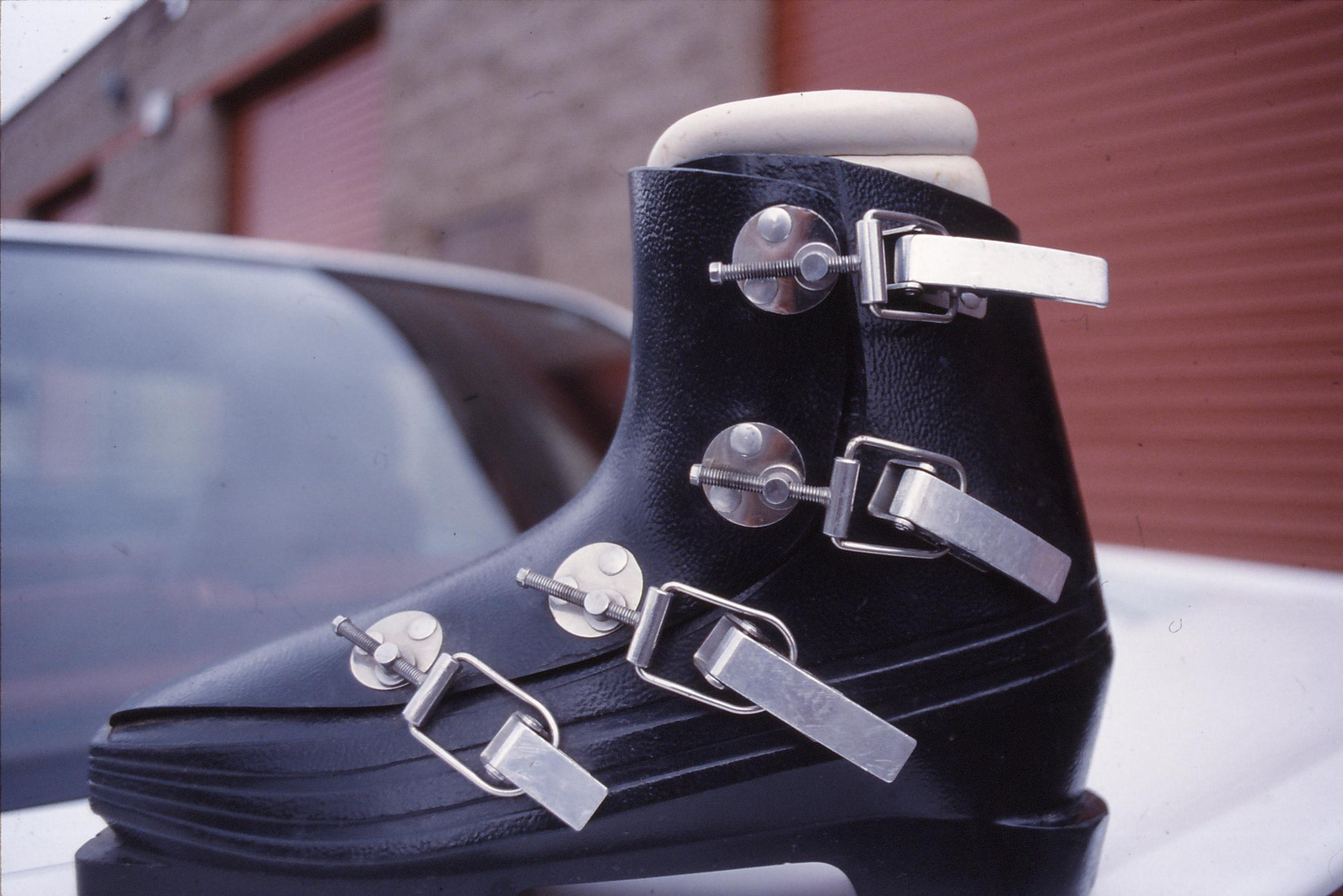
1968's Lady Lange Competite was the first women's-specific race boot, the companion to the Comp model. It differs from the Comp in that it uses a single large flap over the front of the boot, a design note that did not continue on future models.

Production was not the only issue; the new design also needed a test market to popularize it. Lange approached the United States ski team hoping to have them test the new design. However, they were being supplied by Heirling, and weren't interested.

In January 1966, Lange called Dave Jacob, who was at that time coaching the Canadian ski team. Lange asked if Jacob would be willing to try the new boots with the Canadian team. Jacob agreed and several team members tried them out, but he noted that "they were really bad boots." Lange paid Jacob's way to Dubuque to help implement solutions for his concerns.

In June 1966 five pairs of boots incorporating these changes were shipped to Mount Hood, where the Canadian team was training. Gerry Rinaldi, Rod Hebron and Nancy Greene tried them on and approved. Soon after, Greene won the Golden Rose Race on the new boots. Lange then flew to the 1966 World Championships in Portillo, Chile and handed out examples to anyone willing to test them. He carried around a tape recorder, asking for any suggestions on how to improve the design. When Hebron and Suzy Chaffee showed dramatic improvement during the races, the new boot became an object of serious curiosity. Curiosity changed to must-have when Greene started winning races in 1967 on the newly formed World Cup circuit, and eventually took the gold medal.

Five medals were won on Lange boots at the 1968 Winter Olympics, making them the most-winning brand of the competition. At the Olympics, Lange signed a deal with Dynamic to produce their line of skis for the North American market. The company went public in 1969, and used the proceeds to purchase land in Broomfield, Colorado, building a 40,000 square foot (3,700 m^{2}) boot factory, a 42,000 square foot (3,900 m^{2}) ski factory, and a 20,000 square foot (1,900 m^{2}) warehouse. The new factories dramatically improved production, and over the 1969 season alone the company shipped 100,000 pairs of boots.

1969 was the breakthrough year for the company. Three models were on the market to serve different performance levels, the Standard for recreational skiing, the Pro for more demanding use, and the Comp for downhill racing. There was only one competitor, Rosemont, but their product was based on fiberglass and used a side-opening system that was clearly inferior to Lange's boots and could only compete on the low-end, in spite of a high-end price. By the end of the season, Lange was being sold at hundreds of stores across the country at prices no one else could demand.

To reach new markets, plans for a new boot factory in Montebelluna, Italy started, along with another in Montreal to produce ice skates using similar concepts and materials. The Montreal plant was later expanded to sell ski boots to Europe as well, avoiding import tariffs on US products. On top of this, at the 1970 World Championships at Val Gardena, Billy Kidd won the gold medal in Combined on Lange boots, and Lange or Dynamic took medals in every event, men and women's.

=== Lange-flo ===
Alden Hanson of Dow Chemical contacted Lange in 1970 to tell them about a new material the company had invented. The new plastic retained a putty-like texture in any weather, and Hanson's son had used it to make boots with a layer of the material sandwiched between a normal leather boot and a hard fiberglass shell. The material was a natural fit with Lange's plastic boots, fitting between the liner and shell.

When Lange staff tried it, they unanimously supported it. The timing proved difficult, however; 200,000 pairs of boots were planned for the 1970–1971 season, and if they were going to use the newly christened "Lange-flo" it would have to go into production before there was time for extensive testing. Lange decided to press ahead, putting it in all of their boots for the next model year.

The boots were launched with a provocative advertising campaign of a woman wearing the new boots and a cat-suit with the same boot buckles holding it closed, in place of a zipper or buttons. The only wording simply stated "soft inside". This was the first of a series of provocative ads now referred to simply as "the Lange girls".

Although the Lange-flo worked, the vinyl liner that held it proved to crack after hard use, (Note: Most sources suggest that the Lange-flo interacted chemically with the vinyl and broke it down.) and let the Lange-flo squeeze into the boot. The solution was to place the Lange-flo in a separate plastic bag outside the liner, but as the liners were sewn into the boot, this required a recall to re-fit them. About 20,000 of the 200,000 boots shipped that season returned to the factory. (Note: Lund suggests that the recall resulted in close to 90% of all the Lange-flo boots being returned for work, but other sources place it at 10%.) In their attempt to deal with the problem in a timely fashion, new staff were added and theft became a problem. Bad record keeping and lost tags led to many boots being shipped to the wrong people. Many simply never received their boots back.

At about the same time, Dynamic started protesting its agreement with Lange, while cash was needed to start the Canadian plant and introduce the new skate design. Emergency loans kept the company going through 1971, when they reported a $1.5 million loss, largely due to the warrantee work due to Lange-flo. The next year Hanson introduced their rear-entry design, the first real competitor. Lange shares continued to drop throughout.

In 1973 a further round of funding failed, and Lange sold the company to Garcia Company, owners of the Mitchell Reel fishing tackle company and tennis brands that was building a ski portfolio. Lange signed on as a consultant to Garcia, but didn't like the results. He left the company shortly thereafter, in July 1974.

=== Extending upward ===
Early plastic boots, like their earlier leather cousins, rose just above the ankle and provided little support if the skier leaned forward or back. Around 1966 the French developed a new short-turn technique called avalement that stored energy by bending the tail of the ski and then using this to accelerate out of turns. This required the skier to lean back on the skis, and to support this style, skiers took to adding any number of ad-hoc solutions to add support at the back.

During the 1970–1971 season, Jack Nagel introduced the "Jet-Stix", an aftermarket accessory designed to be used on plastic boots from Lange or Rosemont. The Jet-Stix consisted of a fiberglass extension shaped like a shoehorn that strapped on under the top buckle so it lay along the back of the calf. These allowed the skier to lean back and raise the front of the ski upward with ease. Lange quickly followed with their own version, the Lange Spoiler. Similar devices were common through 1970.

In 1967 Nordica introduced a new injection-moulded "hybrid" design that wrapped a stiff shell around a conventional leather boot. The innerboot was removable for custom fit work, a major advance over Lange's cemented-in liner. This saw little interest, but Nordica followed this in 1969 with their Astral design, a direct attack on Lange. Their introduction of the bright yellow Astral Slalom in 1972, better known as the "Banana Boot", incorporated a spoiler directly into the cuff and eliminated the need for a separate device. Soon Nordica were selling 400,000 pairs a year, Lange's first serious competition in the market.

For the 1971-1972 season, Lange introduced the "Comp II" boot, following on their earlier Comp series racing boots but incorporating the higher back similar to the Nordica design. The Comp II was soon joined by the Pro II. The entire line was revamped for the 1974-75 season, featuring taller cuffs, improved liners, wider buckles, and colored shells. The one-piece Comp II was replaced by the Banshee, a red-orange two-piece, 5-buckle shell design that used four rivets and epoxy in the cuff behind the ankle to reduce flex at the hinge. Lange and Nordica innovations set off an industry-wide evolution to ever-higher cuffs, culminating in the 1980s with cuffs that rise about halfway to the knee. During this period, the Banshee brand was relegated to a mid-range model. Some designs, the "knee highs", had secondary cuffs that rose to just below the knee.

Under Garcia, Lange continued to improve the boot design, while at the same time they introduced Lange branded skis based on Dynamic models, purchased the Burt ski binding, and added a range of products like ski poles and goggles. Garcia became the first company to offer a complete range of ski gear as an integrated set. Throughout, Garcia's main product line remained its fishing gear, and during the mid-1970s a wave of Japanese competitors arrived and quickly pushed them out of the fishing market. The company went bankrupt in 1978, after owning Lange for only four years.

=== Boix-Vives and Rossignol ===
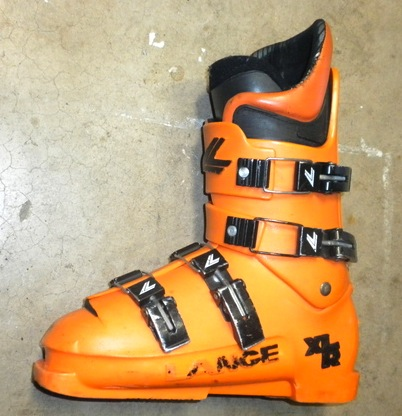
The XL-R cemented Lange's reputation as the racer's boot of choice. Modern boots are little changed from this example from the early 1980s.

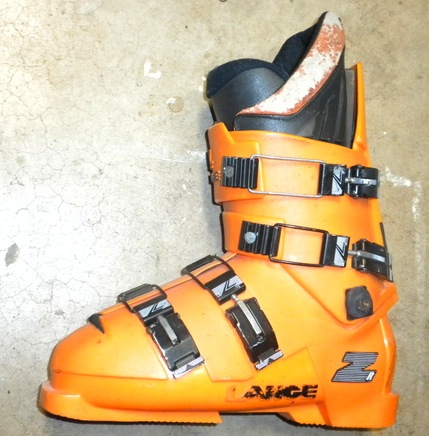
The Z-R followed the XL-R with a number of minor upgrades. The buckles lock closed, and are released by pulling on the small tabs. A control for the "cant" of the boot has been added, the small black square over the ankle. Minor changes like this followed all the way to current examples.

When Garcia's bankruptcy put them on the market, Rossignol, the famous ski company, was looking to enter the tennis market. Rossignol purchased Garcia's existing tennis production lines and started selling off the other divisions; when Lange skis and Burt bindings failed to find a buyer they were closed down. The same fate awaited Lange boots, but Rossignol's CEO, Laurent Boix-Vives, purchased the company personally through a Swiss holding company, Ski Expansion.

New warehouses were opened in Williston and Colchester, Vermont, where Rossignol and Dynastar skis were sent for distribution into the North American market. For a time, Dynastar skis made in the Authier factory were sold under the Lange brand in the United States. During the late 1970s, the rising United States dollar exchange rate and historically-high interest rates made United States operations increasingly expensive. Many North American ski companies found themselves unable to compete with Europe, even as the ski industry was being hit by low participation rates for the same economic reasons. In 1982 Boix-Vives closed the Garcia factories, including Lange in Colorado, moving all boot production to Lange's factory in Italy. Research and development for Lange remained in Colorado.

In 1982 they introduced the famous bright-orange XL-R design. The XL-R had a number of improvements over earlier models. Among these was a new buckle design; previous designs generally use a metal loop attached on one side of the cuff and a buckle with a rack cut into the bottom attached to the other. For tighter settings the loop had to be inserted into a rack cut higher on the buckle, lowering the mechanical advantage and making it much harder to close. The new design moved the rack to one cuff and put the metal loop on the buckle itself. This offered steady mechanical advantage on any setting. The new four-buckle system is largely identical to any modern downhill ski boot.

The XL-R was a runaway hit on the racing market and soon followed by the XL-S and XL-T versions for different performance levels. The XL series were also well known for the way they allowed water to leak into the boot where the lower cuffs folded over each other near the toe, and prompted many owners to cover the area with duct tape. The liners also tended to "pack down" fairly quickly, flattening out and no longer offering support. An improved version of the basic XL design was later introduced as the Z-model, which included a new low-profile locking buckle design that would not accidentally open once locked, and a small plastic tab in front of the toe flaps to prevent snow forcing its way in.

Meanwhile, the Italian factory at Montebelluna was experimenting with a new custom-fit liner, using a thermosetting plastic called Thermofit. Pressed by rapid changes in the market, notably Salomon's introduction of their hugely successful rear-entry boot line, the Thermofit system was developed as a way to remain on the leading edge. Betting the company on the new system, it failed in testing, leaving the company with no catchy designs. Among the failed attempts to address this problem were in-boot heaters, the CFX and SPE rear-entry designs largely identical to Salomon models, and a "mid-entry" boot with cable closure, the Mid.

Of all of these, only the mid-entry design would be at all successful the market. This design combines a traditional lower boot with a split upper cuff like that of a rear-entry design. The lower portion buckled down to provide strong support, whereas conventional rear-entry boots were sometimes noted for the lack of support for the forward foot and general softness in the leg cuff. Lange no longer produces a mid-entry design, and examples from other companies are also becoming rare.

By the late 1980s, Rossignol was in the process of building out their own line of products similar to Garcia's earlier attempts. This led to their purchase of Dynastar and other ski brands. In 1989 they purchased Lange from Boix-Vives, ending Lange ski production. Lange was partnered with Dynastar skis and (after 1994) Look bindings, a pairing that remains to this day. In 2001, Lange continued to be the brand of racing, equipping five times as many many medal-winning skiers in the World Cup as any other brand.

=== Quiksilver ===
In March 2005, after years of cycling profits that followed the United States dollar exchange rate, and facing retirement at age 78, Boix-Vives decided to sell his stake in Rossignol. His share was purchased for $55 million by the Australian/United States sporting wear company, Quiksilver, part of a larger $213 million deal. Boix-Vives took over operations of Rossignol's golf division.

Quiksilver consolidated all of their North American operations in Park City, Utah. Unfortunately for Quiksilver, this was occurring in a period of poor snow, and profits plummeted. In 2007 several board members, including Boix-Vives, quit the company. With no experienced managers left, and losses on the order of $50 million in the skiing divisions, Quiksilver soon put the company up for sale.

In August 2008, Quiksilver announced that it would be selling the Rossignol group to Chartreuse & Mont Blanc, a wholly owned shell company formed by Macquarie Group of Australia.

In July 2013, Macquairie sold the Rossignol Group, along with its subsidiaries Lange and Dynastar, to a partnership of Altor Equity Partners (a Swedish investment group) and the Boix-Vives family.
