= Hanson Industries (ski boots) =

- Industry: Sportswear
- Founded: 1969; 56 years ago
- Founders: Chris Hanson; Denny Hanson
- Defunct: 1984
- Fate: Declared for bankruptcy; Purchased by Daiwa
- Products: Ski boots

Hanson Industries invented and popularized the rear-entry ski boot. Formed by brothers Chris and Denny Hanson in 1969, the company became a huge success in the late 1970s. A series of missteps in the early 1980s led to a rapid death spiral and the company went bankrupt in 1984. It was purchased by Daiwa, a Japanese fishing tackle company that handled Hanson's distribution in Japan. Daiwa ended sales in North America and Europe. European products, notably the famous Salomon SX series, used Hanson's exit as a springboard to market domination during the second half of the 1980s. Denny Hanson later introduced the "Apex" design, which combines features of alpine and snowboarding boots.

== History ==
=== Flo-fit ===
Alden Hanson Sr. was the chief scientist at Dow Chemical during the 1950s and '60s. He led the development of a Silly Putty-like plastic known as "Flo-fit" and started looking for applications. Alden's son Chris used some to make a better ski boot, which at the time were simple leather boots that were extremely uncomfortable and quickly wore out. Chris built a fiberglass shell that fitted over the entire foot area of the boot to provide support, and then filled the gap with Flo-fit to provide cushioning between the two. The prototype was only one boot, not a pair, and Chris stopped working on the design.

Around the same time, Bob Lange started work on a new ski boot design using plastics in place of leather. It took several years of development before he had a suitable design, and widespread sales started in the winter of 1965-66. These early designs were very stiff and offered a tremendous improvement in control, but they became even more uncomfortable than the leather designs they replaced when the inner liner lost its elasticity around pressure points. The area around the leg cuff and especially the ankle would wear out quickly and could draw blood.

In 1968, Alden Hanson started negotiations with Bob Lange to add Flo-fit to Lange's boot designs. Lange proved interested, and hired Chris, an industrial designer, and his brother Denny (Alden Hanson Jr.), a salesman for Head Skis, to help design a system to incorporate the newly christened "Lange-flo" into their boot lineup. However, Chris proved more interested in developing a new boot design than working on Lange-flo, and Lange dismissed them both in 1969. (Note: Masia appears to disagree in the two references below; one suggests the two left Lange in 1969 to work on the boot design, but the other implies that they were fired sometime later. The date of formation of the company suggests that the 1969 date is correct.)

However, the liners ended up failing when the Lange-flo interacted with the vinyl in cold weather. This allowed the Lange-flo to squeeze into the boot, and led to millions of dollars in warranty work in the 1969-1970 season.

=== Forming Hanson ===
During 1969, the Hansons were building prototypes of their new boot design, and in June 1970, they formed Hanson Industries to produce them. The boot was moulded in two halves, front and back, both of relatively simple shaping that made them very easy to remove from the moulds, at least compared to traditional front-entry designs like Lange where the shaping results in complex moulds. A single buckle locked the rear portion forward onto the front for closure.

Unlike later designs, the Hanson boot did not have a pivot point to allow forward flex of the leg. Instead, the one-piece forward section ran from the toe to the mid-calf area as a continuous piece, and was designed to be flexible. The rear section of the boot fits inside the front, clamping forward. When the skier flexed forward, the front section would simply bend with the leg, and the rear section would be pulled forward with it by the buckle. The inner liner was a one-piece system similar to a thick sock. As the foot area was a single piece there was no way to snug it down; instead it was made very large and fit to an individual's foot shape by filling a plastic bag over the instep with hot wax.

The design was released during 1971, and during the fall they shipped 2,500 pairs to stores across the US. They proved to be a hit, and by 1975, the company was competing with Lange for the number one position in the boot market. Improvements followed in the Riva design, which split the front section into left and right sections and held them together with a clip. By moving the clip up or down a fitting along the instep, the forward flex could be easily controlled. With the clip at the top position, on the shin, the front section of the boot had to move forward as a unit, set lower on the leg or even over the foot area allowed some of the forward motion to push the two halves apart to the side, lowering resistance.

=== Continued success ===
During the later half of the 1970s, many ski and boot companies rushed to introduce their own rear-entry designs. This was particularly attractive to companies that had not previously been involved in boots, as the traditional market for front-entry systems was fairly well established.

O'Brien, Scott and Rosemount all introduced versions similar to the Hanson. K2 introduced the "Three", which reversed the Hanson pattern by making the rear flap much larger and bucking on the front like a conventional front-entry design. None of these had a major impact on Hanson's sales, and in the period between 1978 and 1981, the company was shipping an average of 120,000 pairs of boots a year. This represented about half of the high end boot market in the US, at least on a dollar basis.

Flush with success, Hanson decided to reverse this pattern and enter the ski market. Hexcel produced a well-regarded product using a honeycomb material in place of wood or foam, but the company decided to focus on the aerospace market and was looking to sell their ski factory. Hanson purchased the entire line. They also arranged a deal with the Spyder ski wear brand, offering high-end racing boots under this marque.

=== Rapid failure ===
Hanson had decided from the start to try to keep steady employment through the year, instead of using temporary workers to fill the needs of the winter season rush. To do this, the company borrowed money from the banks to fund production, which it repaid with the proceeds from sales during the winter. When US interest rates soared to 22% in 1980, the company was hard hit. They started looking for a European factory, but never finalized a deal.

To add to their problems, the winter of 1982-83 was famed for a lack of snow, and the entire ski industry was hard hit. Many Hanson dealers failed to pay, and the company quickly ran out of cash. In 1984, they sold the company to Daiwa, their Japanese distributor, who quickly withdrew the brand from North America and Europe. It continues to exist in Japan. (Note: Masia (2003) states the company went bankrupt in 1981; Masia (2007) states it was 1983/84. The date of known examples of the Spyder boots suggests that the later time is correct.)

=== Salomon's success ===
Salomon started as a ski binding company, but watched the boot market throughout the 1970s. In 1979, they introduced their first boot, the SX90, a complex rear-entry design. The design did not sell well, with only 30,000 examples shipping in the next two seasons.

Salomon continued development, and in 1983, they introduced the SX91 design. The SX91 offered easy control over almost every possible movement of the boot. It was a huge success, entering the market right as Hanson was in the process of exiting it. Sales were limited only by their ability to manufacture enough to meet demand. Entries from Nordica and the three-part designs from Raichle propelled the rear-entry design to the forefront, making up about 80% of the market in 1987.

=== After Hanson ===
After selling the company, the Hanson brothers continued to work with the Flo-fit material, founding the Flolite company and offering a number of products outside the ski industry. These included boot inserts, bike seats and wheel chair cushions, among others.

During the 2000s, Denny re-entered the ski boot market with the Apex ski boot. The Apex consists of two entirely separate parts, a semi-stiff boot that uses the Boa Closure System instead of laces or buckles, and an outer carbon fibre shell that provides the needed lateral support and mounting points for conventional downhill ski bindings.
