= Nordic skiing =

Skiing variant

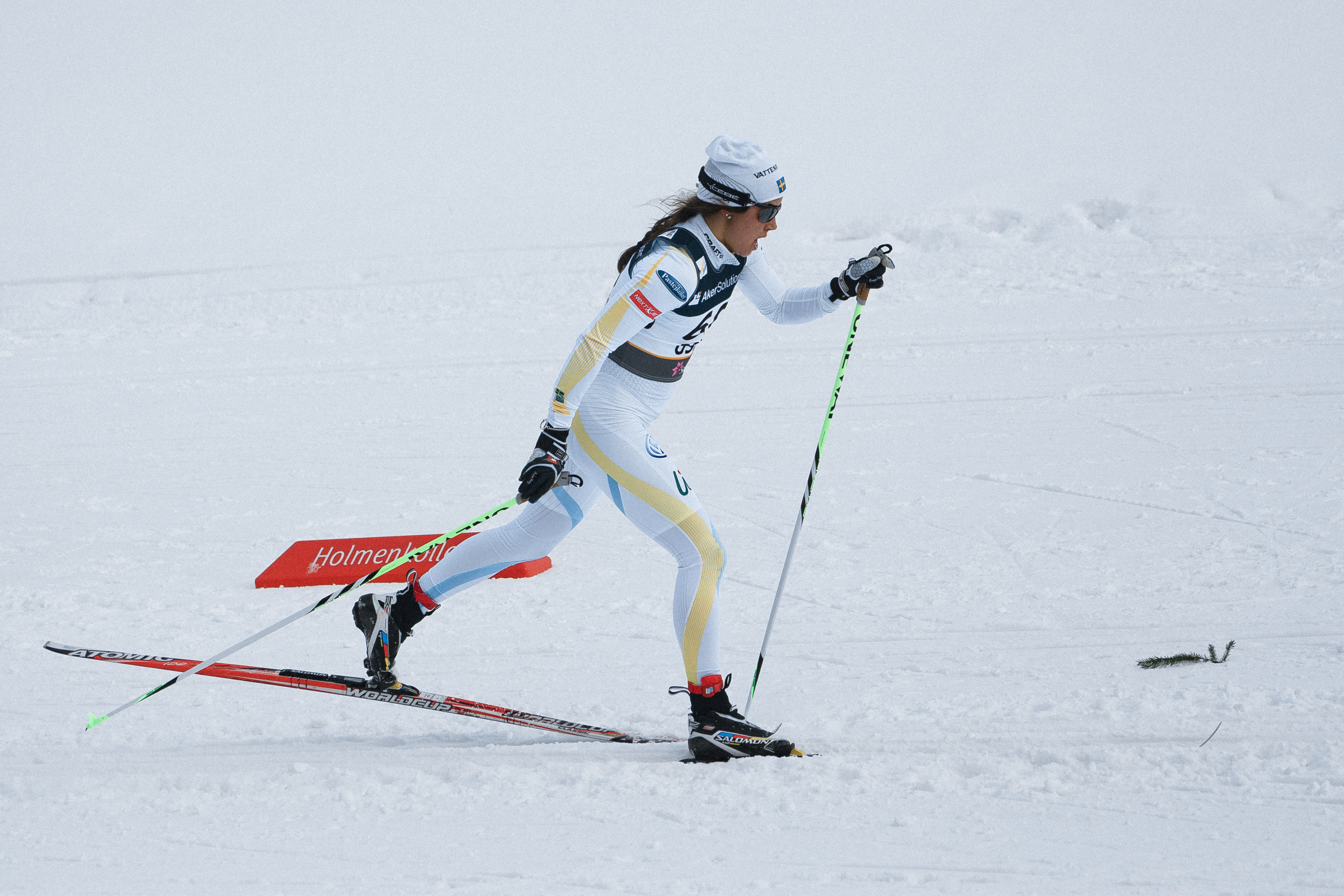
- Anna Haag in the women's 10 km classic race at the 2011 FIS Nordic World Ski Championships in Oslo, Norway.

Characteristics
- Type: outdoors
- Equipment: skis, skipoles

Presence
- Olympic: 1924 – present
- Paralympic: 1976 – present

Nordic skiing encompasses the various types of skiing in which the toe of the ski boot is fixed to the binding in a manner that allows the heel to rise off the ski, unlike alpine skiing, where the boot is attached to the ski from toe to heel. Recreational disciplines include cross-country skiing and Telemark skiing.

Olympic events are competitive cross-country skiing, ski jumping and Nordic combined — an event combining cross-country skiing and ski jumping. The FIS Nordic World Ski Championships host these sports every odd-numbered year, but there are also separate championships in other events, such as Telemark skiing and ski flying. Biathlon combines cross-country skiing and rifle shooting, but is not included as a Nordic discipline under the rules of the International Ski Federation (FIS). Instead, it comes under the jurisdiction of the International Biathlon Union.

The biomechanics of competitive cross-country skiing and ski jumping have been the subject of serious study. Cross-country skiing requires strength and endurance and ski jumping requires aerodynamic efficiency, both of which requirements translate into specific skills to be optimized in training and competition.

== Origins ==
Recreational skiing began with organized skiing exercises and races of the infantry troops of the Norwegian and Swedish armies. Military races and exercises included downhill in rough terrain, target practice while skiing downhill, and 3 km cross-country skiing with full military backpack. Slalom (Norwegian: slalåm) is a word of Norwegian origin that has entered the international skiing vocabulary. In the 1800s skiers in Telemark challenged each other on "wild slopes" (ville låmir), more gentle slopes had the adjective "sla". Some races were on "bumpy courses" (kneikelåm) and sometimes included "steep jumps" (sprøytehopp) for difficulty. These 19th century races in Telemark ran along particularly difficult trails usually from a steep mountain, along timber-slides and ended with a sharp turn ("Telemark turn") on a field or icy lake.

== Classic skiing ==
Classic skiing was the first type of skiing, using grips on the bottom of the ski to allow the skier to push against the ground. This technique is considered slower than skate skiing.

== Skate skiing ==
Skate skiing is a type of skiing where the skier pushes off the ground with their foot to gain speed. This technique was developed in the mid-1980s and since 1985 many races had different races for classic skiing and skate skiing due to the speed of skate skiing. Skate skiing uses many techniques for different terrains.

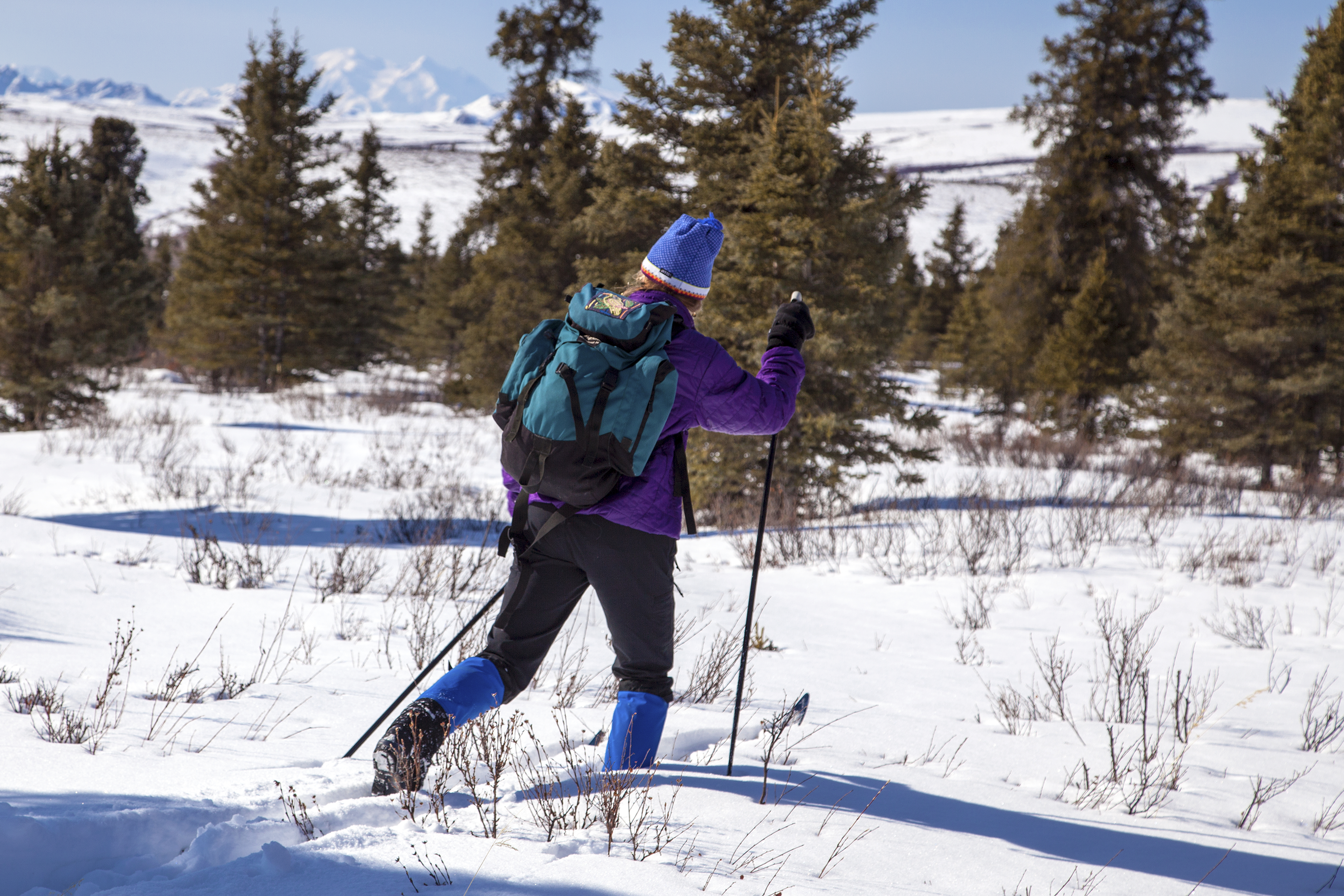
Wilderness cross-country skiing in Alaska.

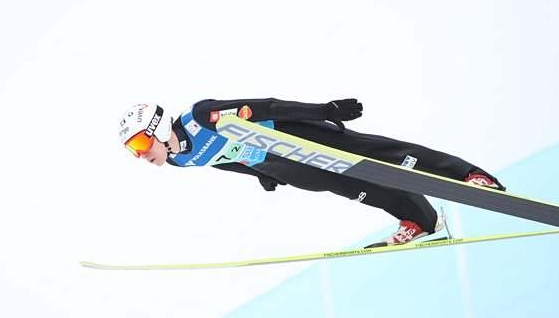
Jurij Tepeš during team competition of FIS Ski-Flying World Championships 2012 in Vikersund, Norway.

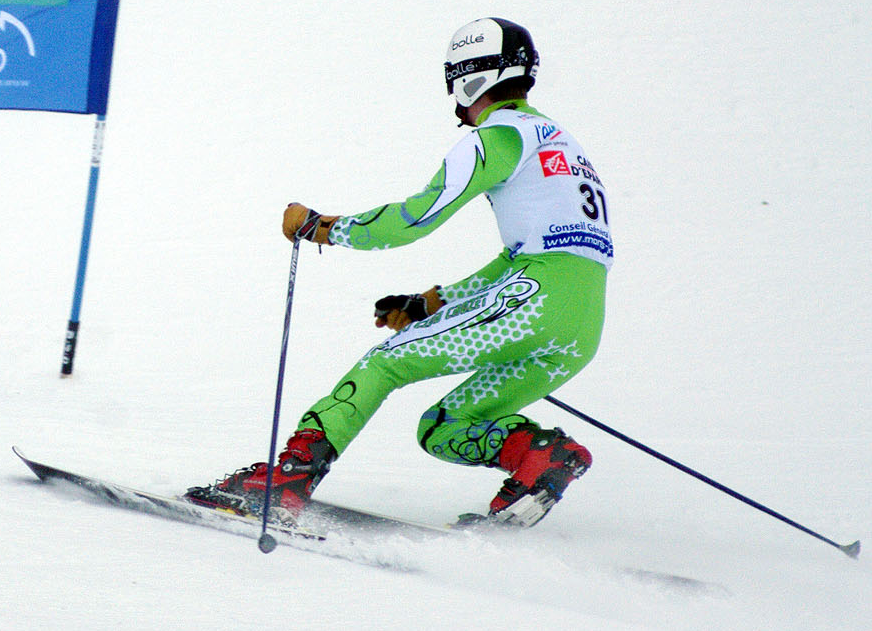
Telemark skiing competition
