= Rosemount Inc. =

Minnesotan manufacturer of measurement tools

Rosemount
- Company type: Division
- Industry: Oil & Gas, Life Sciences, Chemical, Pharmaceutical, Marine, Power, Water & Wastewater, Packaging, Metals & Mining, Refining, Petrochem
- Founded: 1956
- Headquarters: Shakopee, MN
- Products: Measurement Instrumentation: Pressure, temperature, marine, level, and DP flow. Analytical instrumentation for gas analysis, liquid analysis, flame and gas detection, and analytical systems
- Revenue: 2.7$ billion dollars
- Number of employees: 8500
- Parent: Emerson Electric Co.
- Website: Emerson.com/Rosemount

Rosemount Inc. is a subsidiary of Emerson Electric Company. Its headquarters is located in Shakopee, Minnesota, where they manufacture measurement instrumentation such as pressure, temperature, level, DP flow, and wireless, as well as analytical and detection instrumentation for gas analysis, liquid analysis, combustion measurement and flame and gas detection.

== History ==
Rosemount Engineering was founded by Frank Werner, Robert Keppel, and Vernon Heath in the Minneapolis–Saint Paul area in 1956 with a focus on the aerospace industry, which was then growing rapidly under the expansion of the U.S. space program. In 1966, the company diversified to the commercial processing industry and became known as Rosemount Inc.

Rosemount's founders, Frank Werner and Vernon Heath, took up skiing in the 1950s, and decided to introduce a better ski boot. This led to the Rosemount ski boot of 1965, one of the first all-synthetic designs. The ski factory was sold to Bass Sports in 1968, but the Rosemount brand was used until it was purchased by Raichle in 1972.

Its success captured the attention of several high-tech companies. Rosemount was acquired by Emerson Electric Company in August 1976.

In 2013, Emerson announced the purchase of a new global headquarters location in Shakopee, Minnesota for its Rosemount branded products headquarters. Its 500,000-square-foot (46,000 m^{2}) building was originally built for ADC Telecommunications, but was abandoned in 2001 prior to completion and had never been occupied.

The Rosemount brand is associated with Emerson, Emerson Automation Solutions, Rosemount, Rosemount Inc, and Rosemount Engineering.
