= Nava System =

Ski binding

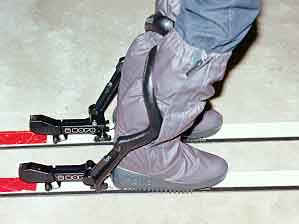
A pair of Nava System bindings with the skier in place. The boot is clipped into the binding, which is almost flush with the ski, and the control arm, black, is in place behind the skiers calf.

The Nava System was a ski binding and custom ski boot offered for sale in the 1980s. The system used a combination of flexible sole plate to keep the boot centered, and a spring-loaded plastic arm on the rear binding that was used to transmit sideways motions of the leg to the ski. This eliminated the need for a hard shell on the boot; the Nava boot was soft and resembled a knee-high winter boot. In spite of numerous endorsements by racing stars, the system never caught on and sales ended by the late 1980s.

== History ==
The system was invented in the early 1970s by an Italian architect and skier, Antonio Faullin. He patented the design and sold the production rights in the mid-1970s. No production commenced, and the design was subsequently sold off to a number of manufacturers.

The design eventually found its way to Pier Luigi Nava, an avid skier whose company produced motorcycle helmets. Using injection moulding construction techniques used for the helmets, Nava was able to develop a polyurethane boot plate that replaced the former metal models. Metal plate bindings were popular in the 1970s, but the hard plate was difficult to walk on and subject to wear; Nava's soft plate and boot eliminated both problems.

Nava first showed the system in April 1983 in Italy, and started sales in the winter of 83/84, and Canada in 1985. Frank Vener, an American who marketed a number of European brands in the US, started Nava Leisure USA and started sales in February 1986. There were two models, the Sansicario sold for $495 while the Cortina sold for $595, both well at the high end of the market.

Early reviews were generally positive. Reviewers noted how easy it was to ski all day long without the discomfort of normal boots, and then clip out and walk normally in the boots off the slopes. It was also noted that system did not function well if one skied backwards, and also failed to transmit fore-and-aft forces that are sometimes used, especially in bumps.

The company hoped that the high price would not be a barrier to skiers who were tired of putting up with sore legs and feet. This did not turn out to be the case. After two years of sales efforts in the US, the Nava system disappeared.

== Description ==
A ski binding has to provide two types of support. One is a locking function that keeps the ski under the boot, but releases when too much strain is placed on the binding (as in the case of a fall). In the Nava System, this was provided by the sole plate and the ski bindings, in the same general way as any modern binding.

The other function transmits sideways motions of the leg, which creates rolling motions around the long axis of the ski. This allows the skier to rotate the ski onto its edge, initiating a turn. With conventional boots and bindings, this is accomplished by using a very stiff plastic cuff locked around the lower leg. When the leg is rotated to the side, the cuff transmits the rotation through the bindings to the ski.

The Nava System eliminated the stiff cuff and replaced it with a stiff plastic covered metal control arm. It extended straight up from the rear of the binding and was topped with a semi-circular cuff that fit the back of the calf. A plastic plate on the back of the boot spread the load onto the calf. When the leg was rotated to the side, the cuff transmitted this motion through the arm to the binding. The boot was eliminated from needing to transmit the forces. Nava claimed this resulted in more direct control.

To enter the binding, the skier rotated the arm rearward, stepped into the binding, and released the arm so it rotated forward onto the calf. When the skier removed the bindings, or fell and was ejected, the arm rotated all the way to the ski. This made the cuff section extend past the bottom of the ski, forming a ski brake.
