= Hexcel =

American materials company

Hexcel Corporation
- Type: Public
- Traded as: NYSE: HXL; S&P 400 component
- Industry: Commercial aerospace, space and defense and industrial
- Founded: 1948; 78 years ago
- Founders: Roger C. Steele; Roscoe T. Hughes
- Headquarters: Stamford, Connecticut, U.S.
- Area served: Worldwide
- Key people: Tom Gentile (Chairman and CEO)
- Products: Composite materials
- Revenue: ▼US$1.89 billion (2025)
- Net income: ▼US$109 million (2025)
- Number of employees: 5,894 (2024)
- Website: www.hexcel.com

Hexcel Corporation is an American public industrial materials company, based in Stamford, Connecticut. The company develops and manufactures structural materials. Hexcel was formed from the combination of California Reinforced Plastics (founded 1948), Ciba Composites (acquired 1995) and Hercules Composites Products Division (acquired 1995). The company sells its products in commercial, military and recreational markets for use in commercial and military aircraft, space launch vehicles and satellites, wind turbine blades, sports equipment and automotive products. Hexcel works with Airbus Group, The Boeing Company, and others. Since 1980, the firm has publicly traded on the New York Stock Exchange under the ticker symbol HXL.

== History ==
=== 1948–1970s ===
Hexcel, originally named the California Reinforced Plastics Company, was founded in 1948 by a group of engineers from the University of California at Berkeley. The company's first contract was for the research and development of honeycomb materials for use in radar domes on military aircraft. In 1954, the company changed its name to Hexcel Products, Inc. The name was derived from the hexagonal cell-shaped honeycomb materials manufactured by the company.

In the 1960s, Hexcel sold aluminum honeycomb and pre-impregnated fiberglass to Hubert A. Zemke and Dave McCoy for use in building skis.

Hexcel expanded from military and commercial aviation to the United States space program. The landing pads on the lunar module Apollo 11 that carried men to the moon in 1969 were built from Hexcel honeycomb materials.

In 1970, Hexcel licensed the ski from McCoy. A few years later, Hexcel decided to focus on its core aerospace business and sold the ski enterprise to the ski boot maker Hanson Industries.

=== 1980s–2000 ===
In the 1980s, Hexcel purchased Stevens-Genin S.A., a French company that manufactured glass-fiber and woven industrial materials.

In 1981, it provided materials for the nose, doors and wings of the Space Shuttle Columbia. In 1986, Hexcel made most of the material used in the fuselage and wings of the Rutan Voyager – the first aircraft to make a nonstop, around-the-world trip on a single tank of fuel.

=== 2000–2024 ===
In 2017, Hexcel was selected by Airbus to supply the composite materials for the H160 helicopter's fuselage structures and rotor blades. Hexcel acquired the aerospace and defense business of Oxford Performance Materials, a manufacturer of carbon fiber-reinforced 3D printed PEKK parts for commercial aerospace and space and defense applications.

In March 2018, Hexcel opened its manufacturing facility at the Midparc Free Trade Zone in Casablanca, Morocco. The facility oversees the transformation of lightweight honeycomb materials into engineered core parts for aircraft structures, engine nacelles and helicopter blades. Hexcel also signed a strategic alliance with Arkema in Colombes, France, to combine work in carbon fiber and PEKK. The alliance will result in a joint research and development laboratory in France. The companies aim to develop carbon fiber-reinforced thermoplastic tapes to produce lightweight parts for aircraft.

Also in 2018, Hexcel opened a carbon fiber plant at the Les Roches-Roussillon Chemicals Industry Platform in Isère, France. The plant is based at the Osiris Chemicals Industry Platform. Hexcel's composite materials were used as part of a new boat design used in the Tour de France à la voile.

In July 2018, Hexcel opened an integrated factory in Salaise-sur-Sanne near Lyon, manufacturing polyacrylonitrile (PAN), the carbon fiber precursor, the second after its Decatur, Alabama plant.

In December 2018, Hexcel announced the hiring of Colleen Pritchett as President - Aerospace, in America.

On May 1st, 2024, Tom Gentile was named CEO following Nick Stanage’s retirement.

== Financial data ==
Annual financials for Hexcel Corp.
Annual Financials	2017	2018	2019	2020	2021
Sales/revenue	1.99B	2.19B	2.37B	1.51B	1.32B
Cost of goods sold	1.42B	1.61B	1.72B	1.26B	1.07B
Gross income	572M	581.7M	650.5M	243.3M	248.9M

The company provides Airbus with over 80% of the carbon fiber it needs and is the main supplier of carbon fiber for Safran, notably for the CFM LEAP fan blades.

Hexcel is creating a new R&D site in Les Avenieres, also near Lyon, focusing on out of autoclave processes, including resin-transfer molding and resin film infusion to target lower production costs for Airbus' future single-aisle family. Using a thermoplastic resin jointly developed with chemicals specialist Arkema, as opposed to thermoset, would accelerate assembly, cut manufacturing costs and lighten structures.

== Acquisitions ==
- 1996 – Ciba Composites
- 1996 – Hercules Composites Products Division
- 1997 – Fiberite satellite prepreg business
- 2017 – Oxford Performance Materials Aerospace & Defense Business
- 2017 – Structil SA
- 2018 - ARC Technologies
