= Spyder (ski apparel brand) =

Ski apparel manufacturer

- Type: Subsidiary
- Industry: Sports
- Founded: 1978; 48 years ago as "David L Jacobs, Incorporated"
- Founder: David L Jacobs
- Headquarters: Headquarters:Boulder, Colorado, United States / European central office based in Baar (ZG), Switzerland
- Area served: Worldwide
- Products: Insulated Jackets, Ski Clothing
- Parent: Authentic Brands Group
- Website: spyder.com

Spyder is an American Colorado-based manufacturer of luxury, high end skiing & snowsports apparel.

== History ==
David Jacobs, Spyder's founder and chairman was born in Montreal, Canada, and began skiing at age 13. At 21, he won the Quebec Kandahar, and from 1957 through 1961 was a member of the Canadian National Ski Team. In 1957 he captured the title of Canadian Downhill Ski Champion, and was the top-ranked member of the Canadian FIS Team the following season. He was the first full-time head coach and program administrator for the Canadian National Ski Team from 1964 to 1966.

In 1978, while Jacobs' sons were in the ski race circuit, he noted that there was only one brand of race sweaters available. He believed he could make a better product and sell it to the close-knit race community. This business, named David L Jacobs, Incorporated, began as a small mail order business in his Boulder, Colorado kitchen.

After the successful introduction of race sweaters, Jacobs added ski pants to the catalog offering. One of the earliest creations was a navy blue racing pant with yellow striped pads extending from the knee to the hip. His son Billy mentioned that skiers were calling them “spider” pants, due to their spider leg-like appearance. Jacobs recognized this as an opportunity to have a powerful, lasting name and logo associated with his products, and renamed the company. A passionate sports car fan, he borrowed the spelling with a “y” from the Porsche Spyder. The early mail order catalogs included race pants, padded sweaters, Vuarnet sunglasses, bent downhill poles and other racing accessories. For two years, Spyder operated out of Jacobs' kitchen. At the end of two years, sales were in the six figures and his kitchen was too crowded.

To finance an expansion in 1980, Jacobs sold the brand to Boulder-based Hanson Industries, a ski boot manufacturer. Eighteen months later, he bought Spyder back before Hanson went bankrupt.

In 1994 Jacobs was granted a patent on SpeedWyre, a technology that enhanced race suit performance. A “trip wire” formed by a narrow seam on the surface of the legs and arms streamlined the surrounding air flow, significantly reducing wind drag by up to 40% in laboratory tests. US Ski Team members wearing Spyder suits enhanced with SPEEDWYRE captured gold, bronze and fifth place in world championships over the next two years, including two World Downhill Championships by Hilary Lindh and Picabo Street. The FIS banned SpeedWyre in 1997, claiming that it gave skiers an unfair advantage.

Spyder is an official supplier to the US Ski Team, a relationship begun in 1989. The Canadian Alpine Ski Team has been outfitted by Spyder since 2002, and the Jamaica Ski Team since 2009.

Olympic podiums gave the brand worldwide presence. Diann Roffe-Steinrotter and Hillary Lindh scored silver in Albertville in 1992. In the 1994 Lillehammer Games, Tommy Moe, Picabo Street, and Roffe-Steinrotter each won gold; Moe and Street also won silver. Bode Miller took home two silver medals from Salt Lake City in 2002. At the 2006 Games in Turin, the Austrian and US Alpine teams collectively captured 16 medals, while Canadian Jennifer Heil won a gold in moguls.

In the late-nineties, a new genre of skiing formed, named Freeski. In 1998 introduced the Kreitler line, eponymous for pro skier Kent Kreitler. That collection became Venom, an apparel collection targeting features, functions, and fashion inherent to the mountain-based, adrenaline-driven freeski lifestyle.

Spyder is the largest ski-specialty brand in the world. In 2004, Apax Partners, a global private equity group, acquired Spyder. Jacobs continued to direct the company as chairman of the board. Jake, his eldest son who penned the trademark spiderwebs, serves on Spyder's board of directors.

The company acquired Cloudveil Mountain Works in 2008. Founded in 1997, Cloudveil manufactures apparel for the outdoor, snowsports, fly fishing and casual apparel markets.

In August 2013 Authentic Brands Group acquired Spyder and licensed it to Li & Fung.

On 29 July 2021, Spyder's parent GBG USA commenced voluntary Chapter 11 proceedings and put its apparel and footwear brands up for sale with help from a $16 million bankruptcy loan.

On February 2, 2025, Liberated Brands, who licensed the Spyder brand, filed for Chapter 11 bankruptcy protection, listing assets and liabilities between $100 million and $500 million.
