= Cable binding =

Type of ski binding

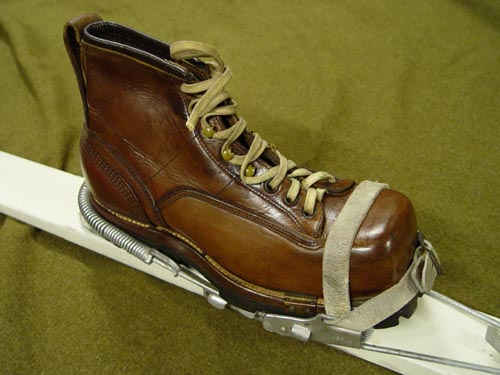
A cable binding with boot, typical of the gear used by the US 10th Mountain Division in World War II and most alpine skiers, including racers, beginning around 1932.

Cable bindings, also known as Kandahar bindings or bear-trap bindings, are a type of ski bindings widely used through the middle of the 20th century. It was invented and brand-named after the Kandahar Ski Club in 1929 by ski racer and engineer Guido Reuge. They were replaced in alpine skiing by heel-and-toe "safety bindings" in the mid-1960s.

The cable binding attaches firmly at the toe only, normally in a trapezoidal metal cup roughly the same as the toe of a boot. A strap is fastened over the toe to stop it from rising out of the cup vertically. Another cable holds the boot forward into the cup, and under the toe strap. If the heel is lifted, causing the boot to rotate in the toe clip, a spring keeps tension on the cable to keep the boot pressed forward.

The Kandahar version added two small metal clips on either side of the boot, normally near the arch or heel. For cross-country skiing the cable was left on top of the clips, allowing the heel to move vertically. For downhill runs, the cable was moved under the clips, forcing the heel down onto the ski. This provided greatly improved control, allowing the skier to torque the skis for turns.

Clipping-in also presents a serious danger, locking the ski to the leg during falls. It was estimated that 10% of all skiers using these bindings were injured during any given season. It was this injury rate that led to the nickname "bear trap", for the way the leg was trapped in the jaws of the binding.

== History ==
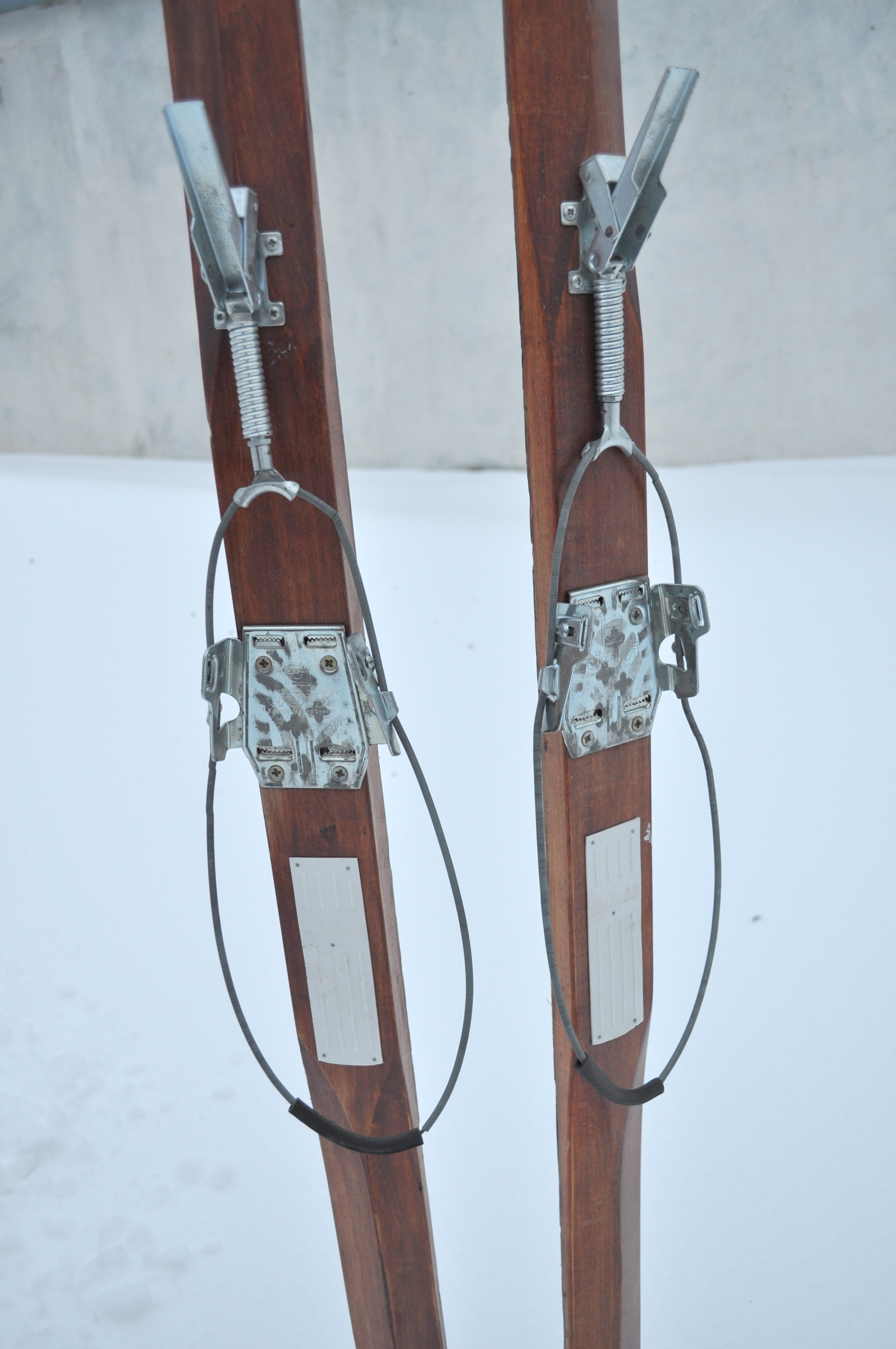
A typical late-model cable binding. The boot is inserted into the metal plate, and held down by a leather strap (missing). The cable is then lifted over the heel of the boot, and pulled forward by the lever at the top of the image. The spring keeps constant tension as the boot moves up and down through the striding motion.

Downhill skiing only developed as a separate sport after the introduction of the ski lift. Prior to this, almost all skiing involved a mix of cross-country, downhill and even uphill skiing. For cross-country, the efficient striding motion requires the heel of the boot to lift from the ski, allowing the leg to lag behind the body as the other ski is moved forward. In the late 1880s, a number of bindings using a leather strap over the toe and a second one pulling the boot forward under the toe strap were common. These kept the toe of the boot on the ski, while allowing the heel to rise some distance.

Fastening the straps to the ski was always a challenge, often requiring slots to be cut into the ski. A key advance was introduced by Fritz R. Huitfeldt, who used a metal plate that was screwed onto the top of the ski with short vertical extensions that had holes to attach the straps to. The major advantage to this design is that the vertical extensions held the boot firmly centered on the ski, whereas the former all-strap systems generally had considerable flop. Variations on this design led to the shaping of the metal plate to progressively hold the toe more firmly.

An evolution of the Huitfeldt designs was the replacement of the heel strap with a metal cable and springs. Invented in 1929 by the Swiss ski racer Guido Reuge, patented by him and marketed in 1932, the spring-loaded cable binding was named for the Lord Roberts of Kandahar Cup ski races. Kandahar-style cable bindings would be almost universal into the early 1960s.

The Kandahar design offered two advantages over the earlier designs. The use of a spring to provide tension allowed fine control over the mechanics, and a smooth action that did not suddenly increase tension at the end of the stroke. It also allowed the skier to adjust the tension by moving the spring or turning a control knob, allowing for different conditions and skiing style and stride. More important was the addition of two small hooks on either side of the ski near the heel. When skiing downhill, the skier could clip the cable under the hooks, locking down the heel and providing much greater control. Now the ski could be turned by rotating the leg, forcing the ski to stem. When it was time to climb back up the hill, the cable was unhooked and returned to being a normal cross-country binding.

The introduction of dedicated ski lifts in the late 1930s led to an evolution of skiing as a sport. In the past, skiers would have to ski or walk up the hills they intended to ski down. With the lift, the skiers could leave their skis on, and would be skiing downhill all the time. The need to unclip the heel for cross-country use was eliminated, at least at resorts with lifts. The cable binding became a must-have. Cable bindings were almost universal by the late-1930s, and used famously by the US 10th Mountain Division during World War II.

For pure downhill skiing, the Kandahar was a problem. In particular, the metal toe clip so tightly clamped the front of the boot that even small sideways motions of the tip of the ski could twist the lower leg, and spiral fractures of the calf were common. The death grip led to the nickname "bear trap bindings", and it was estimated that 1% of skiers suffered an injury on any given day.

During the 1930s it was discovered that an improvement could be made by removing the toe strap from a typical Kandahar binding. Instead, the metal cup was bent inward to slightly wrap over the top of the boot, or at least the top of the sole. Although the resulting clip was much less solid than the strap, in the case of a forward fall the boot would rotate up and out of the cup, releasing the leg. Although this was an improvement, it was a small one.

In the post-war era, the introduction of "safety bindings" replaced the toe plate with more complex auto-release systems, while retaining the heel cable to keep the boot against the toe binding. Over time, the heel cable was replaced with new clip-on binding designs, starting in the late 1950s. By the late 1960s, bear-trap bindings had largely disappeared from the alpine skiing world.
