= Norwegian Institute of Technology =

Former science institute in Trondheim, Norway

- Norges tekniske høgskole
- Seal of NTH
- Type: Public university
- Active: 1910–1996
- Parent institution: University of Trondheim (1968–1996)
- Rector: Sem Sæland (first); Emil Spjøtvoll (last)
- Students: 7,235 (1996)
- Location: Trondheim, Norway; 63°25′10″N 10°24′9″E
- Sporting affiliations: NTHI

The Norwegian Institute of Technology (Norwegian: Norges tekniske høgskole, NTH) was a science institute in Trondheim, Norway. It was established in 1910, and existed as an independent technical university for 58 years, after which it was merged into the University of Trondheim as an independent college.

In 1996 NTH ceased to exist as an organizational superstructure when the university was restructured and rebranded. The former NTH departments are now basic building blocks of the Norwegian University of Science and Technology (NTNU).

NTH was primarily a polytechnic institute, educating master level engineers as well as architects. In 1992 NTH had 7627 master and doctoral students and 1591 employees; it graduated 1262 chartered engineers (master level), 52 chartered architects, and 92 Dr.Ing. (PhD). The operating budget was equivalent to US$100M, and the total premises amounted to around 260,000 m^{2} (64 acres).

Since the merger, it forms a part of the university campus commonly known as Gløshaugen, from the geographical area in which it is situated.

== History ==
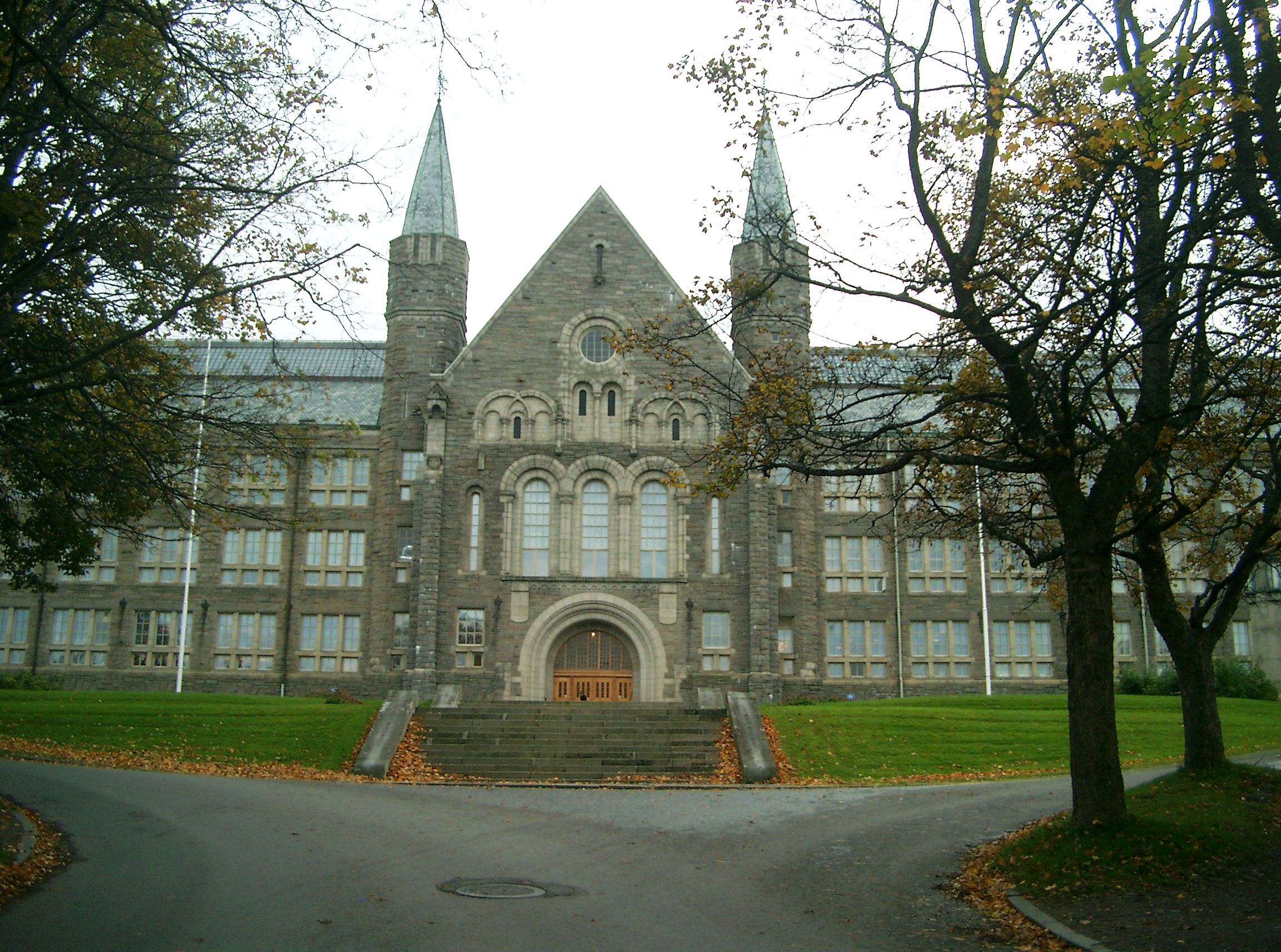
Hovedbygningen, the main building of the Norwegian Institute of Technology (NTH)

The decision to establish a Norwegian national college of technology was made by the Norwegian parliament, the Storting, in 1900, after years of heated debate on where the institution should be located; many representatives felt that the capital Kristiania (now Oslo) was self-evident as the place for this nationally important seat of learning. However, eventually Den Tekniske Høgskole was located in the geographically central city of Trondheim, based on an emerging policy of decentralisation as well as the city's existing and highly esteemed technical college, Trondhjems Tekniske Læreanstalt.

Hovedbygningen, the building of Norges tekniske høgskole was designed by architect Bredo Greve. It was built of granite block construction in the National Romantic style of architecture.

Five academical departments were originally present in the parliament's resolution of 31 May 1900:

- Architecture and city planning
- Civil engineering
- Mechanical engineering (a. General and b. Naval, i.e. ship and ship engine construction)
- Electrical engineering
- Chemistry (a. General and b. Electro-chemistry)

== Academic faculties ==
The academic structure of NTH during the last years before its inclusion in NTNU was as follows:

- Faculty of Architecture, with 5 Departments:
  - Form and Colour Studies
  - Building Technology
  - Architectural History
  - Arch. Design
  - Town and Regional Planning
- Faculty of Applied Earth Science and Metallurgy, with 3 Departments:
  - Metallurgy
  - Geology and Mineral Resources
  - Petroleum Technology and Applied Geophysics (see also Department of Petroleum Engineering and Applied Geophysics)
- Faculty of Civil Engineering, with 8 Departments:
  - Building and Construction Engineering
  - Geotechnical Engineering
  - Road and Railway Engineering
  - Transportation Engineering
  - Hydraulic and Sanitary Engineering
  - Building Materials
  - Structural Engineering
  - Geodesy and Photogrammetry
- Faculty of Electrical Engineering and Computer Science, with 5 Departments:
  - Electrical Power Engineering
  - Telecommunications
  - Engineering Cybernetics
  - Physical Electronics
  - Computer Systems and Telematics
- Faculty of Chemistry and Chemical Engineering, with 7 Departments:
  - Inorganic Chemistry
  - Organic Chemistry
  - Physical Chemistry
  - Chemical Engineering
  - Industrial Chemistry
  - Industrial Biochemistry
  - Biotechnology
- Faculty of Mechanical Engineering, with 6 Departments:
  - Thermal Energy and Hydropower
  - Machine Design and Materials Technology
  - Production and Quality Engineering
  - Applied Mechanics, Thermo- and Fluid Dynamics
  - Heating and Ventilation
  - Refrigeration Engineering
- Faculty of Physics and Mathematics, with two Departments:
  - Mathematics Sciences
  - Physics
- Faculty of Marine Technology, with 4 Departments:
  - Marine Systems Design
  - Marine Structures
  - Marine Hydrodynamics
  - Marine Engineering
- Faculty of Economics and Industrial Management, with two Departments:
  - Economics
  - Organisation and Work Science (Norwegian abbreviation: ORAL)
- Center for Management Education (Norw. abbrev.: ULA)
- Technical University Library of Norway (Norw. abbrev.: NTUB)
  - The national resource library of technology and architecture
  - Locations: Technical Main Library as well as six Faculty Libraries on campus

== Notable alumni ==
- Jens G. Balchen, electronics engr., professor, "father of Norwegian cybernetics", IEEE fellow
- Alf Egil Bogen, electronics engr., co-inventor of Atmel AVR μcontroller, co-founder of Atmel Norway
- Helmer Dahl, electronics engr., World War II radar and ASDIC pioneer, research and industry mentor, technology historian
- David Lie Eide, engineer
- Johannes Falnes, wave energy researcher
- Ivar Asbjørn Følling - chemical engr., discovery of Phenylketonuria, Jahreprisen 1960
- Ivar Giaever, mechanical engr., physicist, 1973 Nobel laureate
- Bjarne Hurlen, mechanical engr., army officer, defence industry executive (Kongsberg Våpenfabrikk 1956–1975)
- Ralph Høibakk, physicist, computer industry executive, mountaineer, adventurer (Seven Summits; South Pole)
- Fred Kavli, physicist, innovator, business leader (sensor technology: Kavlico Corp.), and philanthropist
- Paal Kibsgaard, petroleum engineer, chairman and CEO of Schlumberger
- Arne Korsmo - architect, professor, Norwegian National Academy of Craft and Art Industry
- Olav Landsverk, electronics engr., military weapon systems computer pioneer, professor
- John M. Lervik, electronics engr., co-founder and CEO of cXense, co-founder and former CEO of Fast Search & Transfer (FAST)
- Finn Lied, electronics engr., World War II resistance agent, defence research director, Minister of Industry
- Terje Michalsen, electronics engr., venture capitalist
- Lars Monrad Krohn, electronics engr., industrialist (mini- and microcomputers)
- Ingvild Myhre, electronics engr., telecom industry executive (Alcatel Telecom Norway, Telenor Mobil)
- Lars Onsager, chemical engr., 1968 Nobel laureate
- Venketa Parthasarathy, chemical engr., noted for work on wood pulp and two-stage oxygen delignification
- Erik Rolfsen, architect and city planner for Oslo
- Edgar B. Schieldrop, mechanical engr., student society co-founder, popular science & technology author
- Rolf Skår, cybernetics engr., industrialist (minicomputers), Norwegian Space Centre director
- Einar Aasen Skogsholm, PhD Electrical Engr., VP of MECO
- Øystein Stray Spetalen, petroleum engr., Norwegian investor
- Berit Svendsen, telecom. engr., MTM, CTO of Telenor 2000–.
- Anders Talleraas, mechanical engr., MP for 20 years, former Conservative party parliamentary leader
- Vebjørn Tandberg, electronics engr., industrialist (radio, tape recording, television)
- Theodore Theodorsen, Norwegian-American aerodynamicist
- Leif Tronstad, O.B.E., chemist, nuclear chemistry scientist, planner and organiser of World War II's Operation Gunnerside
- Tor Olav Trøim, marine engr., shipping and energy industry executive (Frontline, Seadrill)
- John Ugelstad, chemical engr., known for his pioneering work on monodisperse polymer beads
- Tore M. Undeland, electrical engr., professor, international textbook author (Wiley), IEEE fellow
- Gjert Wilhelmsen, marine engr., co-founder of Royal Caribbean Cruise Lines
- Bror With, mechanical engr., inventor of the Rottefella ski binding and Dromedille dinghy; World War II resistance agent
- Vegard Wollan, electronics engr., co-inventor of Atmel AVR μcontroller, co-founder of Atmel Norway

== Commercial impact ==
The following companies, or divisions of international companies, have been created directly or partly from NTH research and influence, including its contract research arm SINTEF with spin-offs:

- 3d-Radar AS (advanced ground penetrating radar technology for shallow subsurface mapping in 3D)
- Atmel Norway (inventors and designers of the Atmel AVR RISC microcontroller family, incl HW/SW tools) (in Norwegian)
- Ceetron AS (3D visualization and technical computing for oil & gas, plus aerospace, automotive, and consumer electronics)
- Cybernetica (Norwegian company) advanced process control, specializing in nonlinear model predictive control
- CorrOcean (industrial/off-shore Corrosion Monitoring)
- ErgoRunit AS (outsourcing services in IT system planning/administration and accounting) (N)
- Fast Search & Transfer (FAST) (inter/intranet search engines; developers of alltheweb.com)
- GE Vingmed Ultrasound, formerly Vingmed Sound (ultrasound-based imaging in medical diagnosis and surgery support systems) (N)
- Marine Cybernetics, specialising in the testing and verification of ship and offshore structure control systems (N)
- MARINTEK, The Norwegian Marine Technology Research Institute, including MARINTEK (USA), Inc.
- Nordic Semiconductor ASA (ASIC design, SoCs, RF/mixed-signal hybrid IC's)
- Oceanor (oceanographic measurements and real-time environmental monitoring in oceans, freshwater, and soil)
- Powel ASA (IT products/services for energy production companies)
- Q-Free ASA; formerly Micro Design AS (radio systems for tolling, traffic information, parking, ticketing, access control, logistics)
- Schlumberger Information Solutions Trondheim, formerly VoxelVision AS (3D visualization, mostly for oil & gas applications)
- SINTEF, The Foundation for Scientific and Industrial Research at NTH (contract research corp, 1700 employees)
- SINTEF Energy Research, SINTEF Petroleum Research, and SINTEF Fisheries and Aquaculture ²
- Sinvent Ltd., SINTEFs development and investment company
- Sun Microsystems Trondheim; formerly ClustRa Systems (high-availability, real-time database technology)
- Kongsberg Oil & Gas Technologies AS; acquired Systems in Motion AS (3D visualization software)
