= Look Nevada =

Alpine ski binding

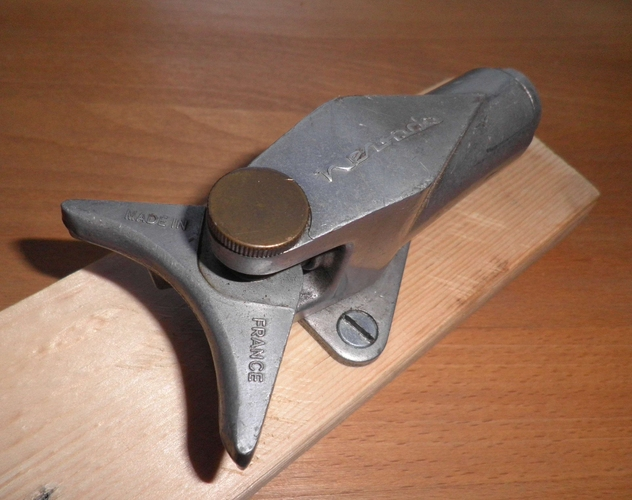
The original Look Nevada toe binding. Early examples, like this model, did not have a standardized flange to clip to on the toe, and the cup area is larger than later models. When boots were better standardized, the cup evolved into two "fingers", but the basic operation remained unchanged to this day.

Look's Nevada, released in 1950, was the first recognizably modern alpine ski binding. The Nevada was only the toe portion of the binding, and was used with a conventional cable binding for the heel. An updated version was introduced in 1962 with a new step-in heel binding, the Grand Prix. These basic mechanisms formed the basis for LOOK bindings for over 40 years, changing mainly in name and construction materials. The Nevada toe pattern is almost universal among bindings today.

== History ==
=== Background ===
In the immediate post-World War II era, most downhill ski bindings were of the "Kandahar" pattern of cable binding. This consisted of a metal cup at the front of the ski that kept the boot centred, with a leather strap buckled over the toe to hold it down into the cup. A long metal cable or spring ran around the back of the boot, over a flange protruding from the heel. The strap held the boot forward and kept the toe in the cup and under the strap. The system was designed to keep the toe firmly in place while allowing the heel to rise off the ski. This allowed for a smooth cross-country striding motion. For downhill use, the cable was clipped down near the heel to keep the boot in firmer contact with the ski, and allow some level of lateral control.

The major problem with these bindings is they did not release in the case of an accident. In particular, if the forward tip of the ski rotated to the side, the force was transmitted through the length of the ski to the boot, forming a huge moment arm. Even small forces could produce torques able to break the ankle or knee, and spiral fractures of the calf were common. This was not as much of an issue in cross-country where the heel was relatively free to move, but in downhill use when the cable was clipped down this was a serious concern. In the 1950s it was estimated that a skier had a 1% chance of suffering an injury on any given day, and that 10% of skiers would suffer a fracture over a single season.

In the immediate post-war era there were a few halting attempts to address this problem. However, most suffered from the problem that the leather ski boots wore down quickly and the mounting point between the binding and boot was thus subject to constant change. Some designs address this by having the user screw metal fixings onto the boot sole to provide a more solid mounting point, but these would only fit a single style of binding. In any event, they required constant adjustment and were often complex. Richard Spademan, inventor of the Spademan binding, would later dismissing them all, stating "Bindings were trash."

=== Beyl's plate ===
French sporting goods manufacturer Jean Beyl made one of the first attempts to solve the twisting fall problem. His design pivoted around a bearing under the foot, in order to ensure that torque did not built up to dangerous levels. Although it did not release the boot from the ski, it did release the force from the boot. To mount it, the boot was fastened to a metal plate, which was in turn cut into the upper surface of the ski in a mortise joint about a centimetre deep. The system was difficult to install, weakened the ski, and also heavy.

Beyl wanted a sexy name for the company, and took one from a US photo magazine. Look was formed in Nevers, France in 1948. The system saw limited sales, but was in use on the French ski team by 1950.

=== Nevada ===
Beyl was a perfectionist and was unhappy with his plate design. What he wanted was a lightweight solution that was easier to mount, yet retained the ability to absorb lateral forces.

His next design used a C-shaped piece that fit over the toe of the boot, eliminating the plate. The toe of a contemporary ski boot is essentially hemispherical, so the single clip kept the boot centred and, by riding over the top of it, pressed down onto the ski. Under a pure sideways release scenario, the clip would rotate to allow the boot to exit. However, if the force was also to the front, as in the case of the ski tip catching a tree root or front of a mogul, the pivot would be too close to the line of motion to allow easy rotation. To address this, the entire body of the binding was also pivoted. In this sort of release scenario, the binding as a whole would rotate, and eventually the force would be far enough to the side that the clip would be forced sideways.

As before, Beyl wanted a US-sounding name for his new binding, and selected "Nevada". The binding was released in 1950, along with a Nevada-branded cable binding of conventional design. The Nevada toe was the first modern ski binding that worked safely with any unmodified boot, eschewing attempts to attach to the sole or use add-on plates or clips. The basic two-pivot design has become universal, and used with only minor modifications to this day.

=== Nevada II and Grand Prix ===
Through the 1950s, Look's only real competitor in Europe was Marker, who introduced their Duplex design in 1952. The Duplex improved on the Nevada by using two clips to hold the toe, rather than a single cup. By locating the clips at the corners of the binding, even falls that created straightforward pressure would cause it to open - the clips would be forced outwards and create sideways forces for the main pivot under the binding. In 1953 was replaced in production by the Simplex, which used a single cup like the Nevada, but retained the action of the Duplex and allowed straightforward release. Look and Marker competed for the majority of the European market through the 1950s and into the early 1960s.

In 1962 Look dramatically updated their line with the introduction of the Nevada II. The new design used a single pivot point under the binding as before, but replaced the rotating cup with two longer fingers. The action to the original Marker Duplex design. However, the use of the two fingers had two effects, for one it allowed a much wider range of boot shapes to be accommodated, and for another, it allowed the boot to travel much further within the binding before it would release. Other bindings with shorter travel were subject to "pre-release", where a short, sharp force would pop the binding even when the movement would not have been enough to cause damage to the leg. This allowed the Nevada II to be safely used at much lower tension settings, improving the chances of it releasing when needed while still preventing pre-release.

At the same time, Look introduced their Grand Prix heel binding. This was essentially one half of a Nevada system, turned sideways so it released vertically instead of to the sides. With cable bindings the heel was normally held down by looping the cable over the heel or cupped it in a semi-circular indentation on the back of the heel. To fit these different styles of binding points, and the fact that the boots had no standardized size or shape, the rotating portion of the Grand Prix was mounted on a bracket that lifted it above the heel flange, allowing the user to adjust its height. The actual binding point was a bronze roller sized to be similar to a standard cable, this could clip on top of the heel, or would fit into the indentation cut into the heel of some boots.

The Grand Prix offered step-in convenience; to put the binding on, the skier inserted their toe under the Nevada II, then stepped down at the heel. The sole of their boot would catch a small plate or rod extending from the bottom of the binding, rotating it until it flipped up to lie vertically behind the skier's leg. During this motion the roller would catch the sole of the boot and lock it into position. Like the Nevada toe, a strong force rotating the boot, this time forward, would cause the binding to release.

=== Further improvements ===
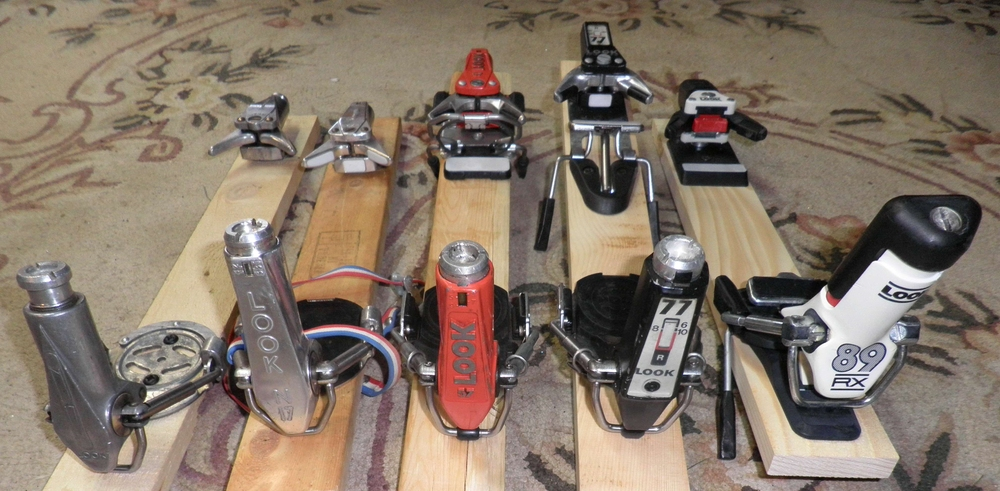
A variety of Look bindings from the original N17 to models typical for the 1990s. The operating principles remain the same throughout, all that changes are the materials and basic layout.

As the value of low-friction devices to aid boot release became clear in the late 1960s, Look modified the Nevada II into the Nevada T to take advantage of the teflon pads that were becoming common in the industry. In addition to a pad on top of the ski under the toe, Look also added a second smaller pad where the very front of the boot pressed under the Nevada's toe clips. The pad was shaped to force the boot sideways in the event of a forward fall, further adding to the forces trying to release the toe.

This basic Grand Prix system was later improved with the addition of a rotating platform under the heel of the boot, known as the "turntable", which stopped the boot from jamming on the heel release's arms when the toe was releasing to the side. These improvements were released as the Look Nevada N17 in the late 1960s. The name now referred to both the toe and heel release as a pair, the separate Grand Prix name was dropped. The N17 was replaced by the similar N57 and N77 from the mid-1970s, which was improved in a number of minor ways, notably the option of a ski brake just behind the toe binding.

The Nevada patents ran out in 1976, a similar models with long-travel toes quickly appeared from other binding manufacturers, starting with Salomon. These replaced earlier designs, which generally used a single cup-shaped piece that fitted over the entire toe flange (as opposed to the toe, as in the original Nevada). These had the disadvantage of requiring careful adjustment to fit the height of the toe flange, and could be impacted if snow on the bottom of the heel lifted the toe upward. Today the Nevada-style "two finger toe" is universal among modern bindings.

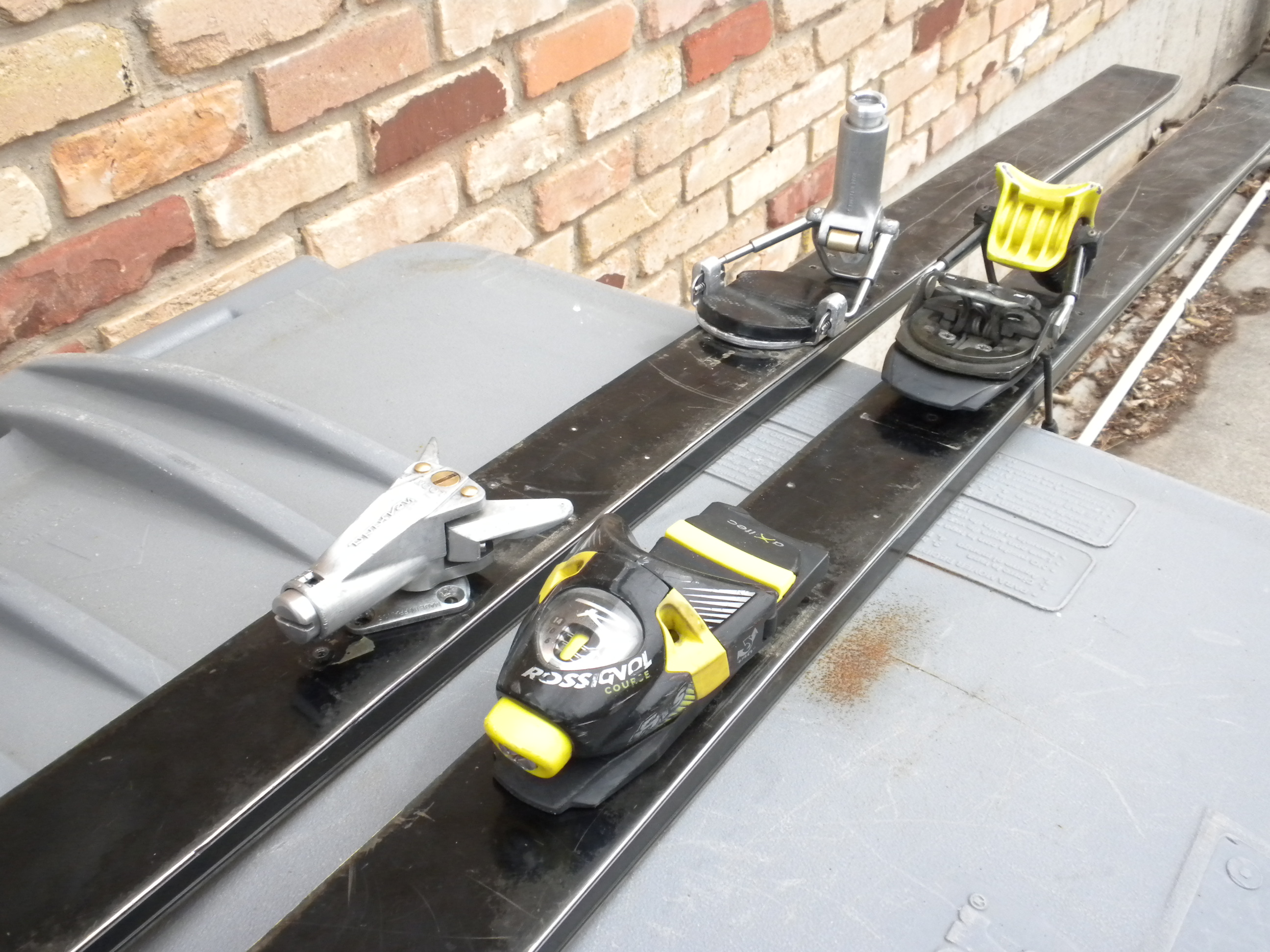
Three decades of Look bindings: On the left is a Nevada II toe and Grand Prix heel, while the right side has a Rossignol-branded version of the 1990s Look Pivot. Both are sitting on a pair of Head Standard skis.

The N77, in turn, gave rise to the 89 and 99, a series of bindings for different skill levels, collectively referred to as the Look Pivot. The Pivot also introduced a button directly in front of the toe under the binding arms. When the boot slid forward along the ski, the boot would press on the button which released tension in the binding and made it much easier to release. This was a further improvement on the series of design changes improving the forward release capabilities of the toe. The ultimate evolution was the XM version, which also allowed the toe piece to rotated directly up, as is the case in a backward fall.

=== Current models ===
Various models of the Pivot were Look's primary offering into the 1990s. When Look was purchased in 1994 by Rossignol, they re-branded the Pivot under their own name. Look-branded versions re-appeared in 2009.

Throughout its long history, Look's only other major binding design was the Look Integral, which was aimed at ski rental shops.
