= Cybernetica =

Cybernetica may refer to:

- Cybernetica (Norwegian company), company developing systems for model predictive control (MPC)
- Cybernetica (Estonian company), company developing systems for Internet voting
- Cybernetica, Journal of the International Association for Cybernetics (Namur), see Cybernetic art

== See also ==
- Principia Cybernetica, international cooperation of scientists in the field of cybernetics and systems science
