= CorrOcean =

CorrOcean ASA
- Company type: Public (OSE: COR)
- Industry: Engineering technology
- Headquarters: Trondheim, Norway, USA
- Area served: Global
- Products: corrosion monitoring
- Parent: Emerson
- Website: www.emerson.com

CorrOcean was a corporation that produces monitoring technology systems related to conventional and subsea oil and gas wells and industrial process piping. The company is headquartered in Trondheim, Norway with offices in Houston, United States and Rome, Italy. In July 2007 CorrOcean merged with Roxar, and continued under the name Roxar.

Systems include detection for corrosion, erosion, sand production, pressure, temperature and flow force related to oil piping and corrosion, cracking, pitting and erosion related to industrial piping.

This company was being purchased by Roxar Asa form Norway and later has been purchased by Emerson.
