= David Lie Eide =

Norwegian engineer

David Lie Eide (21 March 1908 – 30 December 1998) was a Norwegian engineer, best known as the organizer behind the Grieg Hall.

He was a paternal grandson of Johan Wilhelm Eide, the founder of Bergens Tidende and Eide Forlag in Bergen. David Lie Eide graduated in machine engineering from the Norwegian Institute of Technology in 1931 and was hired in Bergens Jernstøberi. Following a period in the resistance movement during the German occupation of Norway, Eide was a candidate for the Liberal Party in the 1945 Norwegian local elections and was elected to Bergen city council. He was re-elected once and served until 1951. In his engineering career, he became managing director of Bergens Jernstøberi in 1941 and chief executive officer from 1948 to 1968. He also chaired the board of Bergens Tidende from 1953 to 1977.

The plans for a concert hall in Bergen, the Grieg Hall, lay dormant after the Second World War, and Eide came to lead the fundraising efforts as well as the construction plans to establish the hall. The outer building was ready in 1970, and the fully equipped concert hall was opened in 1978. In July 1978 Eide was decorated as a Knight, First Class of the Order of St. Olav for his role. He also received honorary tokens from Det Nyttige Selskab and Musikselskabet Harmonien. In late 1998, a portrait of Eide was unveiled in the Grieg Hall. He died shortly after, on 30 December 1998.
