= Look Integral =

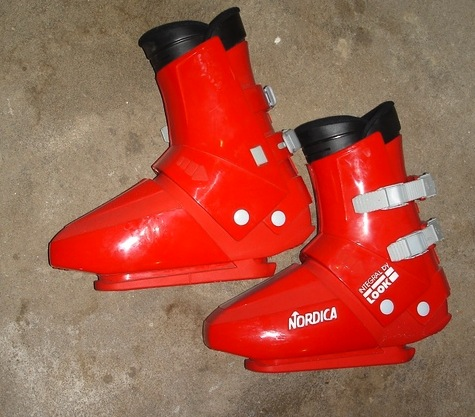
A pair of Nordica ski boots designed for use with the Integral system. The bindings clipped onto the extension on the bottom of the sole. As was typical of the era, the boots are a rear-entry design.

The Look Integral was a downhill ski binding that worked in conjunction with a custom ski boot made by Nordica. The Integral was fairly common in ski rental shops in the 1980s and into the 90s, but has since disappeared.

Conventional ski bindings attach to flanges extending from the toe and heel of the ski boot. These are well-standardized in size and shape, under ISO 5355. However, as they are attached to the ends of the boots, the distance from the toe to heel changes from boot to boot. This requires the binding system to have the ability to move fore and aft on the ski to accommodate different sized boots.

The "Integral system" moved these flanges to a small extension on the bottom of the sole of the boot. This extension was always the same size, so the Integral binding did not have to be adjusted for different sized ski boots. The system was designed for rental shops, eliminating the constant adjustments otherwise needed.

Integral was offered since 1975 in Europe. In North America, Spademan offered a system with similar advantages that controlled the market. When Spademan failed, Integral moved in to replace them. During this introduction, Dynamic Skis also produced a small run of Look-branded skis to go with the package.

Modern conventional bindings have greatly reduced the need for solutions like the Integral. Most bindings now have easy-to-adjust sizing based on a lever that locks into a rack plate on the ski. Others use a rack and pinion arrangement that moves the toe and heel bindings by the same amount by turning a single screw.
