= Look Cycle International =

French bicycle and pedal manufacturer

LOOK Cycle International
- Trade name: LOOK
- Industry: Bicycle Industry
- Founded: 1951; 75 years ago by Jean Beyl
- Headquarters: Nevers, France
- Key people: Bernard Tapie (former owner); Federico Musi (CEO)
- Products: Complete bikes and frames: Road-racing bikes, Gravel bikes, E-bikes, Track bikes; Bike components: Pedals and cycling apparel
- Owner: Activa Capital (majority since 2016)
- Website: lookcycle.com

LOOK Cycle International is a French sports equipment company renowned for developing, designing, manufacturing, and marketing high-end bicycles, bicycle pedals and other cycling components and apparel under the brand name LOOK in more than 80 countries.

The company, headquartered in Nevers, has been a pioneer in the cycling industry since its acquisition by Bernard Tapie in 1983. Notably, the company introduced the first clipless pedal in 1984 and the first carbon fiber frame in 1986.

LOOK Cycle's bicycles and pedals have contributed to victories in all three Grand Tours (Tour de France, La Vuelta, and Giro d'Italia), as well as in most classic cycle races and in Road and Track World Championships. Additionally, athletes using LOOK products have won gold, silver, and bronze medals at the Olympics and the Paralympics and set multiple world records, of which 3 are still standing.

== History ==
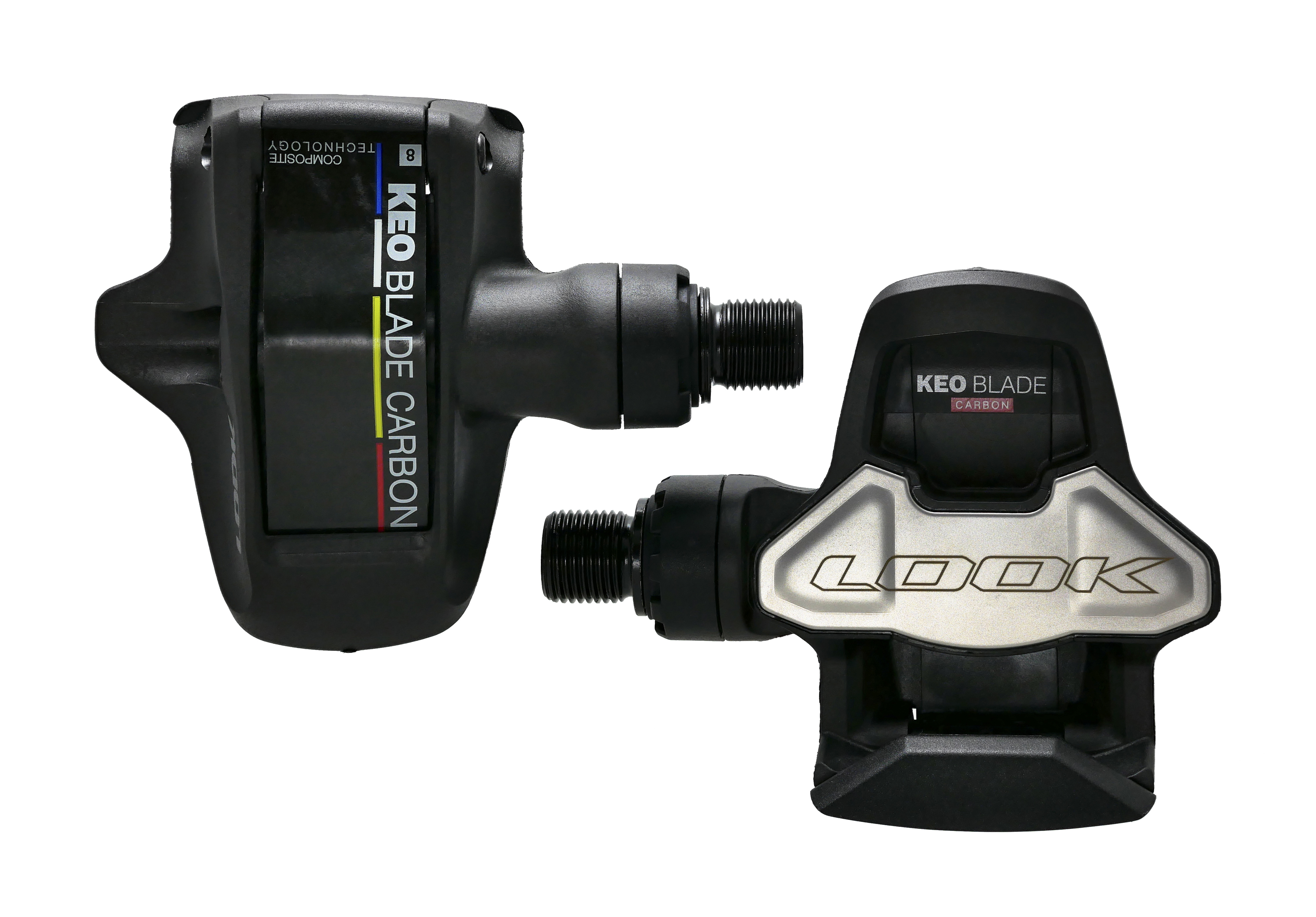
LOOK is best known for clipless pedals which are widely used in road cycling (picture of Look Keo Blade Carbon)

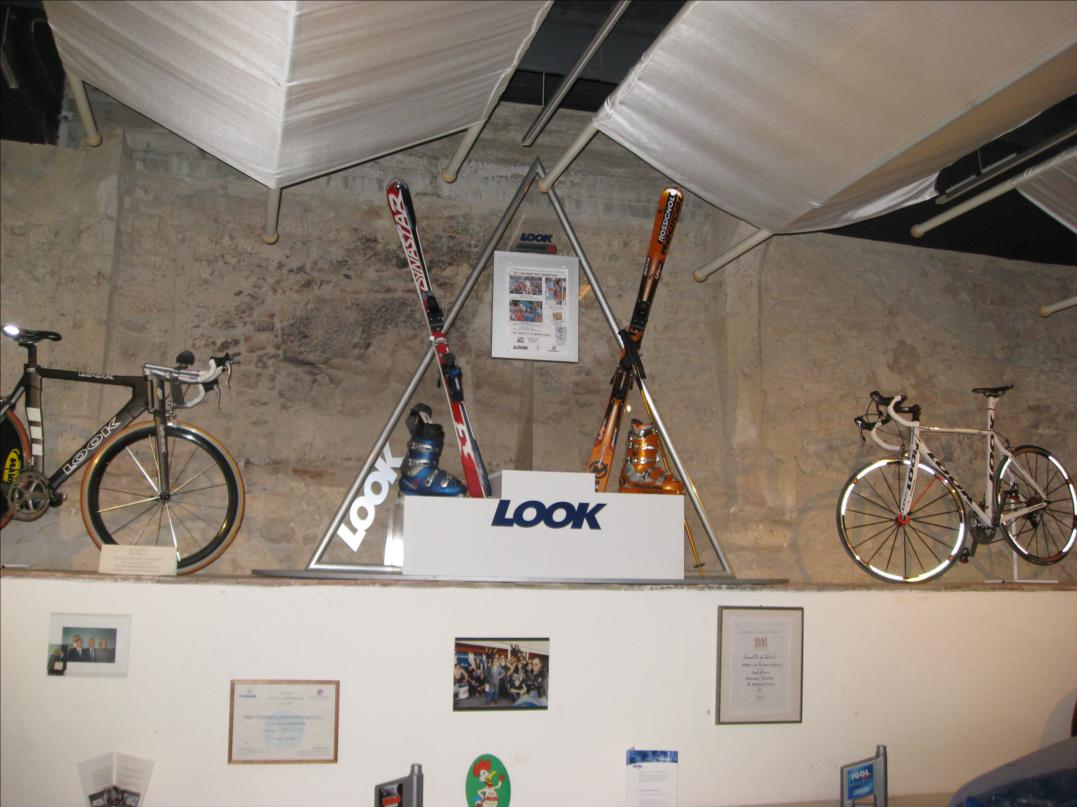
A permanent Look exhibition at the Palais ducal de Nevers in the central French city of Nevers, where Look was founded and is still based

=== Inception of the company ===
In 1950, Jean Beyl invented the Look Nevada dual-pivot ski binding system, which laid the foundation for the company’s future innovations.

In 1951, the Look company was officially founded and named after the American magazine Look. The 1962 Look Nevada II single-pivot ski binding design would significantly influence the company's bindings for the next 40 years.

=== Bernard Tapie's Era (1983–1989) ===
In 1983, after Jean Beyl's early designs of a clipless bicycle pedal, the company was acquired by French businessman Bernard Tapie. At this time, the company adopted its corporate color scheme, inspired by the painting Composition with Red, Blue and Yellow by Piet Mondrian. Many of their bikes feature variations on that color scheme.

In 1984, LOOK introduced the first-ever clipless pedals, the PP65. Simultaneously, Tapie established the professional cycling team La Vie Claire to promote this new product.

In 1985, the La Vie Claire team, led by Bernard Hinault, won the 1985 Tour de France using LOOK's PP65 pedals, marking a turning point in cycling technology. The success of the pedals helped establish clipless systems as a staple in professional cycling. LOOK's pedal designs would go on to inspire rival manufacturers for years.

In 1986, LOOK unveiled the KG86, the first-ever carbon frame, handcrafted with a combination of carbon and kevlar. The frame was first tested in competition at the 1986 Tour de France by Greg LeMond and Bernard Hinault. With this innovation, LeMond won his first Tour, using both the KG96 frame and PP65 pedals

In 1987, LOOK partnered with the FFC to develop high-performance winning track bikes, a collaboration that continues today.

=== The 1990s ===
In 1990, LOOK unveiled the KG196, its first monobloc carbon frame, further solidifying the company's position in innovative bicycle manufacturing.

In 1994, LOOK's ski binding division was sold to Rossignol, allowing the company to focus entirely on cycling products.

At the 1996 Summer Olympics, LOOK achieved its first Olympic success, helping French cyclists win six medals, including four gold.

=== Company buy-out ===
In 1998, a management buyout was led by Dominique Bergin, Thierry Fournier, and Jean-Claude Chrétien. The company was renamed "LOOK Cycle International," reflecting its focus on cycling.

In 2001, LOOK expanded its production capabilities by opening a subsidiary in Tunisia, known as Look Design System, to manufacture carbon frames.

In 2016, Activa Capital became the majority shareholder of the company, along with the management team. Later that year, LOOK acquired Corima, a French manufacturer of high-end carbon wheels for road, triathlon, and track cycling. In 2024, LOOK sold Corima to Pierre-Jean Martin, one of Corima's co-founders.

=== Recent product development ===
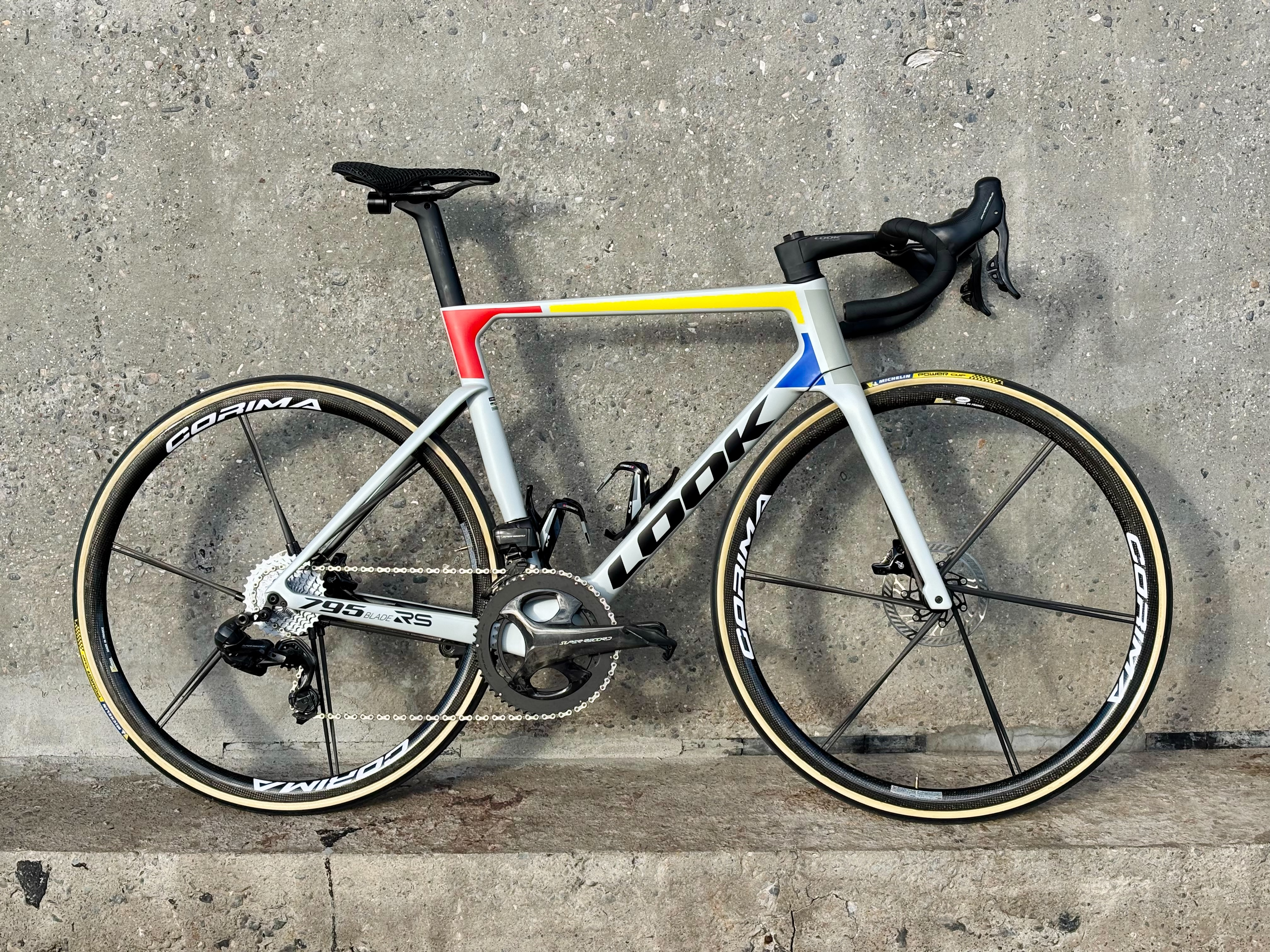
Look 795 Blade RS

In 2004, LOOK launched the KEO pedals.

In 2019, LOOK introduced its first E-bike in collaboration with Fazua.

In 2023, LOOK returned to the Tour de France by partnering with the Cofidis cycling team to promote the 795 Blade RS bike. With this bike, the team achieved two stage wins, marking the end of a 15-year winless streak at the Tour.

In 2024, LOOK launched the LOOK P24 track bike, developed in collaboration with the FFC and athletes, to support the French team at the 2024 Paris Olympics and Paralympics. The bike contributed to winning 7 medals, including 3 gold (Men's Omnium, Women's C5 3000m individual pursuit, and Men's C2 3000m individual pursuit).

== Sponsorships ==
LOOK has been bike sponsor for top-tier professional cycling teams throughout its history, including La Vie Claire, Kelme–Costa Blanca Kelme–Costa Blanca, Gazprom–RusVelo, Crédit Agricole, CSC–Tiscali, Nippo–Delko–One Provence. As of 2024, LOOK is sponsoring Cofidis.

LOOK has also been pedal sponsor of multiple teams and athletes, including Israel–Premier Tech, Movistar Team, Astana Qazaqstan Team, Intermarché–Circus–Wanty, AG2R Citroën Team, Cofidis, Tadej Pogacar, Nairo Quintana, Biniam Girmay and many more.

== Bibliography ==
- Clemitson, Suze (2017). A History of Cycling in 100 Objects. London: Bloomsbury Publishing. ISBN 978-1-4729-1890-1.
- Moore, Richard; Benson, Daniel (2012). Bike!: A Tribute to the World's Greatest Racing Bicycles. The Miegunyah Press. ISBN 978-0-522-86183-9.
