= Bror With =

Norwegian engineer and businessman (1900–1985)

Bror With (19 June 1900 – 9 December 1985) was a Norwegian mechanical engineer, inventor and industrialist. Bror With is perhaps most associated with his invention of the Rottefella ("Rat Trap") ski binding, which he developed in 1927. After victories at the 1928 Winter Olympics in St. Moritz, this binding remained the standard for cross-country skiing over the next 50–60 years.

With was born and grew up in Vestre Aker, Norway. He finished his secondary education at Frogner School in 1920 and graduated in 1925 from the Norwegian Institute of Technology. From the autumn of 1942, With served in Milorg, the Norwegian resistance movement during the Nazi occupation of Norway. He served under the code name Granat-Larsen ("Grenade Larsen"). He was responsible for all weapons and their manufacture. During this time, he produced about 800 units of a local variant of the Sten gun. He showed great ingenuity in camouflaging the real purpose of the manufacture of the various parts for the gun. He had to escape to Sweden towards the end of 1944.

His later major inventions included the Dromedille, a dinghy that combines the advantages of a planing and a displacement hull. The name came from the concept being as difficult as making a cross between a dromedary and a crocodile.

== Other sources ==
- (in Norwegian) Kagge, Stein (1998). Fra Rottefella til Dromedillen: Bror With - et sant eventyr. Oslo: Schibsted. 199 pp. ISBN 82-516-1721-9.
- (in Norwegian) "Oppfinneren Bror With" – Concise biography at the website of the Norwegian Museum of Science and Technology
- (in Norwegian) "Bror With, aristokratiets Reodor Felgen: Bindinger, båter og bomber" ("Bindings, Boats, and Bombs") – Review of Kagge's book, printed in Båtmagasinet monthly

== Related Reading ==
- Beate Muri (21 March 2021) "Med hjertet i halsen for fedrelandet" [Fearing for one's life, in service for the homeland]. Dagsavisen
- Huntford, Roland (2008) Planks and a Passion: The Dramatic History of Skiing (Bloomsbury Publishing) ISBN 9781441118530
