= Cybernetica (Norwegian company) =

Norwegian technology company

- Company type: Private
- Industry: process control, polymer, metal, petroleum industry, Research
- Founded: 2000
- Founder: Dr. Tor Steinar Schei, Prof. Bjarne A. Foss and Dr. Peter Singstad
- Headquarters: Trondheim, Norway
- Products: traditional and nonlinear model predictive control, soft sensors, dynamic process simulation
- Revenue: 12.464 MNOK (2010)
- Number of employees: 12 full-time (2011)
- Website: www.cybernetica.no

Cybernetica is a Norwegian technology company with headquarters in Trondheim, Norway. Cybernetica delivers systems for model predictive control (MPC) and soft-sensing, as well as performing research and problem-solving for hire within the field of process control, for customers within polymer, metal and petroleum industry.

== History ==
Cybernetica was founded on June 29, 2000, by Dr. Tor Steinar Schei, Prof. Bjarne A. Foss and Dr. Peter Singstad. The company grew out of industrial research projects on model predictive control (MPC) conducted at the department for Engineering cybernetics at SINTEF in the late 1990s. The aim of the company was to commercialize the results on model predictive control that grew out of these research projects. SINTEF secured a stake in the newly founded company when it was formed, but the main shareholders were the original four employees.

At the onset, the company decided to focus on model-based control of industrial processes that were either nonlinear systems, batch production or both. For these kinds of processes, traditional linear and empirical model predictive control was considered less suitable. Development focused on developing products which were suitable to nonlinear processes, as well as tailor-making nonlinear physical models for this intended use.

In the late 2000s, the company started work on building a model library written in Modelica and on integrating models from Modelica with their existing tools. This effort was motivated by needs for more complex models in oil and gas applications and by a desire for model re-use and reducing the time and cost of model synthesis.

In the early 2010s, existing tools for fitting models were made more easily accessible for offline model tuning through development efforts in a new product called ModelFit.

Cybernetica holds an annual course on model predictive control through the Norwegian Society for Automation (NFA).

The main clients in the first ten years of the company were Statoil, Hydro Aluminium, Dynea, Ineos, Eramet, Elkem and Arclin (US).

== Products ==
The main product areas for Cybernetica are:

Model predictive control
products to control the settings of industrial plants in real-time with the aim of maximizing throughput or some economic objective, to ensure that process constraints are met or to achieve a more smooth and stable process by rejecting disturbances. At the core of these products are always models custom-tailored for the plant and for use with model predictive control.
Nonlinear model predictive control
an in-house developed suite for nonlinear model predictive control can be applied to control processes with strong nonlinearities and to batch processes, for instance polymer reactors.
Soft sensors
products to infer the value of un-measured variables from measurements by means of combining a plant model with mathematical methods such as the Kalman Filter.
Dynamic process simulation
simulators that are fitted using estimation theory to plant data and are used as process analogs in engineering analysis. These simulators give predictions of transient and dynamic behavior of the plant as well as the stationary responses, and can be used for operator training, "what-if" analysis or bottleneck analysis. These simulators can be implemented to run in real-time in parallel with the process plant as an online model.
