= Marker (ski bindings) =

German company

Marker International
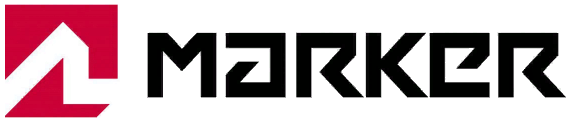
- Type: GmbH
- Industry: Sports equipment
- Founded: 1952; 74 years ago
- Founder: Hannes Marker
- Headquarters: Straubing, Germany
- Area served: Worldwide
- Products: Ski bindings, ski helmets, goggles, sportswear
- Parent: Kohlberg & Co.
- Website: marker.net

Marker International is a German manufacturing company of equipment for winter sports established in 1952 and headquartered in Straubing, Lower Bavaria. Founded by Hannes Marker, the company is known for pioneering releasable binding technology. Marker's first model, the Duplex was followed in 1953 by the Simplex toe binding, which was a huge success in the 1950s. New models introduced in the 1980s were major competitors on the alpine racing circuit.

Marker remained independent until the 1980s, with company ownership switching hands several times before becoming part of the K2 Sports group. K2 Sports in turn was purchased by Jarden in 2007. After Jarden merged with Newell Brands, the corporate group sold Marker and other winter brands to equity firm Kohlberg & Co. in 2017.

The current range of products by Marker include ski bindings, ski helmets, goggles, sportswear and accessories.

== History ==
=== Early models ===
Until the 1950s, the ski industry had used the cable binding, which looped around the entire boot to a lever at the front that provided tension, for all purposes. The "Kandahar" style binding added clips which held down the foot for downhill runs, then released for cross-country striding. Lacking a release system, these bindings could cause serious injuries during even the most minor falls. In the early 1960s, Dr. Richard Spademan had to deal with 150 fractures during a single three-day weekend at Squaw Valley Ski Resort.

During the early 1950s a number of skiers introduced systems to help release the foot in a fall. The most worrying injuries were spiral fractures caused when the ski was forced sideways and twisted the lower leg. In 1950 Look introduced the Look Nevada binding, which allowed the boot to release from the ski at the toe when it rotated to the sides. This was used with a conventional cable binding on the heel.

Hannes Marker introduced the "Duplex" toe in 1953. The Duplex used two small wedge-shaped metal clips that fit over a lug on the boot's toe, holding it down, with a spring keeping the boot centred. During a fall, the clips would be forced outward against their tension, releasing the toe. Like the Nevada, the Duplex used a cable binding for the heel.

In 1953, Marker introduced the "Simplex" system, which used a single metal piece that rotated to either side on a cam plate, allowing the boot to release directly to the side. This was paired with a new "LD" heel, which moved the cable binding lever to the cable itself.

=== Rotamat ===
In 1962, Look dramatically updated their line with the Nevada II toe and the Grand Prix heel binding. The Grand Prix was essentially a toe binding rotated on its side so it released upward instead of to the side, allowing release when the ski caught or was forced up toward the skier. This basic design has remained the basis for downhill ski bindings to this day.

Marker followed Look's lead in 1965, retaining their existing Simplex toe and adding the "Rotamat" heel. The Rotamat placed a release mechanism like the Grand Prix on short cables that ran to the boot's instep. This allowed the boot to release in twisting forward falls, a feature that Look would soon copy in their "turntable" mechanisms. The Rotamat's heel clip could not be easily re-set if it opened, earning it the nickname "explodamat". Several variations of the Rotamat followed, introducing plastic housings for lower weight and other changes to the design.

=== M series ===
In 1972, Marker replaced the Rotamat with its first step-in design, the M4 toe and M44 heel. The M4 re-introduced a two-finger design, allowing the fingers to rotate outward. The M44 heel was relatively conventional, allowing release only directly up. This was replaced in 1979 with the M4-15 Rotamat S heel, which was an improved version of the original Rotamat that was simpler to reset after release. Like the Look designs, it included a turntable under the instep that allowed the boot to rotate to the sides.

A major upgrade was released in 1981 as the M40 Racing series. This is perhaps one of their best known bindings as it was a regular feature on the racing circuit through the 1980s. This featured an updated version of the M4 toe and an entirely new heel piece with a push-button release. Another major update followed in 1985 in the M46. This introduced the Twin-Cam toe and a Salomon-like lever-release heel. This basic design has remained the pattern for Marker bindings to this day.

=== Modern designs ===
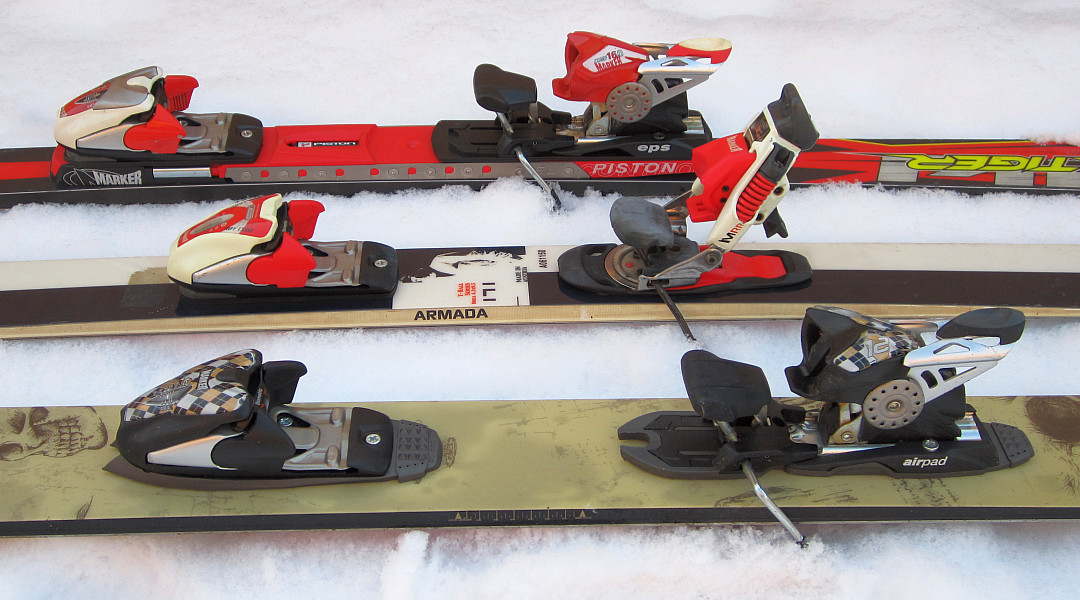
Marker ski bindings from the 1990s to 2000s

In 2007, Marker unveiled a new freeski binding system called the Duke. Complemented by the Jester, the new system redefined the performance parameters for freeride bindings. In 2008, the company released two new bindings, the Baron and the Griffon, that are also based on the Duke system. In 2009, the company unveiled the Jester Schizo, which lets the user switch stances to adjust for a more "park" configuration (more towards the center of the ski) or for a more "all mountain" configuration (back from the core center of the ski). The Royal Family of bindings has become so popular that in 2007, the Duke was the subject of numerous internet scams stemming from people wishing to buy the binding.

Marker has since expanded into the outerwear industry with its Marker Ltd. Apparel line.

=== Bibliography ===
- "About Marker", Marker USA, 2001
- Masia, Seth (March 2003). "Plate Bindings, the Better Mousetrap". Ski Heritage. pp. 39–41.
- "Marker International Signs Letter of Intent". Business Wire. March 8, 1999.
- "MKR Holdings Announces CT Exercises Option". Business Wire. April 2, 2002.
- K2 Buys Volkl, Marker and Marmot for $200 Million, K2, June 16, 2004, FEC filing
