= Virtual sensing =

Virtual sensing techniques, also called soft sensing, proxy sensing, inferential sensing, or surrogate sensing, are used to provide feasible and economical alternatives to costly or impractical physical measurement instrument. A virtual sensing system uses information available from other measurements and process parameters to calculate an estimate of the quantity of interest.

In the field of gas sensors, an array of virtual sensors can substitute electronic noses. Virtual gas sensors can be obtained by using a single sensor working in dynamic mode, i.e., working in repeated cycles that include a customized range of temperature, voltage, or both, which is equivalent to an array of real sensors. The choice of the temperature or voltage range depends on the gas type and its concentration.
