= Spademan binding =

Type of ski binding

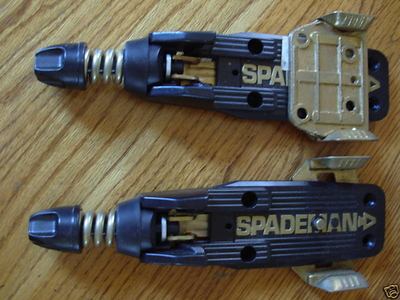
A pair of Spademan S4 bindings, typical of the basic Spademan system for much of its design evolution. The spring on the left pulls on the binding clamps on the right (silver), forcing them towards the center of the binding. The binding plate, screwed to the bottom of the boot, is held in place by these clamps. A plate has been inserted in the upper binding for illustration purposes.

Spademan was a type of ski binding, one of a number of "plate bindings" that were popular in alpine skiing during the 1970s. It used a bronze plate screwed into the bottom of the boot as its connection point, held to the ski by a clamp-like mechanism that grasped the side of the plate. Unlike conventional bindings, the Spademan could release in any direction, in response to any force or torque. It provided greatly improved protection compared to contemporary designs, which generally allowed release of the toe to the sides and heel directly forward, keeping the foot attached in any other fall direction.

The Spademan system became very popular in the late 1970s. Production mis-steps right when new toe-and-heel bindings were being introduced led to a death spiral, and the Spademan system disappeared in the early 1980s. However, the fact that it used a single mounting plate eliminated adjustments for different sized boots, which made it popular in rental shops for some time. The Look Integral was introduced to fill this niche when Spademan exited the market.

== History ==
In 1962, Dr. Richard Spademan took a job at the Tahoe Forest Hospital in Truckee, California. This was just after the 1960 Winter Olympics at the Squaw Valley Ski Resort, and traffic on the hill had increased as a result. In the early 1960s there were a number of quick-release binding systems on the market, but most of them required the user to bolt fittings to the toe and heel. Improperly assembled, or adjusted, these systems failed to release consistently. Spademan would later remark "Bindings were trash. We saw 150 fractures in a three-day weekend."

Studying the problem, Spademan found three problems; bindings didn't release in the directions that caused problems, they didn't release under straight-line deceleration, and the adjustments were too complex. In particular, he noted that any forward fall, even to the sides, would jam the boot into the toe clips. This meant that a forward twisting fall would work against the fundamental action of the binding. Spademan desired a binding that had no toe piece, allowing the boot to slide forward unimpeded. His first attempt to solve these problems clipped to the sides of a plate at the heel, with no toe clip at all. However, this allowed the toe to move about too much, so a new toe clip was added to address this. He then noticed that the key to reducing injury would be to mount the ski over the tibial axis of the leg, below the calf. This would reduce torque on the knee and ankle when the ski rotated under the boot. This led to a new design with the binding mounted under the boot, and from there to the final Spademan design. However, Kansky v. Spademan Release System, Inc, 802 F.2d 440 (1st Cir. 1986), was affirmed in favor of Kenneth Michael Kansky because of a double spiral fracture of non released bindings causing major permanent leg damage to Mr. Kansky before his leg had finished growing.

Conventional bindings clamped onto the flange at the toe and heel of the boot, which were moulded into a roughly rectangular shape. The release action was controlled by cams in the binding, whose limited size limited the cams's size and travel. In the case of the Spademan, the boot plate itself was the cam surface, which gave the designers much more room to work with. Release directions could be adjusted simply by changing the shape of the plate, allowing the binding to release in any direction. This made the Spademan design dramatically safer than conventional systems; rental shops reported 1 fracture per 50,000 ski days with the Spademan, when the average was 1 in 20,000 (these numbers have since improved dramatically).

Additionally, the limited size of the cams in contemporary bindings (with the notable exception of the Look Nevada) had relatively limited free travel to soak up short shocks. This led to the problem of "pre-release", where a binding would release due to momentary pressure that would only cause injury if it was maintained for a longer time (it is not necessarily the force that fractures a bone, but the actual movement). In the case of the late model S series, the binding could move as much as 30 mm before releasing.

During his residency at Stanford University, Spademan had designed a new type of inter-vascular catheter. By the mid-1960s this was in production and increasingly widespread use. He used the royalties from the catheter to start prototype production of his binding. Driving to every ski resort in range with a few hundred pairs of bindings, he finally convinced some ski patrollers at Squaw Valley and Boyne Mountain to try them out. Most broke immediately. This led to further design improvements, and eventually to a 1969 production run of 1000 pairs of bindings from the newly formed Spademan Release Systems, Inc. Continual improvements followed to allow the binding to hold more strongly, and by the winter of 1974/75 the binding was a must-have on the pro freestyle skiing circuit.

Richard Whitaker and David Stuart then introduced a key improvement to the system. Early versions of the Spademan required the skier to clamp the binding onto the plate by tightening the spring with the rotating nut. Whitaker and Stuart suggesting having the spring on an arm that rotated upward, positioned over a cam at the rear of the binding. When the arm was rotated up, it would slide off the top of the cam and release all the tension. It could then be re-tensioned onto the plate by pushing the spring back down onto the cam. Spademan later further improved on this design, adding a latch to keep the clamp arms open. In use, the skier would remove the binding as normal by lifting the spring off the cam, but could then return it immediately to the "clamped" position. The latch kept the clamps open until a small button under the binding plate was depressed, which happened when the skier stepped back into the binding. This gave the Spademan "step in" performance, which previous models lacked.

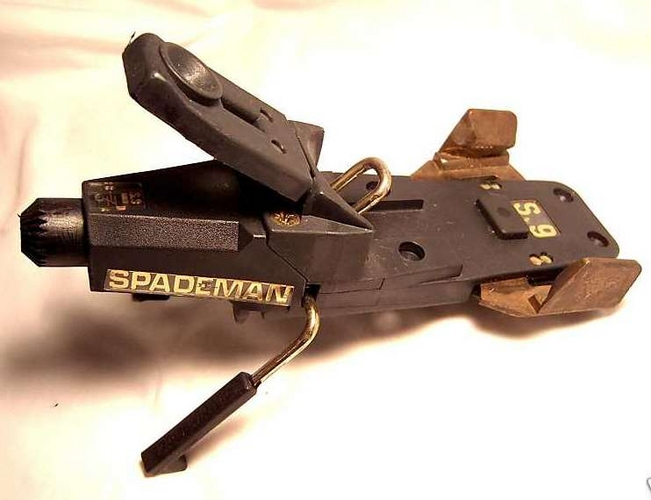
The Spademan S9 binding, one of very few produced. The basic concept is the same as earlier models, but the spring tension is now released by pressing down on the large lever on top of the binding. This is typically done with the ski pole, eliminating the need to bend over to step out. The S9 also added a ski brake, which by that time was a standard feature of all downhill bindings.

The widespread introduction of plastic boots in the 1970s changed the market considerably. Now the required attachment points for toe-and-heel bindings could be moulded right into the boot, eliminating the problems when users screwed on their own attachments. These entered a market in the 1970s where plate-type bindings, including Spademan, held roughly half the binding market. In 1978 Spademan had excellent sales and was by far the best selling US binding design.

A dramatically improved model was being introduced for the winter, the S-2/S-3/S-4 lineup, that greatly increased "free travel" within the binding in order to prevent pre-release. Betting on large sales, Spademan moved the factory from San Francisco to Lake Tahoe. The bindings were made of cast aluminum, and the moulds were delivered months late. Both of these changes conspired to slow production, and many shops did not receive stock until well into the season. Sales plummeted, and the rapid take up of toe-and-heel bindings for the now universal plastic boots meant they never recovered. The S-9 model introduced true step-in-step out performance, but by the time of its release sales were moribund. Spademan eventually returned to practicing medicine.

Rapid standardization among boot vendors meant that bindings manufacturers had a known flange to clip onto, and through the late 1970s conventional toe-and-heel bindings dramatically improved. Users could buy any model of boot and use it with any model of binding, whereas with the Spademan the boot had to be "prepared", if it could be. It was not uncommon for boots to have cut down areas under the midsole, so there was not enough room for the plate to be mounted. Even if the plate fit, boots were not generally designed for mounting under the midstep, and it was not uncommon for the Spademan plate to pull out of the sole. Even then, the addition of the plate might render the boot unusable on a ski with traditional bindings. This led to the introduction of the Spademan 900 boot, but it was withdrawn after only a year.

The Spademan had a number of operational disadvantages as well. As there was no space below the binding plate, even small amounts of snow clinging to the bottom of the boot could make it difficult to fasten properly. A very thin film of snow was even worse; it was possible to close the binding with the plate slightly above its normal rest position, which pre-tensioned the clips and made it much easier to release unexpectedly. The plate itself was also quite slippery (the reason bronze was used) which made walking somewhat difficult and also wore down relatively quickly. Removing the binding also required it to be reset, so the system was much less automatic than contemporary designs like the Salomon 727.

The Spademan system retained one major advantage over the toe-and-heel binding, due to the universal plate. When changing boots, normally one would have to adjust the bindings fore-and-aft to accommodate a change in boot length, but with the Spademan this was not an issue because the plate was always the same size and shape. This made them popular in rental shops, where they lived on into the mid-1980s. The company also sold clip-on full-length plates for people who wanted to use rental skis with Spademan bindings with their own boots, lacking the butterfly. The plate had metal loops that clipped over the toe and heel, with a small lever on the back to allow it to be tensioned onto the boot, and a well-fastened butterfly on the bottom.

== Description ==
The Spademan system consisted of a single hollow binding that sat on the ski under the middle of the boot. In the middle of the hollow were two bronze clips that were pivoted near the rear of the binding, so that rotation around the pivot point moved the clips sideways towards the middle of the binding. An T-shaped arm ran between the clips to cam-shaped indentations on the clips. When the arm was pulled rearwards, it pulled on the cams and rotated the clips inward. The arm was attached to a spring at the rear of the binding that provided constant rearward tension, pulling the cams, and holding the clips in the closed position. On the bottom of the boot was a bronze plate shaped like a butterfly or hourglass. When the clamps were tensioned onto the plate, bumps on the clamps fell into indentations on the sides of the plates, positioning and rotating them correctly. Bronze was used to prevent metal-on-metal lockup in the wet conditions they faced.

To fasten the binding, the spring assembly was lifted, sliding on a plastic disk. After being raised slightly it could move forward, releasing all tension on the clips. A metal clip prevented it from moving under the boot area, while also acting as a mounting spot for a safety strap. The boot could then be forced onto the angled upper area of the clips, forcing them to open outward, and then fastened by pushing the spring back down to re-apply tension. Step-in action in the S-2/3/4 series was accomplished by a small spring-loaded pin catch on the cams. When the spring assembly was lifted, the pin was forced upward into a hole on the T-arm running to the spring, holding it forward. When the skier stepped in, the pin would be pushed down and release the arm, springing the clips closed. The S-9 model improved on this using a large lever over the spring assembly that released spring pressure by pushing the spring forward when it was pushed down with a ski pole. The lever also had a finger that pressed up on the sole of the boot, helping it pop open the clips. This gave the system true step-in, step-out behaviour.

Automatic release was accomplished by forcing the clips sideways, against the tension of the spring. The shape of the clip and the plates meant that rotating the boot in relation to the ski would force them outwards. For instance, in a twisting motion the plate would push the clip sideways along the edge of the plate until it reached the corner, when it would release. In a direct-forward fall, the plate would lift up, acting against the angled shape of the clips, again forcing them outward and eventually releasing. The tension could be adjusted for skier weight or skill level via a large screw knob at the extreme rear, and several springs were provided for different release forces.

Appearance in Media:

Spademan ski bindings played a small part in the 1977 James Bond 007 movie, "The Spy Who Loved Me." In the opening sequence, James Bond being pursued by armed gunmen, all on snow skis. James Bond is shown skiing off the edge of a tall cliff, shedding his skis, and deploying a parachute. This ski-BASE was performed by stuntman named Rick Sylvester. In later interviews, Rick Sylvester recounted he used Spademan ski bindings because they could be released in zero gravity, unlike nearly all other types of ski bindings available during that era.
