= Burt Retractable Bindings =

Alpine ski bindings

Burt bindings are plate-style alpine ski bindings invented in the 1970s by Burton A. Weinstein. Their unique feature was retractable cables that would pull the ski back onto the binding in the event of a fall.

The binding consisted of a metal plate that was attached to the bottom of the ski boot using a metal wire that slipped over the toe flange, and metal fingers over the heel flange. The fingers were attached to a metal box that ran vertically above the plate and was connected to the plate by a hinge. In later versions, the plate could be removed by pushing the box down and rearward with a ski pole, rotating it rearward so the fingers slipped off the heel flange. It could be re-attached to the boot by stepping down on the plate, causing the box to rotate forward again.

The interior of the box contained a spring-loaded steel cable, and the plate under the foot another. The rear cable connected to a small metal bracket that was screwed onto the top of the ski. Small plastic wheels on the bottom of the plate sat in indentations on the rear connector, allowing the boot to roll forward and release. Similar wheels at the toe were rotated to allow sideways motion. The toe cable attached to a similar connector at the front, which was designed to rotate to allow the boot to release.

In the case of a binding release, the cable prevented the ski from running away down the hill, a task normally accomplished at that time with a separate strap tied around the skier's leg, and today with a ski brake. The spring would then automatically pull the ski back to the user and, if properly aligned, reconnect it.

The system, like all plate bindings, had a number of disadvantages. For one, snow would stick to the metal parts, which made it difficult to re-attach the ski. The system also had the potential to snatch clothing and fingers as it re-connected. It also had a reputation for easily breaking.

The company was purchased by Garcia Corporation to fill out their skiing portfolio which included Lange boots and Dynamic skis. Garcia went bankrupt in 1978, and the various divisions were sold off. Rossignol took over Lange, but the Burt product disappeared during this period.
