= Soft sensor =

Software where several measurements are processed together

Soft sensor or virtual sensor is a common name for software where several measurements are processed together. Commonly soft sensors are based on control theory and also receive the name of state observer. There may be dozens or even hundreds of measurements. The interaction of the signals can be used for calculating new quantities that need not be measured. Soft sensors are especially useful in data fusion, where measurements of different characteristics and dynamics are combined. It can be used for fault diagnosis as well as control applications.

Well-known software algorithms that can be seen as soft sensors include Kalman filters. More recent implementations of soft sensors use neural networks or fuzzy computing.

Examples of soft sensor applications:

- Kalman filters for estimating the location
- Velocity estimators in electric motors
- Estimating process data using self-organizing neural networks
- Fuzzy computing in process control
- Estimators of food quality

== See also ==
- Virtual sensing
- State observer
