= Rottefella =

Norwegian sports equipment company

Rottefella A.S.
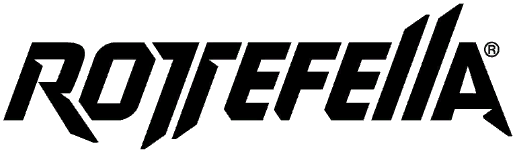
- Type: Private
- Industry: Sports equipment
- Founded: 1927; 99 years ago
- Founder: Bror With
- Headquarters: Klokkarstua, Norway
- Products: Ski bindings
- Number of employees: 35 (2026)
- Website: rottefella.com

Rottefella is a Norwegian manufacturing company of winter sports equipment, more specifically ski bindings. The name "Rottefella" refers to the three-pin binding invented by Bror With in 1927, inspired on a couple of rat traps he had seen in a hardware store. The binding were more formally known as the "75mm Nordic Norm".

The binding was the standard for cross-country skiing for decades. Rottefella also produces binding systems that have largely replaced the 75mm, the NNN (or New Nordic Norm) and NNN-BC (backcountry version).

== Sponsorships ==
Some skiers who ski on Rottefella bindings include:

- Ole Einar Bjørndalen
- Kati Wilhelm
- Julija Tchepalova
- Halvard Hanevold
- Hilde Gjermundshaug Pedersen
- Olga Zaitseva
- Kateřina Neumannová
- Magnus Moan
- Kris Freeman
- David Chamberlain
- Andrew Johnson
- Leif Zimmerman
