= Ski binding =

Device that connects a ski boot to the ski

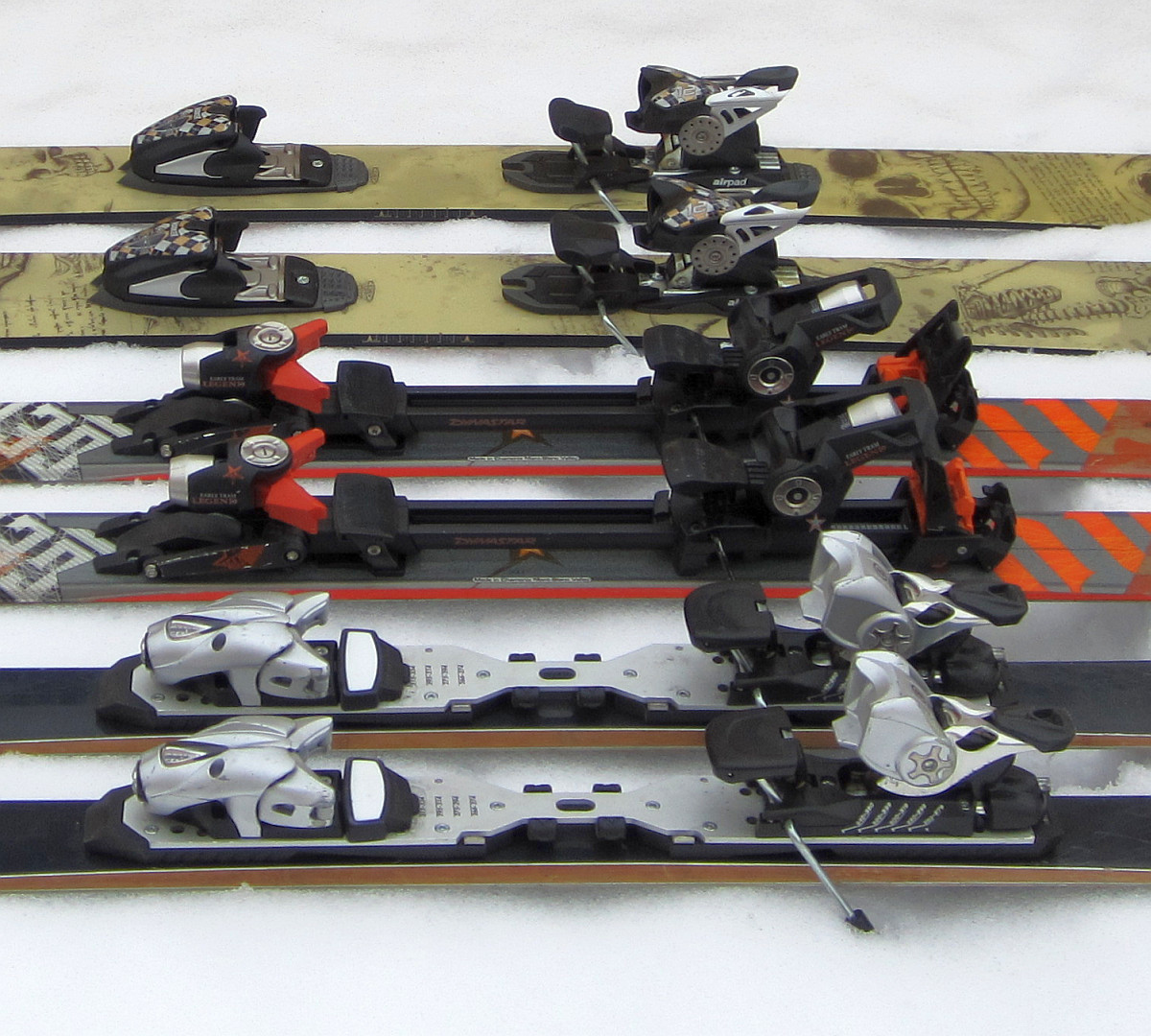
Alpine step-in ski bindings

A ski binding is a device that connects a ski boot to the ski. Before the 1933 invention of ski lifts, skiers went uphill and down and cross-country on the same gear. As ski lifts became more prevalent, skis—and their bindings—became increasingly specialized, differentiated between alpine (downhill) and Nordic (cross-country, Telemark, and ski jumping) styles of skiing. Until the point of divergence in the mid-20th century, bindings held the toe of a flexible, leather boot against the ski and allowed the heel to rise off the ski, typically with a form of strap or cable around the heel.

To address injuries resulting from falls while skiing downhill on such equipment, ski bindings emerged with the ability to release the toe of the boot sideways, in early models, and to release the boot forward and aft, in later models. Downhill ski bindings became standardized to fit plastic ski boots and incorporated a built-in brake that drags in the snow after the ski detaches from the boot.

Cross-country ski bindings evolved from being simple, bent-metal attachment plates with pins, which held a square-toed leather boot toe under a wire bale, to becoming standardized systems that held a plastic boot, attached to a bar in a recess in the boot's toe.

Back-country, jumping, and alpine touring ski bindings incorporate features found in alpine and Nordic bindings.

== History ==
Prior to the 1840s, ski bindings were a leather strap fastened over the toe of the boot, similar to those used for snowshoes.

=== Norheim—ca. 1850 ===
Sondre Norheim demonstrated telemark skiing before 1866, and the Open Christiania turn in 1868, both made possible with a binding design which dated back to the late 1840s. This added a loop of twisted birch roots that ran from the existing birch root toe loops around the boot heels and back. This allowed the heel to lift as before, for walking and gliding, but better held the boots to the skis allowing greater control. This enabled Norheim to control the skis with his feet and legs, replacing the former technique of dragging a large pole in the snow on one side or the other to drag the skier in that direction. This control led to the development of the telemark and stem christie ski turns.

=== Huitfeldt—1894 ===
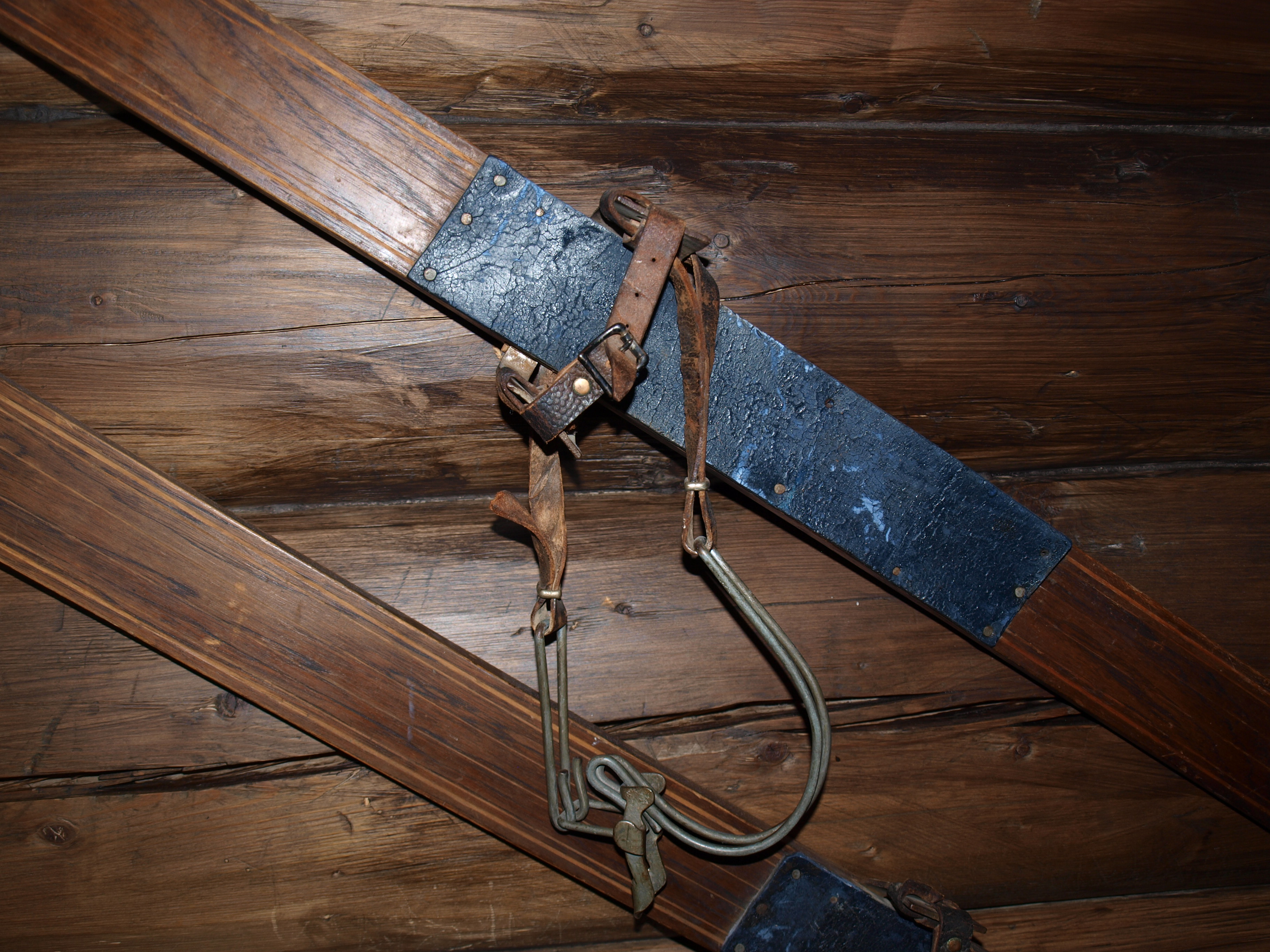
A late model Huitfeldt-style binding. The toe clip runs through the core of the ski to bend up on either side. This model uses a metal heel strap with a lever buckle instead of an all-leather design.

Starting in 1894, Fritz R. Huitfeldt invented a binding with a secure toe iron which allowed the heel to move freely and evolved through the 1930s as the standard design. His innovations included:

- Adding vertical metal brackets on either side of the ski to hold the ski boot (1894), augmented in 1897 by passing the iron bracket through a rectangular hole from one side of the ski to the other, before bending up the tabs.
- Passing toe straps through the rectangular hole and providing a buckle over the top of the boots, attached to the brackets and firmly bind the boot in place.
- Passing a strap over the free heel, augmented in 1904 with a cam lever substitute for the buckle over the heel, called the "Hoyer-Ellefsen toggle".

Skiers wishing to affix their heel to the ski, employed a "long-thong" strap. Further innovations included:

- Mathias Zdarsky's development of a ski binding that replaced the heel strap with a long metal plate under the sole of the boot, hinged at the front to allow the heel to rise, in the early 1900s. The heel was held to the plate by a short strap attaching at the back.
- Marius Eriksen's 1920 introduction of pre-formed plates that were screwed on top of the ski.
- Guido Ruege's 1929 invention of the Kandahar binding, which incorporated a front-throw lever that tightened the heel cable past the ski-mounted toe brackets and became known as the cable binding.

=== Rottefella—1927 ===
The Rottefella binding was developed in 1927 by Bror With. "Rottefella" means "rat trap" in Norwegian. A bent, pressed-metal plate had three or four pins that stuck into the toe of a square-toed boot, which was clamped down with a metal bail. After victories at the 1928 Winter Olympics in St. Moritz, the binding remained the standard type for cross-country skiing through much of the century and continues as the Nordic Norm, manufactured by Rottefella and other companies.

=== Cable—1929 ===
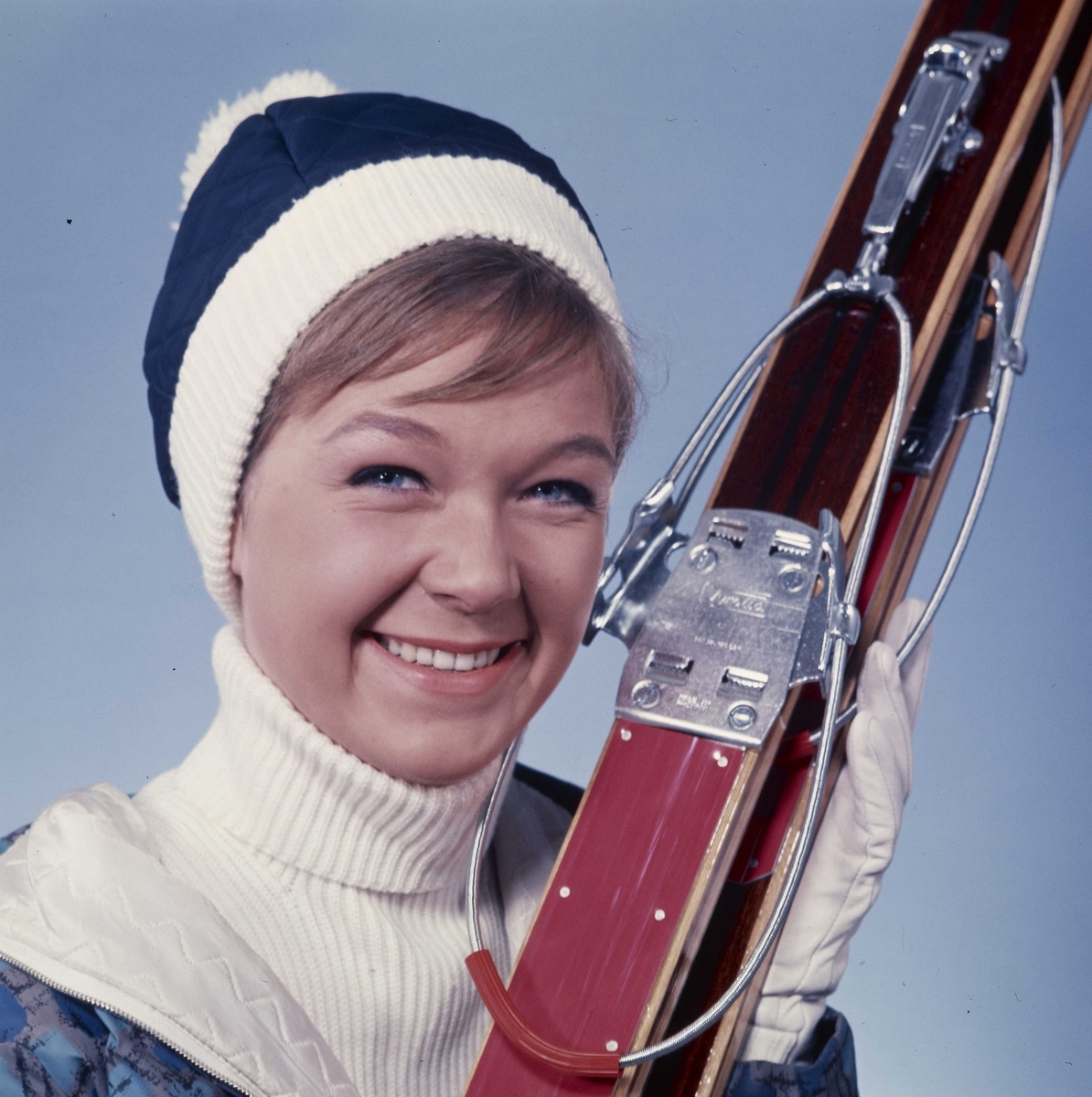
Cable binding

The introduction of the cable binding allowed the Christie turn to become a standard on downhill runs, and to further support this style of skiing the Swiss racer Guido Reuge in 1929 invented a cable binding with steel clips below the boot heel to enable clamping the heel down for downhill portions. He named the product "Kandahar" for the international Kandahar Cup ski races. In use in alpine races, the Kandahar binding led to serious leg injuries, and by 1939 experimentation began in earnest on bindings that would release the boot in a fall.

=== Saf-Ski—1937 ===
Hjalmar Hvam broke his leg skiing, and while recuperating from surgery, invented the Saf-Ski toe binding in 1937, which he later sold under the slogan "Hvoom with Hvam". This was a metal clip with a pyramidal top that fit into a slot cut into the sole of the ski boot. When the boot was rotated forward, the slot on the toe eventually rose above the metal pyramid, allowing the toe to release from the ski. The system was considered with suspicion by professional skiers, especially when Olaf Rodegaard released during a race. However, Rodegaard credited the release with saving him from a broken leg. In the post-war era, Hvam sold several thousand pairs of Saf-Skis, in an era when alpine skiing was in its infancy. Hvam continued to sell the Saf-Ski into the 1960s, but in 1966 his insurance rates increased so dramatically that he was forced from the market.

=== Look Nevada—1950 ===
The introduction of the Look Nevada in 1950 represented a significant advance in ski bindings. The Nevada held the toe centred over the ski using two metal fingers shaped into an upside-down V. The fingers were pivoted to allow motion to the sides, and centred with a spring. During a fall, sideways torsion could overcome the force of the spring and allow the boot to release directly to the side. This design was quickly copied by other vendors, notably Marker, and had the first real impact on the dominance of the fixed-toe bindings. By the late 1950s, there were about 35 different release toe bindings on the US market, most of which used a normal Kandahar-style heel cable.

=== Cubco—1950 ===
The first modern heel-and-toe binding for alpine skiing was the Cubco binding, first introduced in 1950 but not popular until about 1960. A heel-release binding faced the problem that there was no obvious place to attach to on the heel, so the Cubco solved this by screwing small metal clips into the sole of the boot. This also eliminated the changes in performance as the sole of the boot wore down, or the geometry of the sole changed as the boot wore into the skier's foot.

=== Heel-release—1960s ===
Marker introduced the Rotomat, which gripped onto the sole where it extended past the heel, and Look quickly followed suit with their Grand Prix design. By the mid-1960s, release bindings that worked on both the heel and the toe were common, and by the late 1960s, the cable binding had disappeared from alpine skiing.

=== Plate systems—1970s ===
One problem with 1960s release bindings was that the boots were not standardized, and a binding that worked well on one boot might be dangerous on another, or might become dangerous over time as the boot shifted about. This led to the introduction of plate bindings, which used a metal plate firmly clipped to the sole of the boot, and bindings that clamped onto the plate. The plate could be easily removed for walking about. Plate bindings were popular in the US in the 1970s, notably the BURT Retractable Bindings and Spademan binding, but never caught on in any major way in Europe. As more and more of the alpine skiing market came under control of European companies, the plate bindings disappeared, in spite of their excellent safety records.

=== Standardized plastic boot-compatible systems—1970s ===
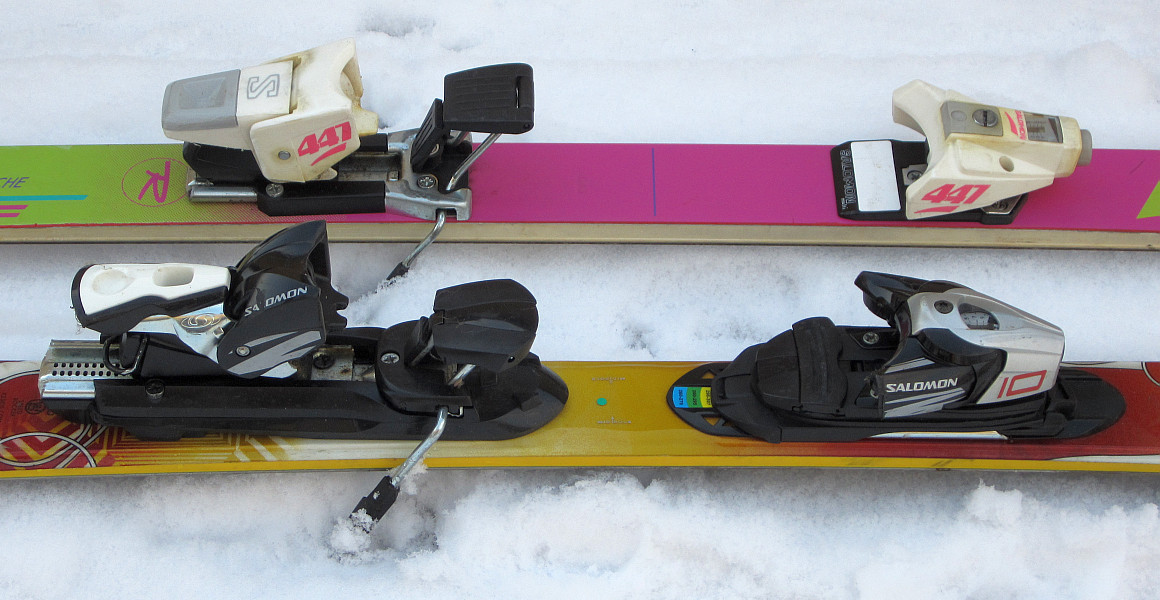
Alpine ski bindings, featuring integrated ski brakes and step-in-step-out heels (ca. 1980s, behind, 2010s, in front).

The disappearance of the plate and alternate systems was due to a combination of factors, notably the introduction of standardized hard plastic boots. Plastic was first introduced by Lange as a way of improving existing leather designs. As the new material spread through the industry, the sole piece was standardized to allow toe-and-heel bindings to clip on. Plastic had the advantages of being much firmer than leather, not changing shape over time, and having predictable friction characteristics wet or dry.The new boots and bindings could be easily adapted to any ski for any skier. Injury rates from alpine skiing began to fall with the gradual introduction of the Teflon anti-friction pad around 1972.

== Alpine ==
Alpine ski bindings have two functions: 1) Retaining the ski boot on the ski, 2) Releasing the ski boot from the ski in case of a fall to prevent injury to the skier. The retention function typically involves stepping into the binding toe-first and pressing down with the heel of the ski boot, which causes a latch to engage the heel. The release function has two principal axes of operation: forwards and back along the ski and torsionally, rotating over the top of the ski. Bindings allow a certain amount of flexure of the boot position before they release under pressure during a fall.

Each binding is set for a DIN value that determines how readily it will release in case of a fall, based on the parameters of the skier's height, weight, age, and ability (rated from one for beginner to three for an advanced skier). A snow brake prevents the ski from moving while it is not attached to a boot. Major manufacturers of alpine ski bindings include:

- Atomic, (also branded "Ess") pioneered the adjustable binding platform, forwards and back.
- Geze, which pioneered upward release of the toe, in case of a backwards fall.
- Look, which pioneered a turntable for the heel.
- Marker, which pioneered the toe-piece "twin-cam" articulation for releasing a boot sideways.
- Salomon, which pioneered the use of composite plastics in bindings.
- Tyrolia, which introduced the "flex" attachment system, using pins on the binding that engage holes in the boot.

=== Alpine touring ===
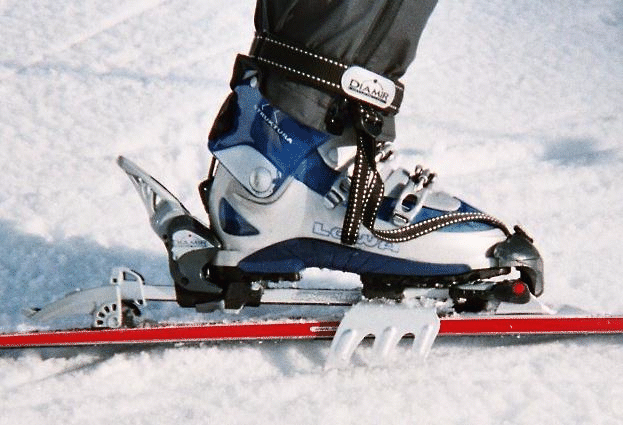
Alpine touring ski boot, binding, and ski crampon

An alpine touring (or randonee) binding allows the skier to have the heel of the ski boot free and the toe of the ski boot in the binding when using Nordic skiing techniques for ski touring, and to have both the heel and the toe of the ski boot in the binding when using alpine skiing techniques to descend the mountain. Most touring bindings are designed for ski boots falling under one of two ISO specifications:

- ISO 5355:2019, for traditional alpine boots. In this variation the pivot is located in the front of the binding.
- ISO 9523:2015, for boots in which the pivot is formed at the boot / binding interface.

The two setups are typically incompatible in that the principle by which they affix the boot to the ski is different. "Tech" bindings engage the ski boot with pins, which hold the toe down and engage with the heel in downhill mode. Approximately 50% of ski boots have the necessary inserts. "Frame" bindings function similarly to regular alpine bindings, gripping a welt in the heel of the boot in downhill mode.

Manufacturers of alpine touring bindings include: Atomic/Salomon, Black Diamond, Dynafit, Fritschi, Genuine Guide Gear, and Marker.

== Nordic ==
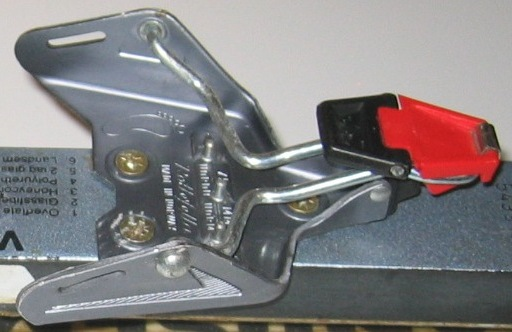
Nordic Norm cross-country binding with three pins that correspond to holes in toe of the ski boot and a bail with a latch to clamp down the toe of the boot.

Starting in the last half of the twentieth century, three standards for cross-country and telemark ski bindings emerged: The 75-mm Nordic Norm (NN), the Salomon Nordic System (SNS), and the New Nordic Norm (NNN). Ski jumping bindings are specialized to the sport. Companies that manufacture Nordic bindings include Alpina, Fischer, Madshus, Rossignol, and Rottefella.

=== Nordic systems—1970s ===
Adidas explored an alternative to the Nordic Norm binding in 1975 with a tab protruding from the boot that was clamped down in a narrow plastic binding. Salomon produced a ski boot with a metal loop, protruding from the toe of the boot, which was clamped in its binding. This was followed with the 1979 Salomon Nordic System binding system, which attached to a bar embedded in a slot in the toe of the ski boot. This binding configuration was emulated by Rottefella and other manufacturers as the New Nordic Norm.

=== Nordic Norm (NN) ===
The incorporation of flexible plastics into ski boot soles allowed them to be strong torsionally and side-to-side, while retaining lengthwise flexibility and allowing the heel to rise as without the need for a cable about the heel. The Rottefella binding became standardized as the 75-mm, three-pin, Nordic Norm binding, which was widespread by the 1970s.

=== Salomon Nordic System (SNS) ===
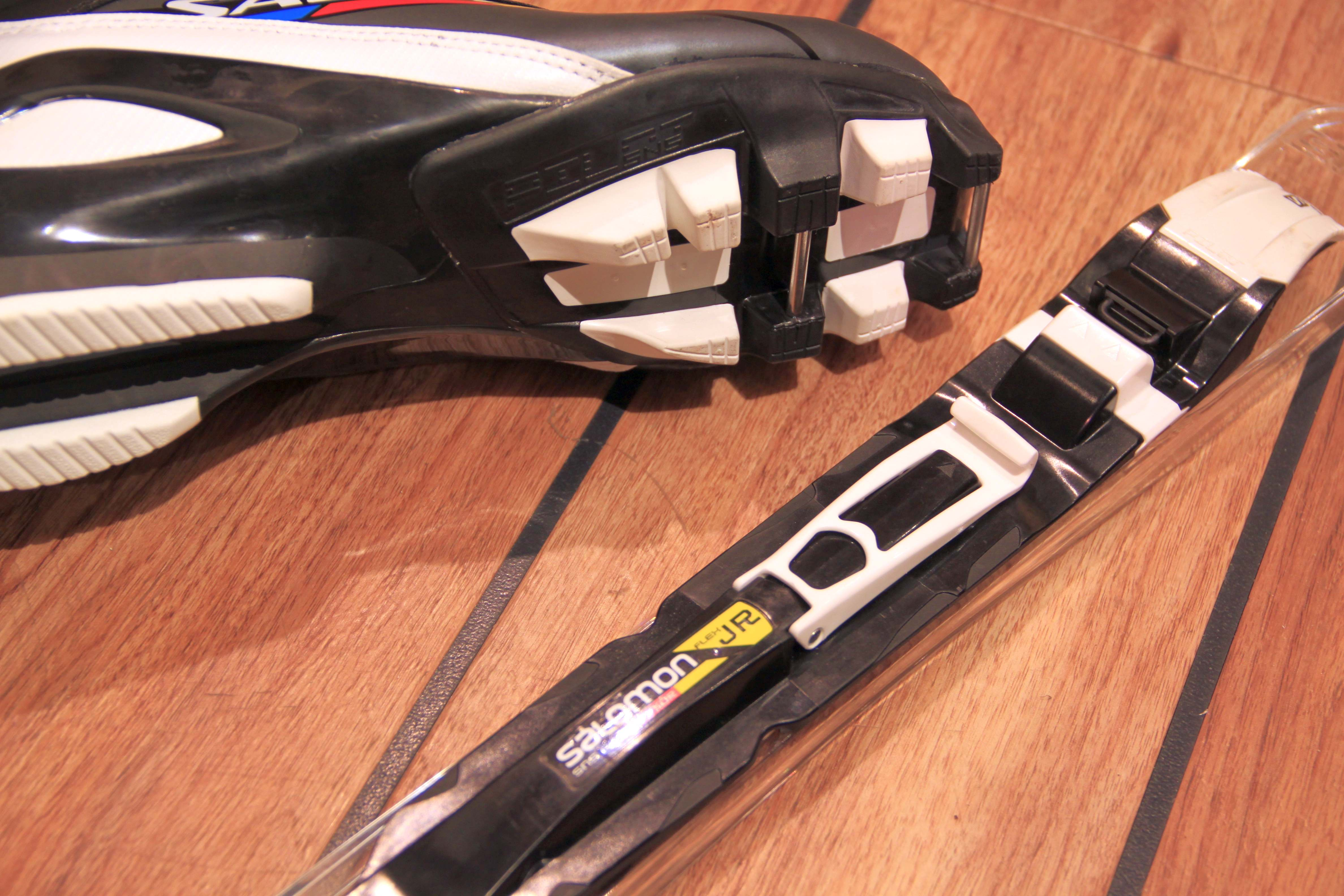
SNS Pilot binding with one central ridge and two stabilizing bars on the boot

The Salomon Nordic System (SNS) cross-country ski binding was the first integrated boot-binding system for cross-country skis, followed by the New Nordic Norm. The first generation (SNS) employed a looped bar protruding from the sole of the ski boot. Subsequent generations engage a bar recessed in the toe of the boot and incorporate a single, thick ridge along the binding plate. The variants included:

- SNS: Attaches to a U-shaped metal bar protruding from the front of the boot
- SNS Profil: Attaches to a recessed metal bar in the toe of the boot.
- SNS Pilot: Adds a recess for a second metal bar on the boot to enhance side-to-side control.
- SNS X-Adventure: Stronger design used for back-country skiing (also referred to as SNS–BC).

Pilot boots can be used with Profil bindings (Equipe models and similar, with a groove for the second Pilot axle), but Profil boots cannot be used with Pilot bindings due to the wider guide ridge of the latter.

Amer Sports offered SNS under their Salomon and Atomic brands.

In 2007, Fischer abandoned SNS and switched entirely to NIS format of the NNN system.

=== New Nordic Norm (NNN) ===
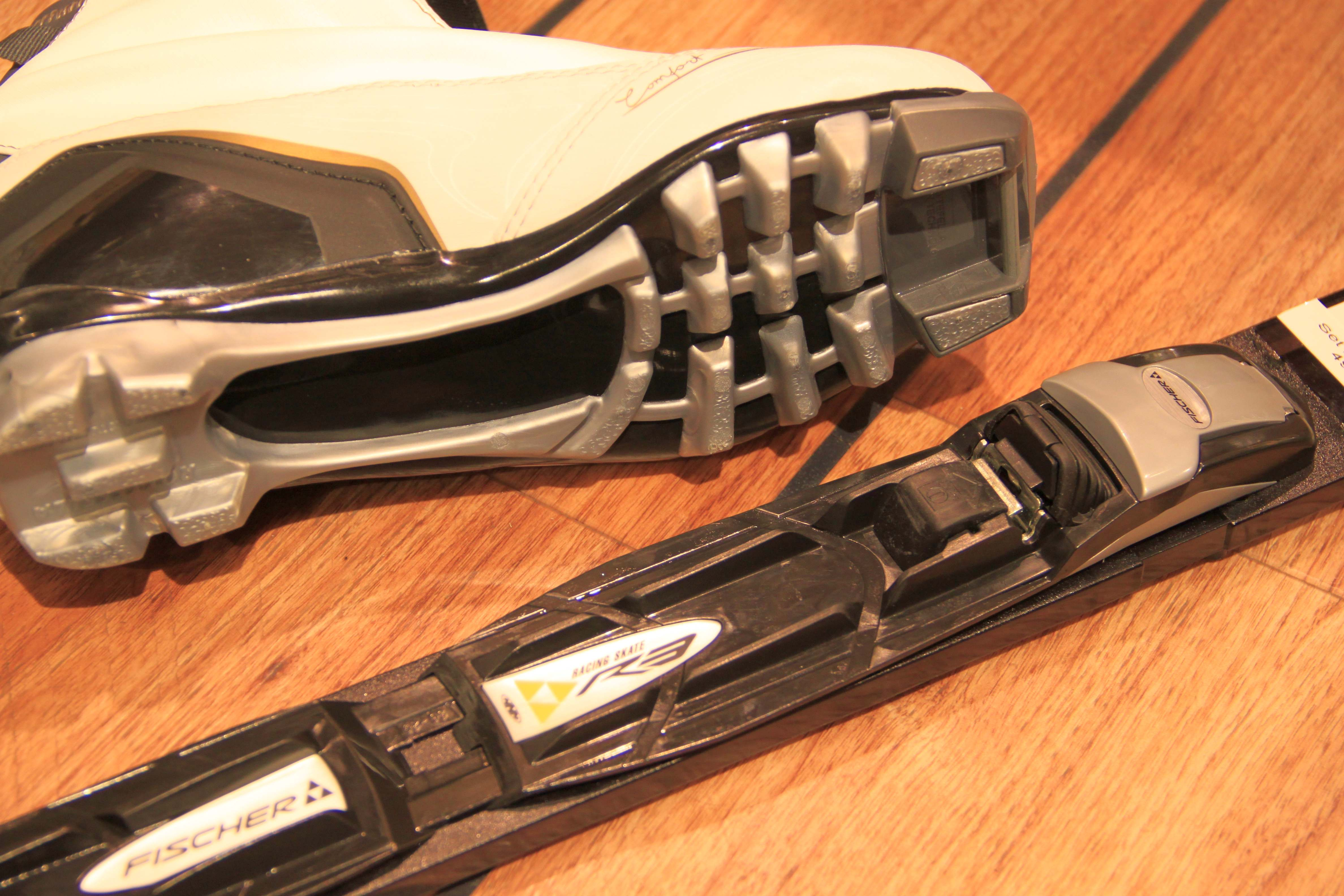
NNN binding with two ridges, matching corresponding channels in the boot

Rottefella's NNN (New Nordic Norm) cross-country ski binding has a bar in the toe of the boot hooked into a corresponding latch in the binding. Bindings are offered in several configurations, classical and skating, touring and racing. Second-generation bindings are not compatible with first-generation designs. This system is the basis for movable and integrated binding plates that include the Nordic Integrated System, the Turnamic, and Prolink.

A heavy-duty, wider version, NNN–BC, is designed for back-country skiing and features a more robust connection bar which works better with metal-edged skis and stiffer boots.

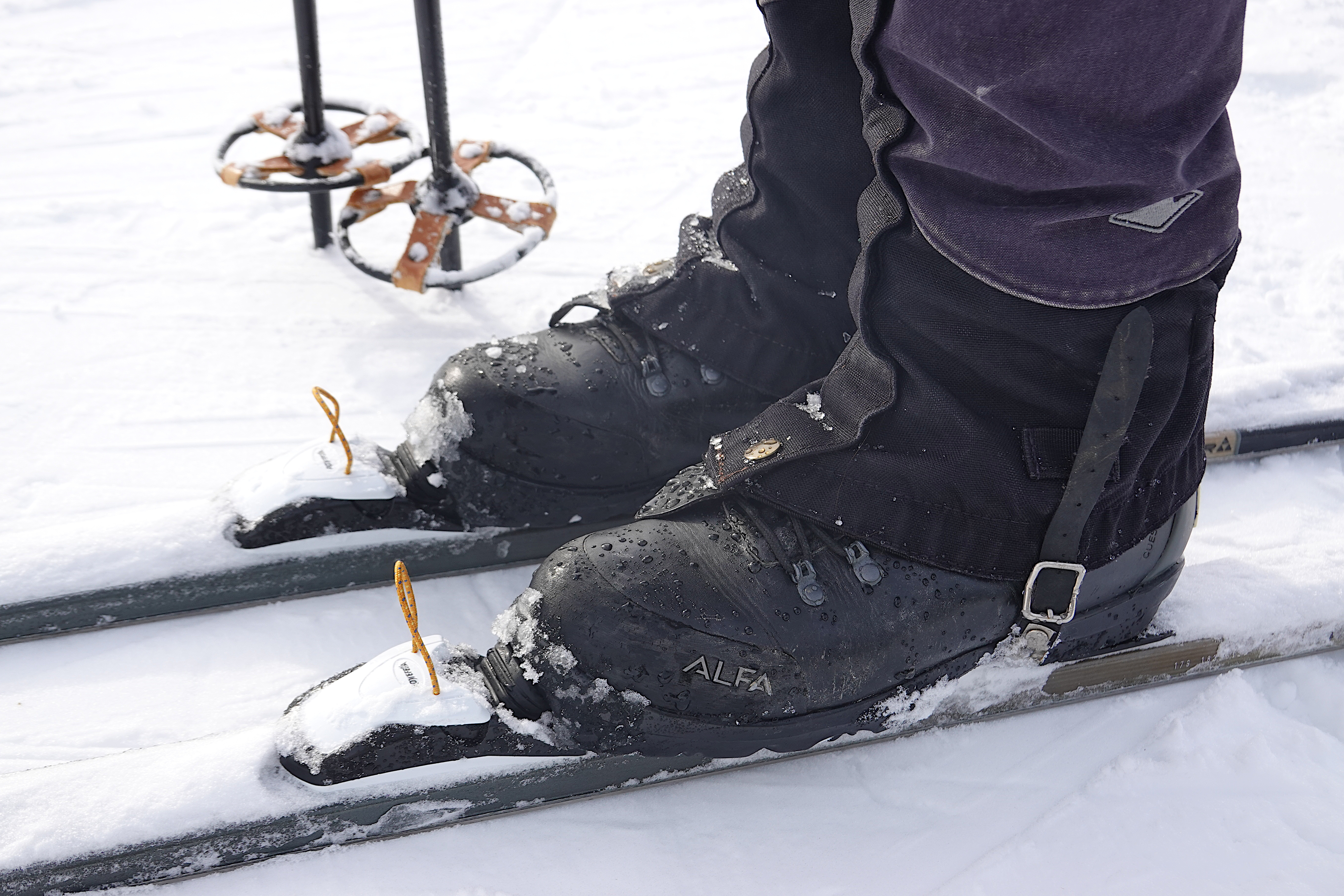
Ski touring boots and bindings based on the NNN-BC standard

==== Nordic Integrated System (NIS) ====
The Nordic Integrated System (NIS), introduced in 2005 by Rossignol, Madshus, Rottefella, and Alpina, incorporates an NNN-compatible toe attachment into an integrated binding plate on the top of the ski to which the bindings attach, allowing adjustment in the field with a metallic NIS key. The initial design of the plate used a movable insert for position adjustment, using a tool. A refinement allows for movement of the position of the binding on the plate with a locking knob, while wearing the skis. NIS skis allow installation of non-NIS bindings.

==== Turnamic (IFP) ====
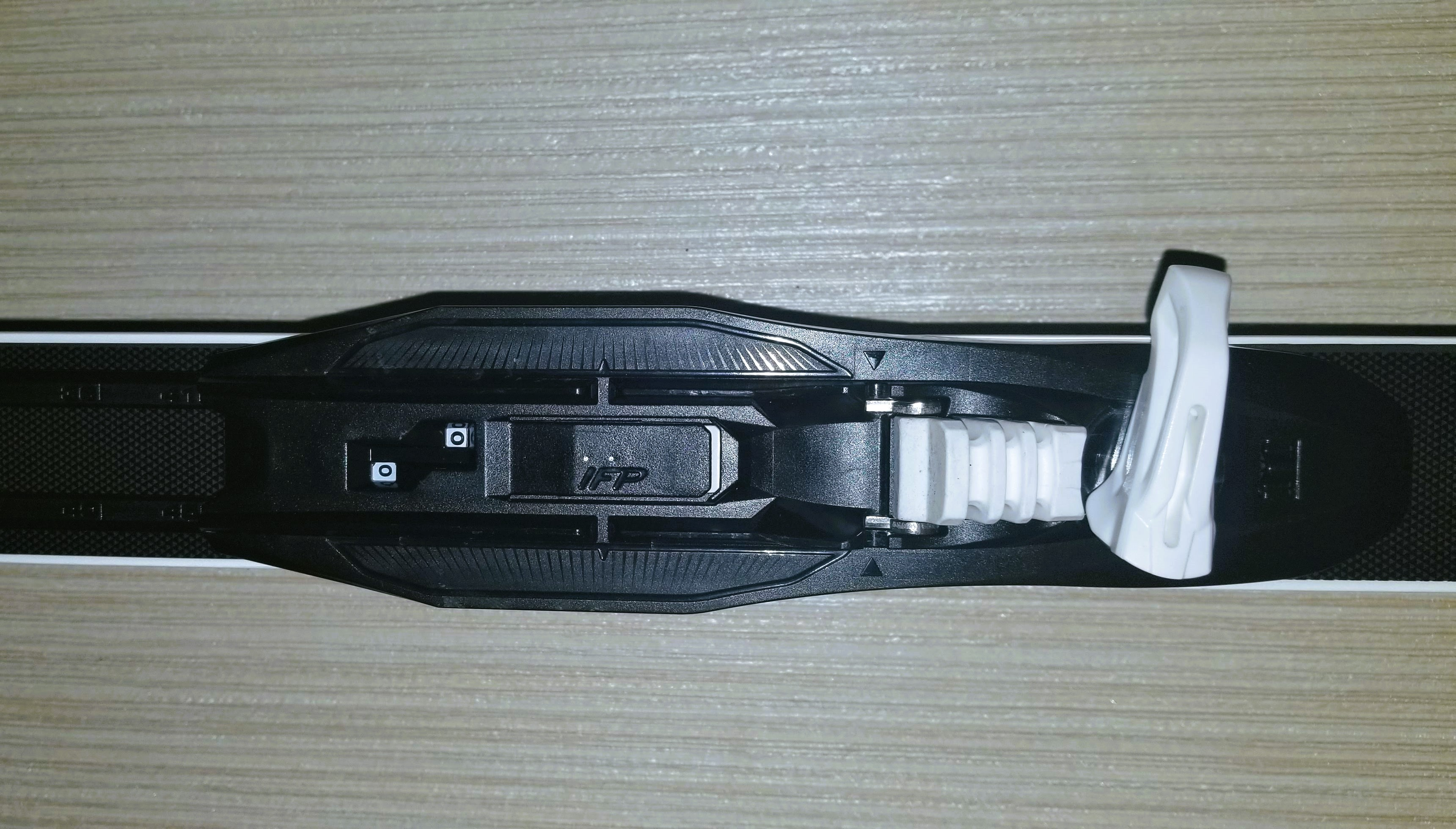
Turnamic binding. Boot locking lever is in the "open" position. IFP latch is in the center (with "IFP" stamped on it), the position offset indicators show zeroes.

In 2016, Fischer and Rossignol introduced a new "integrated fixation plate" (IFP) binding, which allows tool-less adjustment of the NNN-compatible binding position. The Turnamic binding uses step-in locking for the boot, and the lock closes or opens by turning the lever to the side.

==== Prolink ====
With the decline in sales of its SNS systems, Salomon introduced its NNN-compatible Prolink system in 2016.

=== New Telemark Norm (NTN) ===
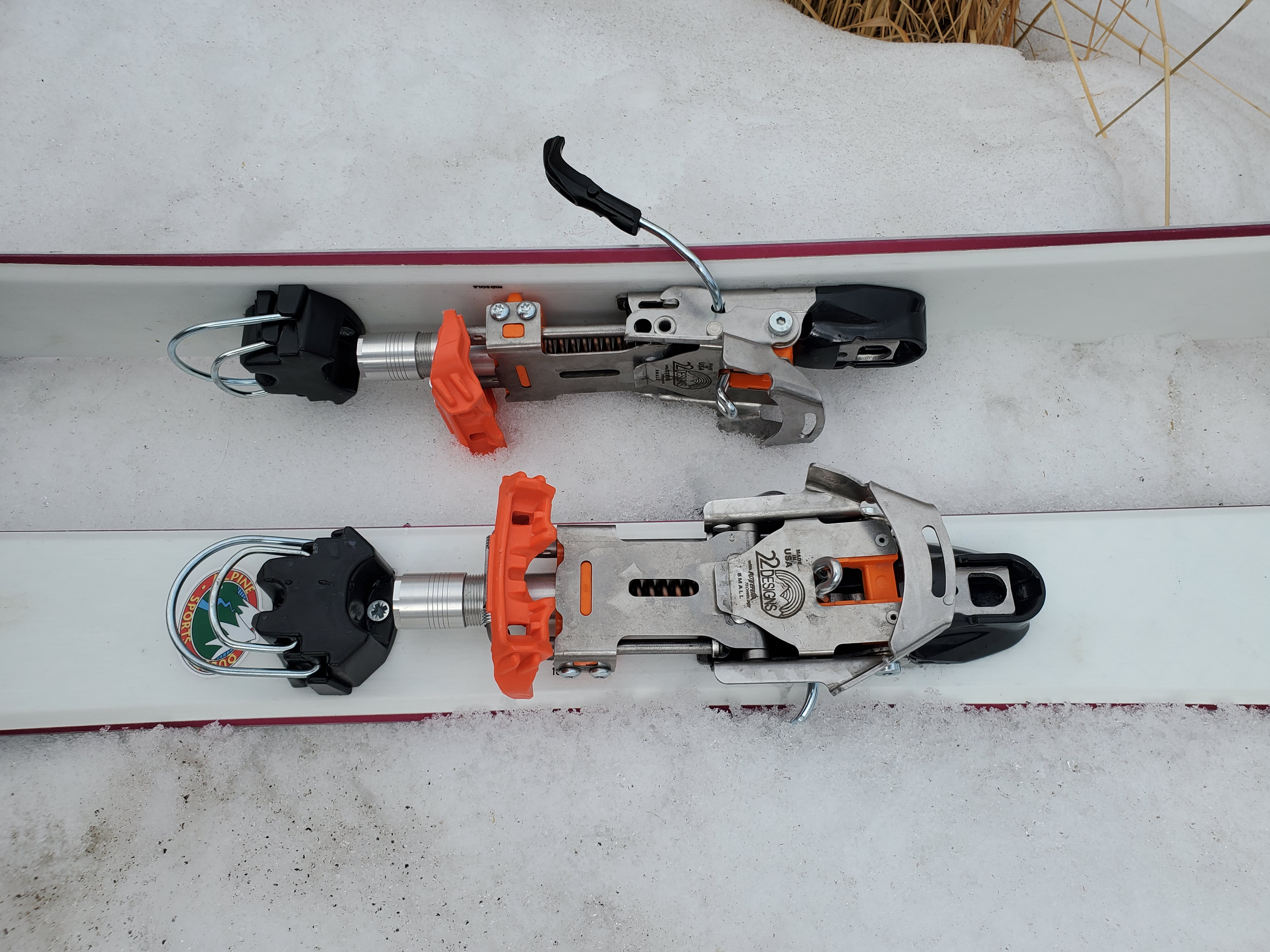
New Telemark Norm (NTN) Binding

In 2007, Rottefella introduced the New Telemark Norm binding featuring lateral release, adjustability, and a freely pivoting toe attachment.

=== Ski jumping ===
Ski jumping bindings attach to the toe of square-toed plastic boots that extend above the ankles; they allow for the boot heel to rise off the skis. They are designed to release the boot, in case of a fall.
