= Corrosion monitoring =

Corrosion monitoring is the use of a corrator (corrosion meter) or set of methods and equipment to provide offline or online information about corrosion rate expressed in mpy (mill per year). - for better care and to take or improve preventive measures to combat and protect against corrosion.

== Corrosion protection or corrosion monitoring ==
Various methods are used to prevent and protect against corrosion, such as cathodic protection, selection and injection of chemicals such as corrosion inhibitors or other ways to prevent corrosion. However, in order to see the results of these methods and how effective these measures are, corrosion monitoring should be done and, if necessary, corrosion protection methods should be modified or optimized based on the results obtained from corrosion monitoring. In many industries, preventive measures are used to protect against corrosion, but obviously without knowing the results of these measures, protection is a chance, that is, either full protection will not be done or in case of excessive protection, it will waste capital and resources.

== The difference between corrosion inspection and corrosion monitoring ==
There may be a general misconception between the term corrosion inspection and corrosion monitoring, but inspection means frequent checkpoints to check for changes or deviations from predicted results, while corrosion monitoring is a continuous check to control and act quickly against change. In inspection, the purpose is to evaluate or estimate the corrosion time in order to replace or correct the corrosion, while in corrosion monitoring, the purpose is to take care of the change in order to prevent corrosion and to improve the ways of prevention.

== Online corrosion monitoring methods ==
Online corrosion monitoring is mostly done using the following methods:

=== Use of weight loss coupons ===
Corrosion coupons are made in different shapes and sizes. These coupons are often made from same material of the pipe or tank/vessel which should be monitored for corrosion. The most common used coupons are as follows:

- strip coupon
- ladder strip coupon
- flush disc coupon
- multi-disc coupon
- scale coupon

=== Use of electrical resistance (ER) corrosion probes ===
Electric resistance corrosion probes are used in different types for different applications of online corrosion monitoring. The corrosion rate of these probes can be measured online or transferred to the control system by using corrosion handheld or fixed data loggers or by corrosion transmitters. The general type of ER probes element are as below:

- flush type
- cylindrical
- spiral loop
- wire loop
- tube loop

ER probes can be provided by adapter in order to connect to data logger or transmitters. The length of probes is dependent on the mounting and monitoring position.

=== Use of linear polar resistance probes ===
This method is mostly used for corrosion monitoring in water industry. These probes are suitable for monitoring fluctuations that may occur in a fluid inside the system. These probes are mostly used for conductive fluids such as water or any similar else.

=== Use of online ultrasonic thickness sensors ===
Online non-intrusive ultrasonic thickness sensors are a popular choice for corrosion monitoring in various industries, including oil and gas, chemical processing, and power generation. These sensors can provide accurate and reliable thickness measurements of metal structures without requiring physical access or disruption to the equipment. The sensors can be installed permanently and remotely connected to a monitoring system, allowing for continuous data collection and analysis. With the ability to detect corrosion early on, online ultrasonic thickness sensors can help prevent equipment failure, reduce downtime, and improve overall safety and efficiency.

=== Use of hydrogen probes ===
Hydrogen probes are used to monitor the penetration of hydrogen into steels, which can cause brittleness, porosity or decarbonization.

=== Using a sand probe ===
These probes are mostly used to monitor corrosion caused by erosion or wear. Generally, the erosion are occurred in gas pipelines where the speed of fluid cause erosion. Here the erosion is more important than corrosion.

=== Use a biological probe or bio-probe ===
Biological probe or bio-probes are used to collect samples for microbiological analysis. Microorganisms can accelerate the corrosion process, so monitoring the corrosion caused by them is effective in timely notification and preventive measures.

== Main equipment of corrosion monitoring system ==
In addition to probes, the items below are the main ones used in corrosion monitoring:

=== Access fittings ===
The access fittings - such as flanged, flare-weld, etc.- are used for connection and access to coupons and probes. The general size of A/F is 2" which is called 2" system. But for small pipe sizes, 1" system can be used.

=== Coupon holder ===
Coupon holders are used to fix corrosion coupons inside a pipe or tank and attaches itself to a solid plug or hollow plug. They are usually made from stainless steel 316/316L or Monel and inconel or other corrosion resistant materials.

=== Service valve ===
Service valve is a ball type used to block fluid while replacing corrosion coupons or probes despite fluid flow. The service valve is attached to solid or hollow plug after removing of access fitting cover. It blocks the fluid while the coupon or probe is retrieved by retriever and passed through it.

=== Retriever for retrieval without process interruption ===
Retriever is used to insert and retrieve coupons and probes without interrupting the process. They can be provided in hydraulic and mechanical types.
