= Erasmus University Rotterdam =

Public university in the Netherlands

Coordinates: 51°55′05″N 4°31′33″E

- Erasmus Universiteit Rotterdam
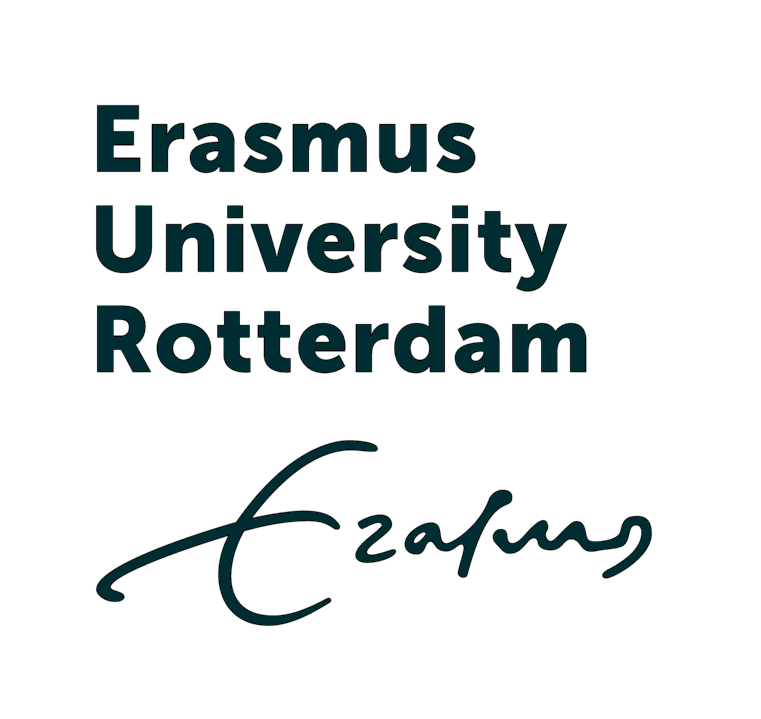
- Latin: Academiae Erasmianae Roterodamensis
- Motto in English: Making Minds Matter and Creating a Force for Positive Change
- Type: Public
- Established: 1913; 113 years ago – Nederlandsche Handels-Hoogeschool; 1937; 89 years ago – renamed Nederlandse Economische Hogeschool (with university status granted); 1966; 60 years ago – establishment Medische Faculteit Rotterdam; 1973; 53 years ago – merger Medische Faculteit Rotterdam and Nederlandse Economische Hogeschool; renamed to Erasmus University Rotterdam
- Affiliations: AMBA, EQUIS, AACSB, TPC
- Budget: €859,1 million (2023)
- Rector: Jantine Schuit
- Academic staff: 3,207 (2023)
- Administrative staff: 3,130 (2023)
- Undergraduates: 20,508 (2023)
- Postgraduates: 11,104 (2023)
- Doctoral students: 2,628 (2023)
- Location: Rotterdam and The Hague, South Holland, Netherlands
- Colours: Erasmus Bright Green, Erasmus Green and Erasmus Warm Grey
- Website: eur.nl

Erasmus University Rotterdam (Dutch: Erasmus Universiteit Rotterdam [eːˈrɑsmʏs ynivɛrsiˈtɛit rɔtərˈdɑm]; abbreviated as EUR) is a public research university located in Rotterdam, Netherlands. The university is named after Desiderius Erasmus Roterodamus, a 15th-century Christian humanist and theologian.

Erasmus MC, the teaching hospital and medical school of Erasmus University, is one of the largest medical institutions in Western Europe and the foremost medical and trauma centers in the Netherlands.

== History ==
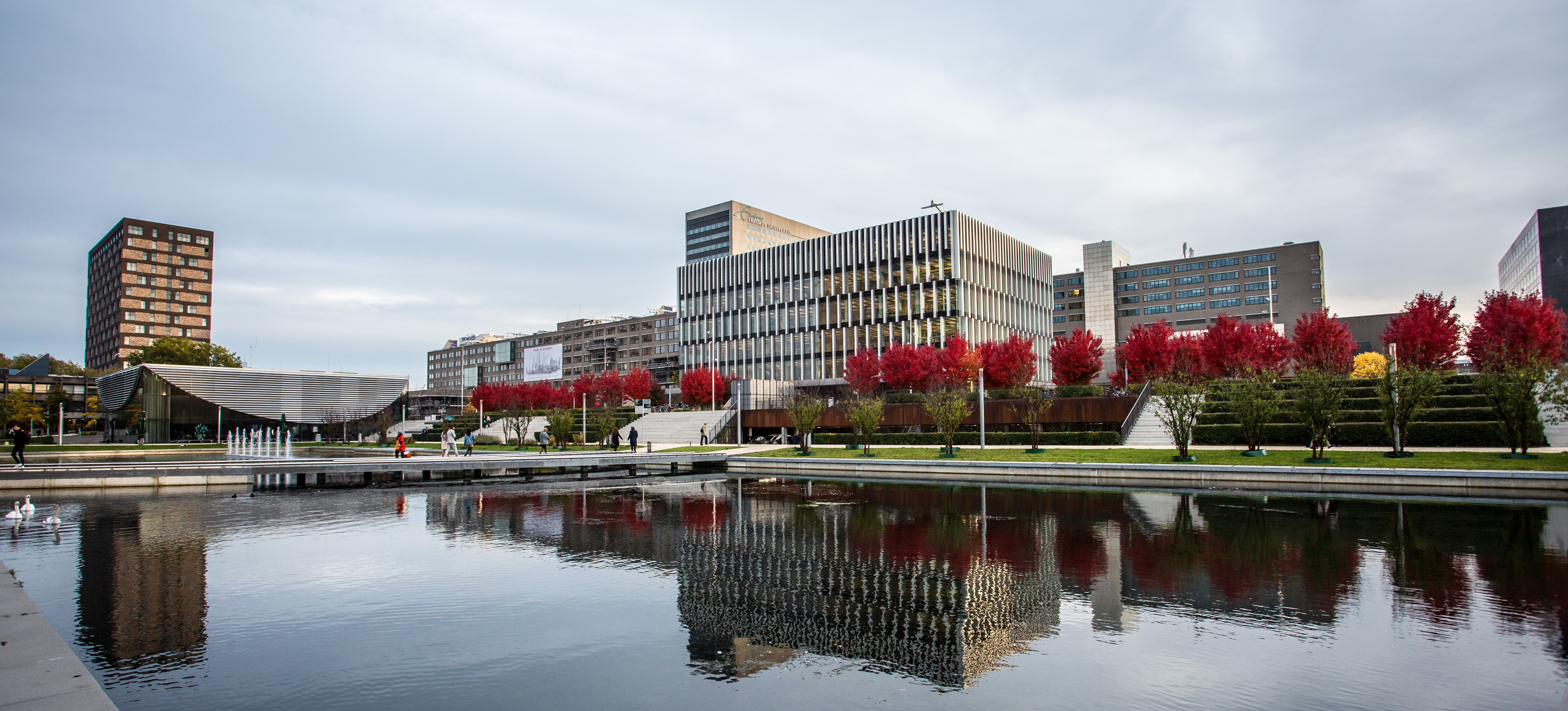
The campus of Erasmus University Rotterdam

Erasmus University Rotterdam was founded on 8 November 1913 as the Netherlands School of Commerce (Nederlandsche Handels-Hoogeschool, or NHH) through private initiative with broad support from the business community of Rotterdam. In 1937, the school was recognized as a higher educational institute with university status, providing education in commerce and economics as an academic discipline. This resulted in a change of its name: the NHH became the NEH, or Netherlands School of Economics (Nederlandse Economische Hogeschool). The growing complexity of society led, in the 1960s, to the arrival of the faculties of Law and Social Sciences, followed in later decades by Philosophy, History and Arts, and Business Administration.

From 1950, the Foundation for Higher Clinical Education used its best efforts to get a full academic medical study programme established in Rotterdam, and with success: In 1966, the government established the Medical Faculty Rotterdam (Medische Faculteit Rotterdam), housed next to Dijkzigt Hospital. Together with the Sophia Children's Hospital and the Daniel den Hoed Clinic, it forms the University Hospital Rotterdam, which as of 1 January 2003, bears the name Erasmus MC. In 1973, the Medical Faculty Rotterdam and the Netherlands School of Economics merged, after which the institution was renamed under its current name Erasmus University Rotterdam (Erasmus Universiteit Rotterdam) – the first university in the Netherlands named after a person, a man to whom Rotterdam owes the reputation it has held for centuries in the academic world.

=== Health ===
This domain includes the Erasmus MC, the Erasmus School of Health Policy and Management (ESHPM) and the Institute for Medical Technology Assessment (iMTA).

Erasmus MC is the new name for the university medical centre in Rotterdam, which is a merger of the Faculty of Medicine and Health Sciences and the University Hospital Rotterdam (Dijkzigt, Sophia, Daniel den Hoed clinic). The biomedical cluster plays a leading role in the field of analysis of role of individual genes playing role in diseases. The Forensic Molecular Biology department works together with the Netherlands Forensic Institute (NFI). Major long-term genetic epidemiological studies among the elderly and children are Erasmus Rotterdam Health for the Elderly (ERGO) and Generation R respectively. The Erasmus School of Health Policy and Management (ESHPM) forms a bridge between medicine and the health sciences on the one hand and social sciences on the other. The institute for Medical Technology Assessment (iMTA) conducts health economic research in collaboration with both the Erasmus MC and the Erasmus School of Health Policy and Management.

=== Wealth ===
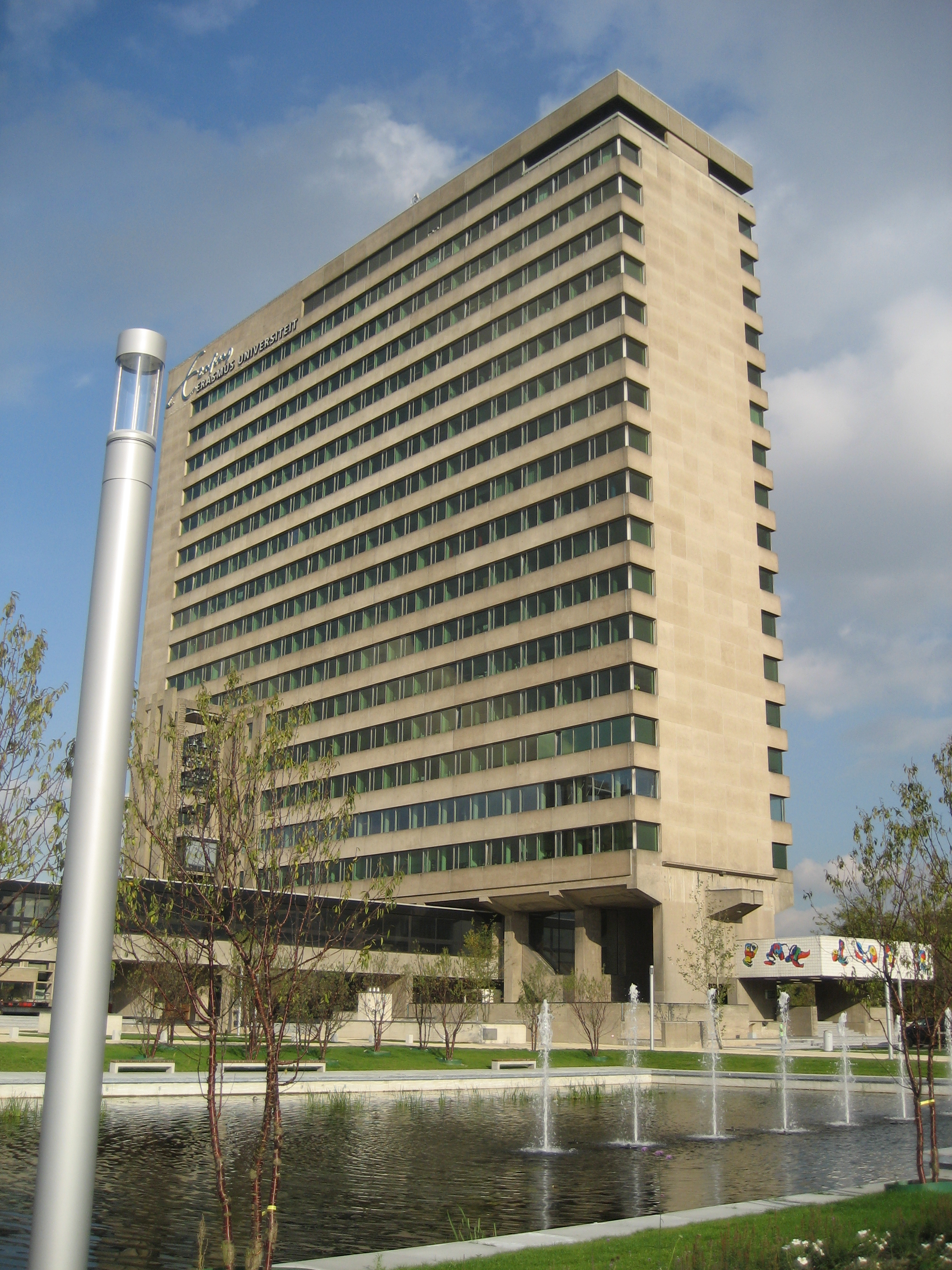
Erasmus University main faculty building containing Erasmus School of Economics.

This area includes the Erasmus School of Economics and the Rotterdam School of Management. Its economics programs and management programs attract students and postgraduates from all over the world. The research schools Erasmus Institute for Management (ERIM) and the Tinbergen Institute attract PhD students, research fellows, PostDocs and visiting professors of repute from all corners of the world. Other joint ventures are the English-language programme International Business Administration, the Erasmus Executive Development programme (EED) and the Erasmus University Centre for Contract Research and Business Support (ERBS).

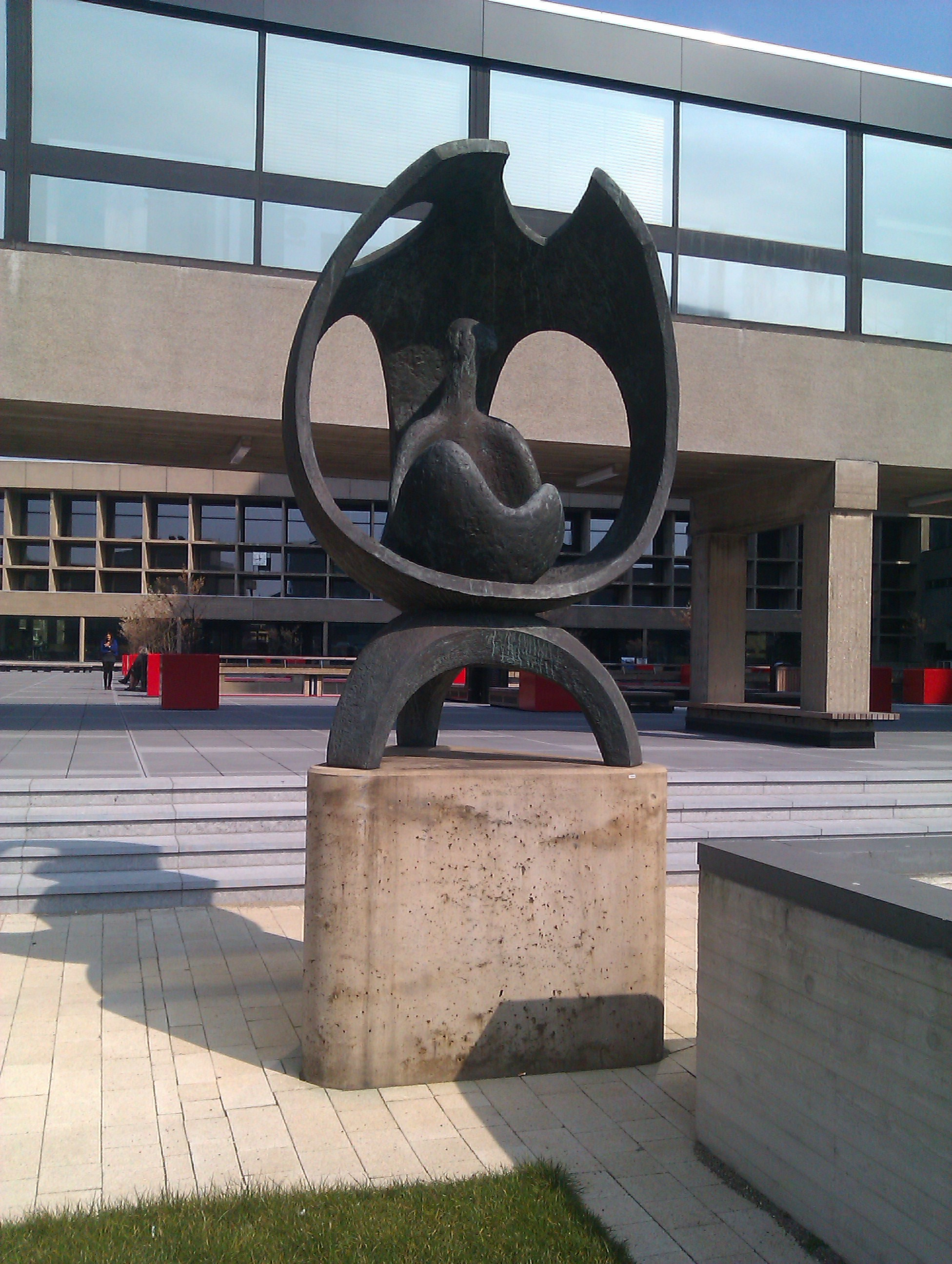
Alma Mater statue created by sculptor Ger van Iersel.

=== Governance ===
The research focuses on the organisation of business and society. This area has ground in common not only with economics and management, but also with medicine and health sciences.

=== Culture ===
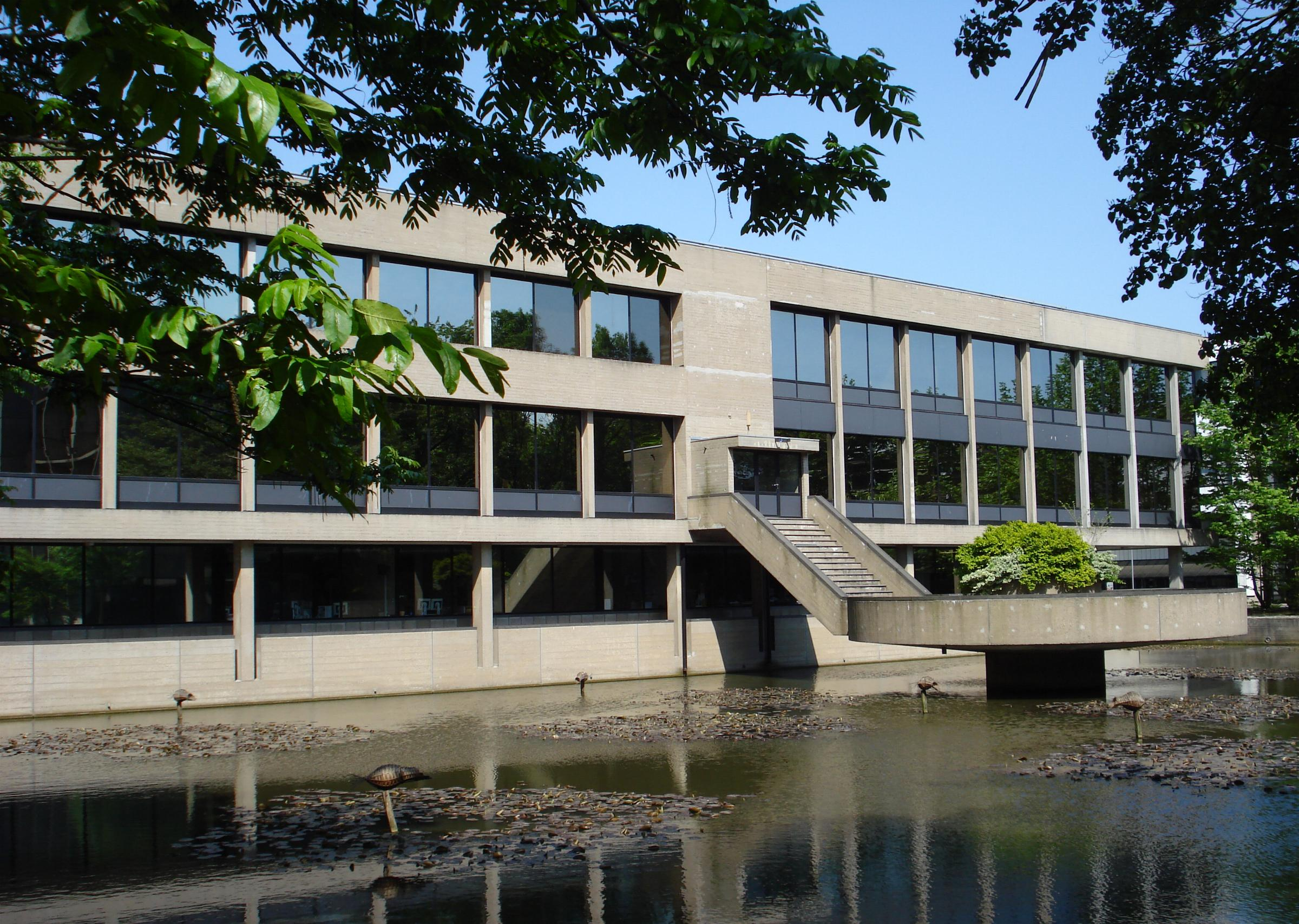
University Library.

As one of four concentrations of Erasmus University, culture is defined broadly with focus on the areas of media, cultural economics, and the high arts. Primary research is on society and the arts, including cultural policy, media, and social identity in modern society. Faculty has particular strengths in research, and the students tend to graduate with strong research skills for both academic and field placement.

=== Protests ===
Like other Dutch universities, EUR has seen waves of campus occupations and protests by climate activists and student groups in recent years, particularly targeting university links to the fossil fuel industry and demanding implementation of more sustainable and transparent policies. Several high-profile occupations in 2022–2023 were broken up by riot police, sparking controversy around the university's response to activism and freedom of assembly on campus. On 30 May and 9 June, as part of a wave of pro-Palestinian protests, students set up a tent encampment. This lasted until 9 June after threatened intervention by riot police.

In 2025, there was a planned demonstration against a professor that made the anti-Palestinian posts. On 23 October, the Executive Board issued a statement condemning the demonstration, citing safety concerns and remarked that it offers "space for differences of opinion".

== Research institutes/schools ==
=== Wealth ===
==== Erasmus Research Institute of Management ====
The Erasmus Research Institute of Management (ERIM) is the joint research institute of the Rotterdam School of Management and the Erasmus School of Economics, both at Erasmus University Rotterdam. It aims to bring together top researchers in business and management.

==== Econometric Institute ====
Erasmus University today is seen as the leading university in Econometrics and Operational Research. Jan Tinbergen, Nobel Prize winner for Economics (1969), and Henri Theil founded the Econometric Institute and influenced both Econometrics & Management Science. Tinbergen's theories also had a political inclination, with multiple objectives of price stability and employment and policies to achieve the desired results and stabilizing the economy.

==== Tinbergen Institute (TI) ====
The Tinbergen Institute is a joint institute for research and education in economics, econometrics and finance of the University of Amsterdam, the VU University Amsterdam and the Erasmus University Rotterdam. It is one of the top research institutes and graduate schools in economics and finance in the world. It offers a research master program (MPhil) in economics and finance as well as PhD opportunities.

==== Transport, Infrastructure and Logistics (TRAIL) ====
In association with TU Delft, the TRAIL Research School is the Dutch national research school active in the fields of Transport, Infrastructure, and Logistics.

==== Erasmus Centre for Entrepreneurship (ECE) ====
Erasmus Centre for Entrepreneurship is an independent research and education organisation that originated from the Erasmus University, centring around entrepreneurship, both locally and globally.

=== Health ===
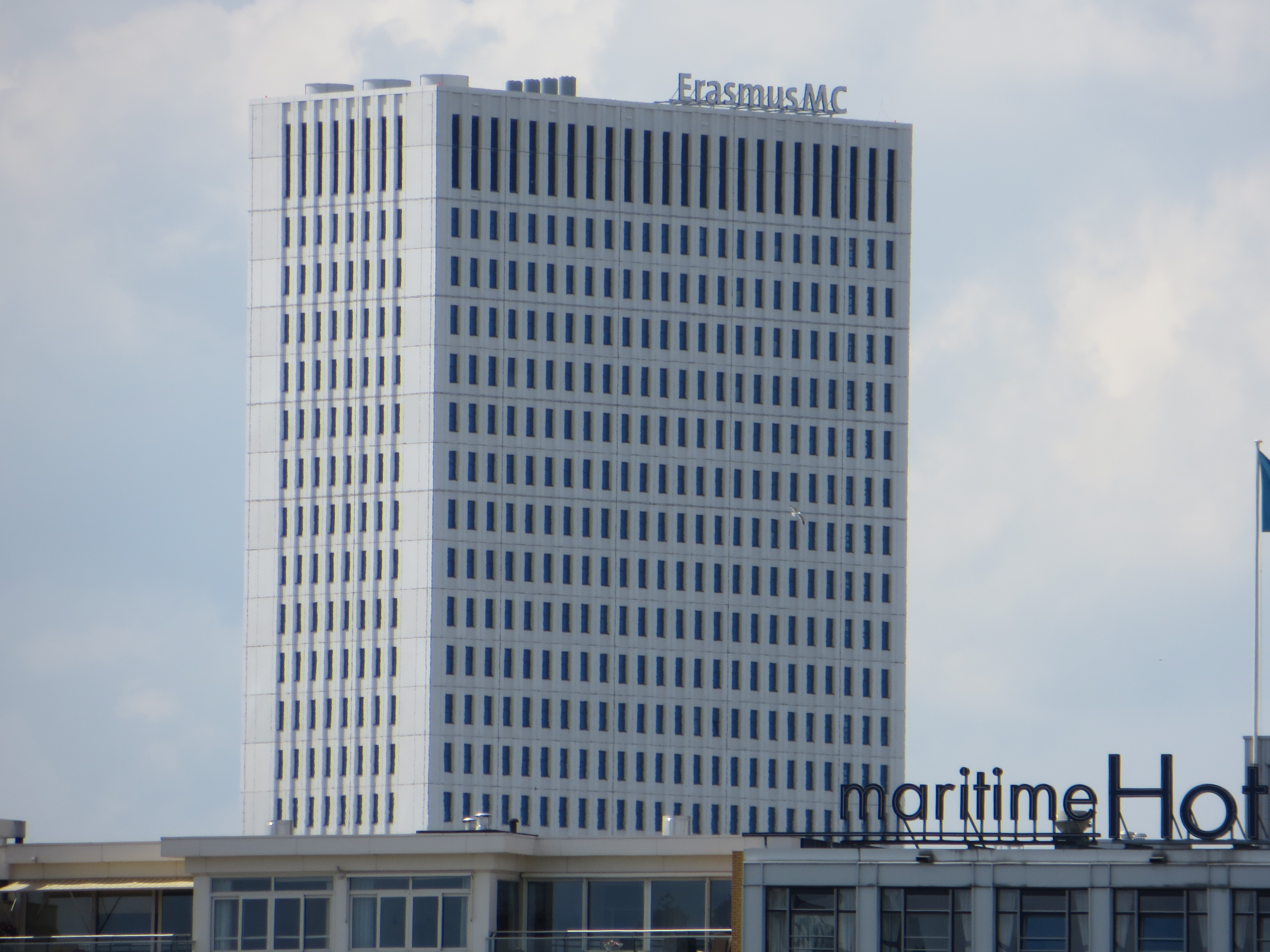
New building (2012) of the Erasmus MC.

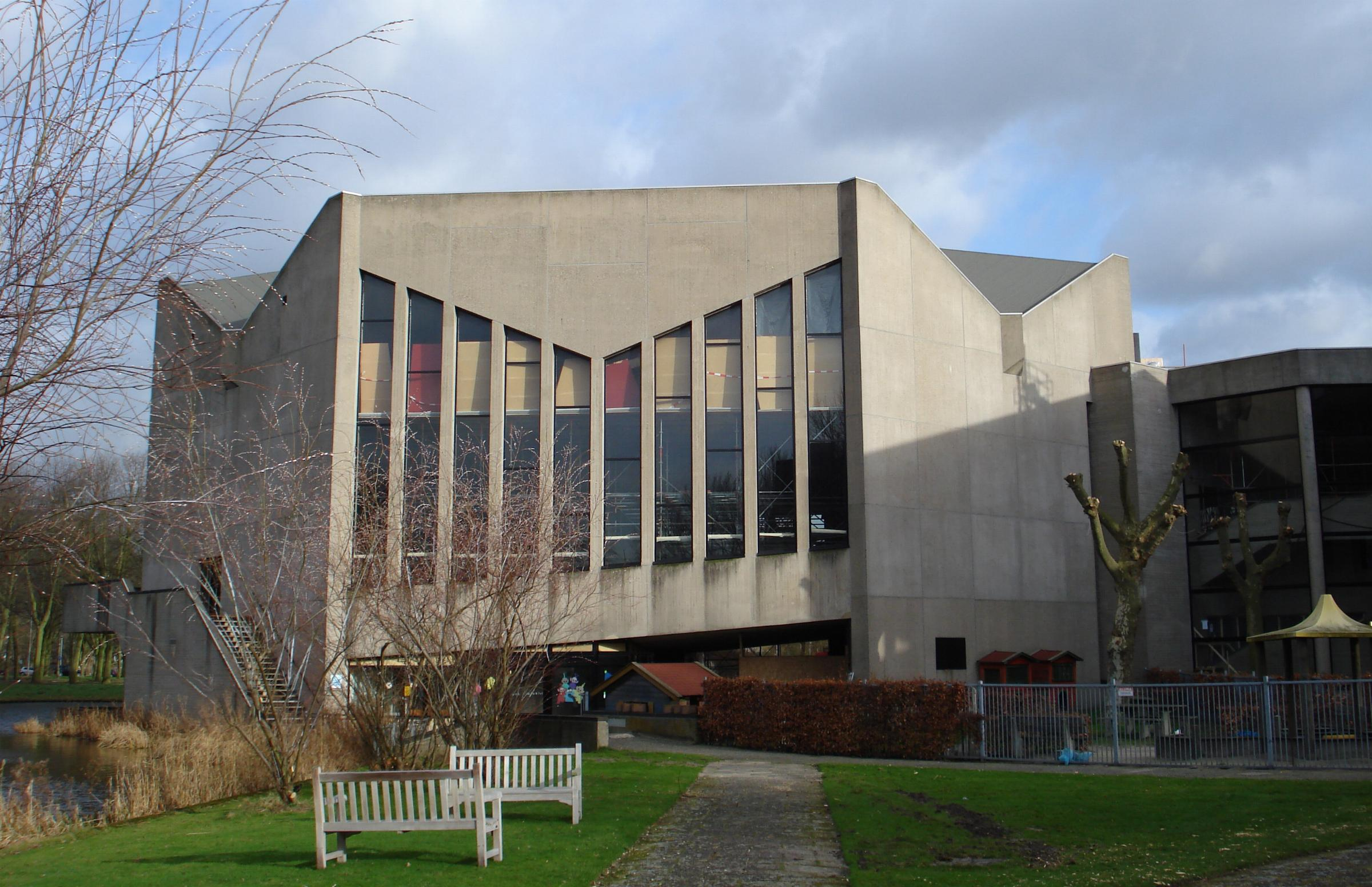
University Aula.

- Cardiovascular Research School Erasmus University Rotterdam (COEUR)
- Netherlands Institute for Health Sciences (NIHES)
- Postgraduate School Molecular Medicine (MM)
- Medical Genetics Centre South-West Netherlands (MGC)

MGC participates in the top Research School Centre for Developmental and Biomedical Genetics

- Helmholtz School for Autonomous Systems Research

=== Law, Culture and Society ===
- Institute for Sales and Account Management
- International Institute of Social Studies
- Research School Public Safety
- Netherlands Institute of Government (NIG)
- Huizinga Instituut
- N.W. Posthumus Instituut
- Amsterdam School of Social-Public Research (ASSR)
- Research School Rights of the human
- Experimental Psychologic Researchschool (EPOS)
- Kurt Lewin Institute
- Research School of Ethics

== Campus ==
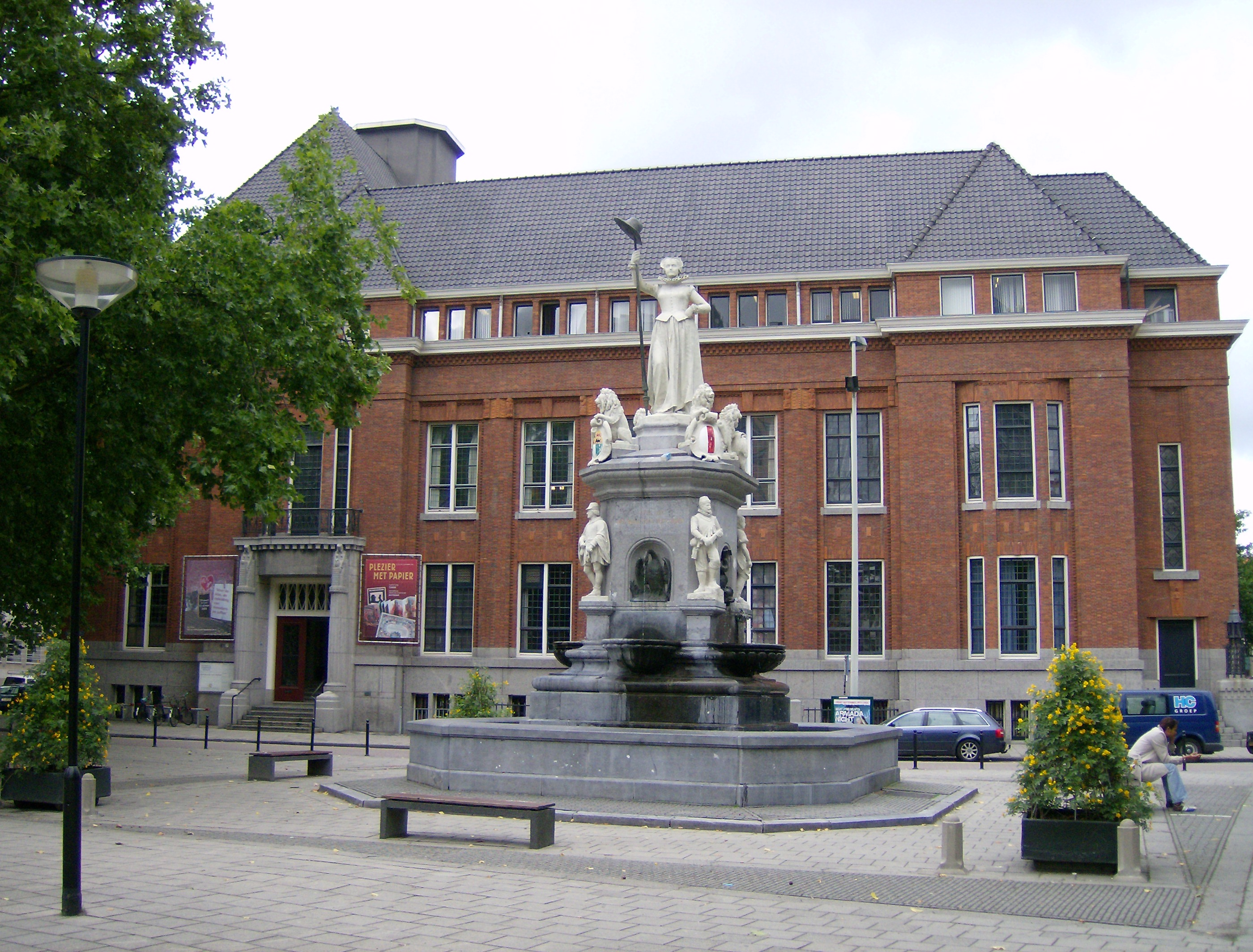
Erasmus University College

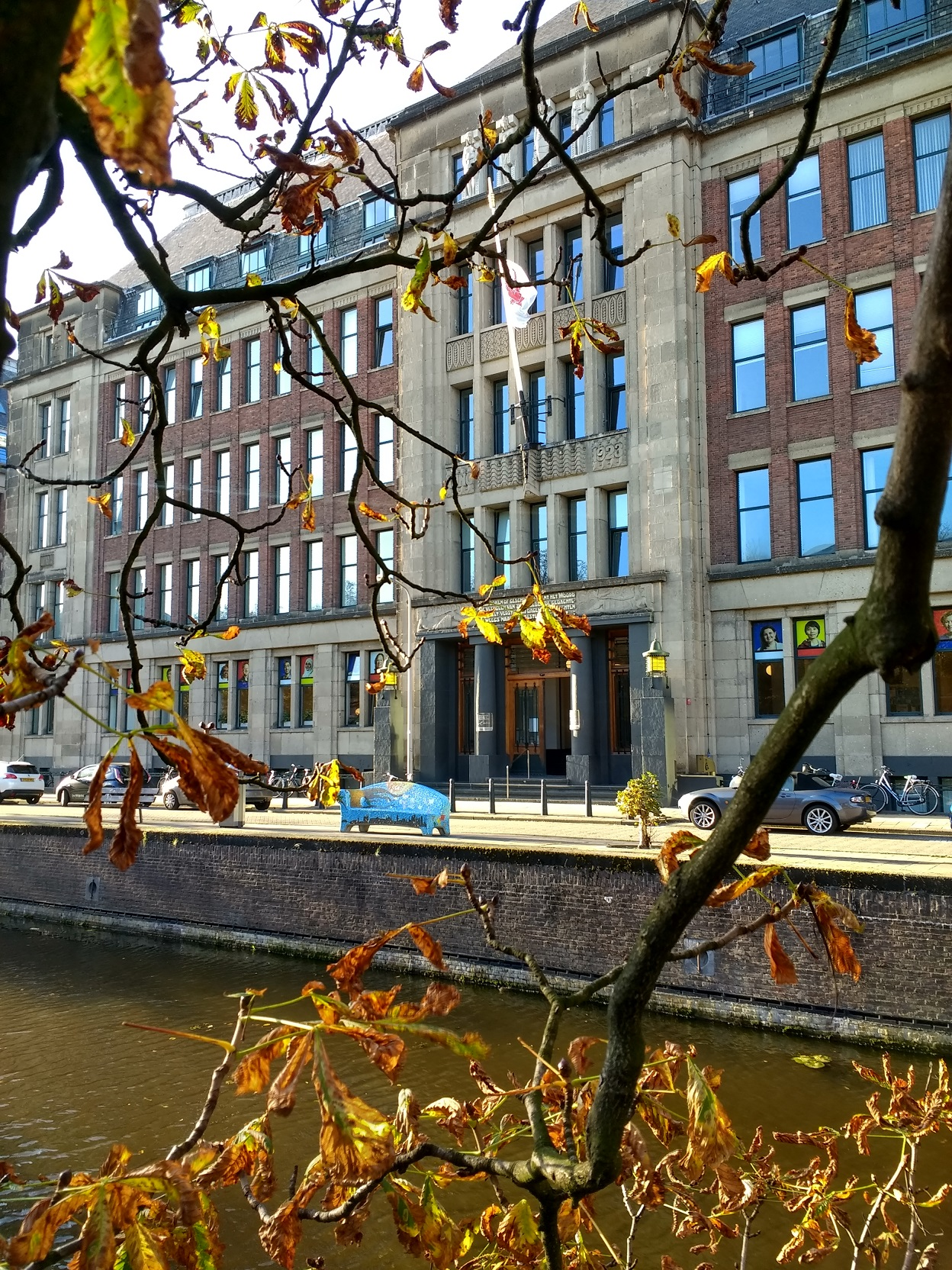
International Institute of Social Studies in the Hague.

The University has campuses at five locations, of which four in Rotterdam and one in The Hague:

- Campus Woudestein (main university location near Rotterdam-Kralingen)
- Campus Hoboken (Erasmus MC location near Rotterdam-Dijkzigt)
- Location EUC (Erasmus University College in Rotterdam Center)
- Location ISS (International Institute of Social Studies located in The Hague Center)
- Location ECE (Erasmus Centre for Entrepreneurship near Rotterdam-Delfshaven)

=== Sustainability ===
On 9 September 2009 ("Sustainability Day"), GreenEUR was launched officially. During this day, GreenEUR organized several on-campus activities in cooperation with Greening the Campus. Since April 2010 GreenEUR is officially recognized by the Executive Board. August 1st, 2020, the university became smoke-free on school grounds, 24 hours a day, seven days a week, in accordance with the national legislation. Ensuring that the campus remains smoke-free and contributes to a healthier society. The S building has been transformed into an Exam Centre and multiple buildings have been added to the campus, including the Langeveld Building and the Sports Building. The Sports Building is 100 percent self-efficient in power due to roof-mounted solar panels, which contribute to the principles of circular construction. Including the Tinbergen Building, a municipal monument since 1968, which is currently under renovation, ensuring more efficient energy through double glazing, solar panels, energy-efficient installations, natural ventilation, and sustainable materials. Achieving the BREEAM design certificate 'Outstanding'.

== Student activities ==
- In Duplo – Student Association for double degree students
- AEclipse – Student Association for Master and Pre-Master students at the Erasmus School of Economics
- Economic Faculty Association Rotterdam
- STAR Student Association Rotterdam School of Management
  - STAR Management Week
  - Erasmus Consultancy Project
- FAECTOR – official school association Erasmus School of Economics
  - Econometric Career Days
- Erasmus debating society – oldest debating society in the Netherlands
- Erasmus Centre for Entrepreneurship
- Erasmus Magazine
- EUCSA – Student Association EUC Campus, Liberal Arts & Sciences
- Investment Week & Symposium
- Student Investment Society B&R Beurs
- International Students Rotterdam (ISR) - Society for all international students
- Erasmus Sport
- IFA ACE – International Faculty Association for students of the Erasmus School of History, Culture, and Communication

== Rankings ==
University rankings

Global – Overall
- ARWU World: 101–150 (2024)
- CWUR World: 111 (2025)
- CWTS World: 104 (2024)
- QS World: 140 (2026)
- THE World: 107 (2025)
- USNWR Global: 89 (2026–27)

Global – Business and economics
- Business Insider MBA: 29 (2020)
- Financial Times MBA: 56 (2025)
- QS Business: 22 (2025)
- QS Economics: 55 (2025)
- QS MBA: 32 (2025)
- THE Business and Economics: 23 (2025)

Global – Life sciences and medicine
- ARWU Clinical medicine and pharmacy: 51–75 (2024)
- ARWU Life sciences: 76–100 (2024)
- QS Life Sciences & Medicine: 83 (2025)
- THE Clinical and Health: 52 (2025)

=== Erasmus School of Economics ===
Economics Department

The economics faculty is, according to the QS World University Rankings 2018, the 9th best in Europe (UK included) and 50th in the world in economics and econometrics, and 37th in the world in accounting and finance (10th best in Europe).

Times Higher Education World University Rankings ranks Erasmus University 1st in the Netherlands, 7th in Europe, and 28th in the world for the subject Economics and Business in 2020.

The Shanghai Jiao Tong University Academic Ranking of World Universities published in 2018, lists Erasmus School of Economics as 9th in Europe and 32nd in the world in the fields of economics and business.

Erasmus University Rotterdam has received high rankings in the fields of Economics and Business. According to US News 2022, the university ranked 1st in the Netherlands, 2nd in Europe and 10th in the world for Economics and Business.

=== Rotterdam School of Management ===
The Financial Times European Business School Rankings as well as the Global MBA rankings consistently lists RSM as top 10 in Europe. The Financial Times ranked the CEMS MSc in International Management offered by Rotterdam School of Management, Erasmus University as third in the world in 2022. QS ranked the school's MSc Global Business & Sustainability program among the top 60 in the world in the 2023 International Trade Rankings.

Accreditation

The business school has achieved triple accreditation from the international accrediting bodies of management education: AMBA, EQUIS, and AACSB. Only 100 business schools in the world have acquired triple accreditation, although many schools have a policy of not applying for multiple accreditations.

=== Erasmus Medical Center ===
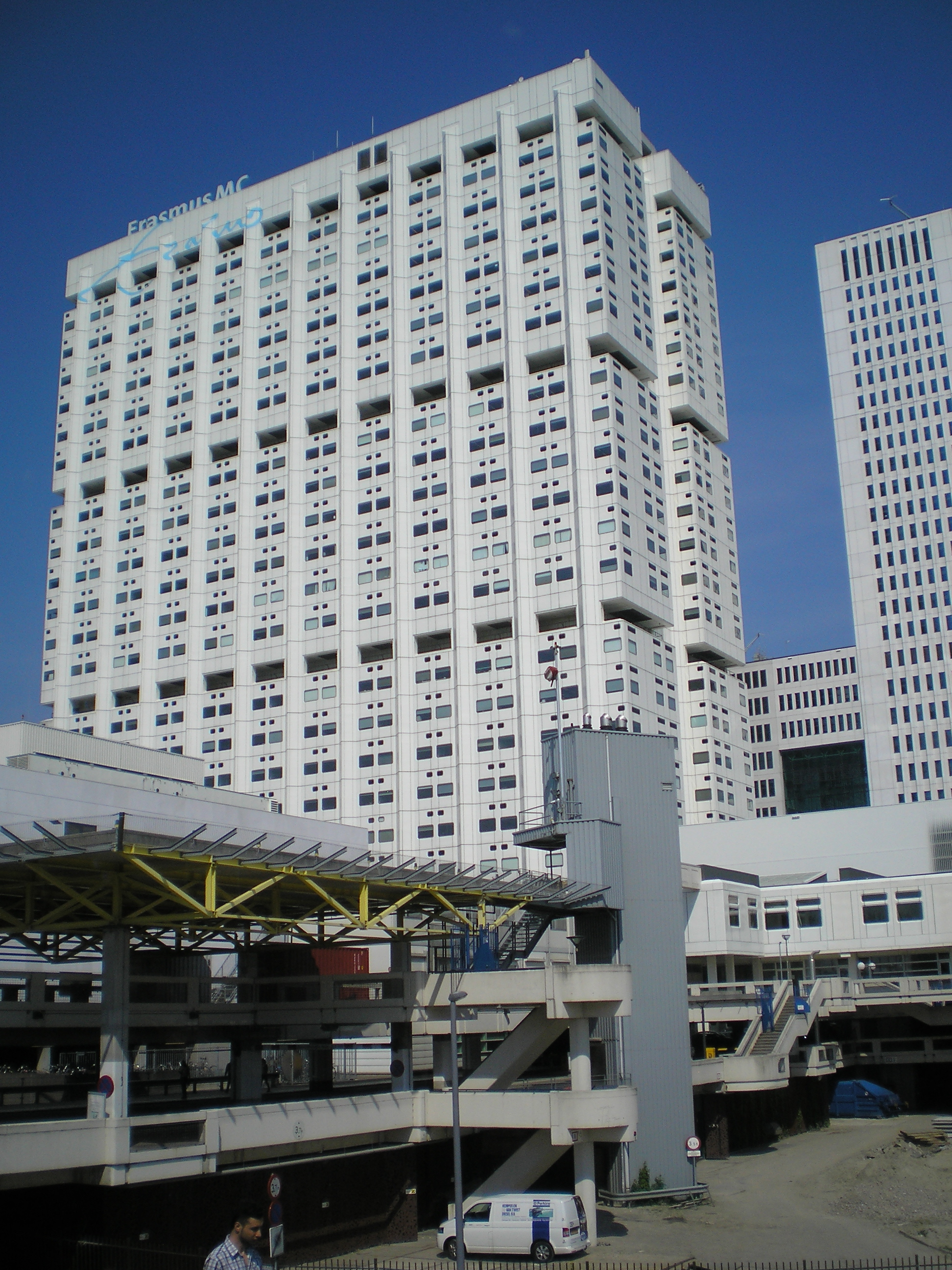
Main building of Erasmus MC, the University Medical Center

The Erasmus MC (university medical center) is considered by several major rankings to be a global top institution for clinical medicine, i.e. ranked in the world as 45th in 2020 by Times Higher Education World University Rankings, as 28th in 2020 by U.S. News & World Report Best Global Universities Ranking and 50th in 2019 by QS World University Rankings.

The Erasmus MC is listed by The Scientist as the fifth-best of the top 15 medical institutions outside the United States (ranking 2004).

== Education ==
=== Undergraduate programmes ===
Erasmus University Rotterdam offers a broad range of Bachelor's programmes taught in the Dutch language, leading to a B.A., BSc or LL.B. degree.

Furthermore, the university offers several completely English-language Bachelor programmes. These programmes are open to students aiming for an international career in Business and/or Economics or Communication and Media. Apart from the Dutch students, at least 50% of the students taking these programmes are international students from over 80 countries.

=== Graduate studies ===
Students can choose from different types of Master programmes: (common) Master programmes, Research Master programmes or Post-experience Master programmes. Education at this level is given mostly in English.

==== Master's programmes ====
These types of Master's programmes lead to a M.A., MSc or LL.M. degree.

==== Research Master's programmes ====
Talented graduates are given the opportunity to utilise their skills and potential in academic research. To be eligible for a Research Master, a bachelor's or master's degree must have been obtained.

==== Post-experience and professional Master's programmes ====
The university also offers specialised knowledge and skills programmes for further development of one's professional career. These types of programmes leads to the commonly known M.A. or MSc, but also to professional master's degree's like MBA, MFM (Master in Financial Management), or MHM.

=== Research doctoral programmes ===
In addition, most departments, affiliated (research) institutes or faculties offer doctorate programs or positions, leading to the 'Doctor of Philosophy' (PhD) degree. Most of the PhD programs offered by the university are concentrated in several research schools or institutes.

=== Erasmus Honours Academy ===
Erasmus University offers special honours programmes.

Students are invited to take part if their first-year grades are well above average and if they have proved themselves to be sufficiently motivated. The programmes are either disciplinary: special programmes for the very best students of one departments, or interdisciplinary: one of the Erasmus Honours Programme-tracks, where the very best students of the different faculties of the Erasmus University investigate, discuss, and tackle crucial contemporary scientific and societal questions from various perspectives.

After successfully completing the honours-programme, students receive a Honours-certificate and a Letter of Recommendation from the dean of their respective Faculty, or the Rector Magnificus of the EUR.

== Notable staff ==
=== Nobel Memorial Prize in Economic Sciences laureates ===
- Jan Tinbergen (recipient of the inaugural prize in 1969)

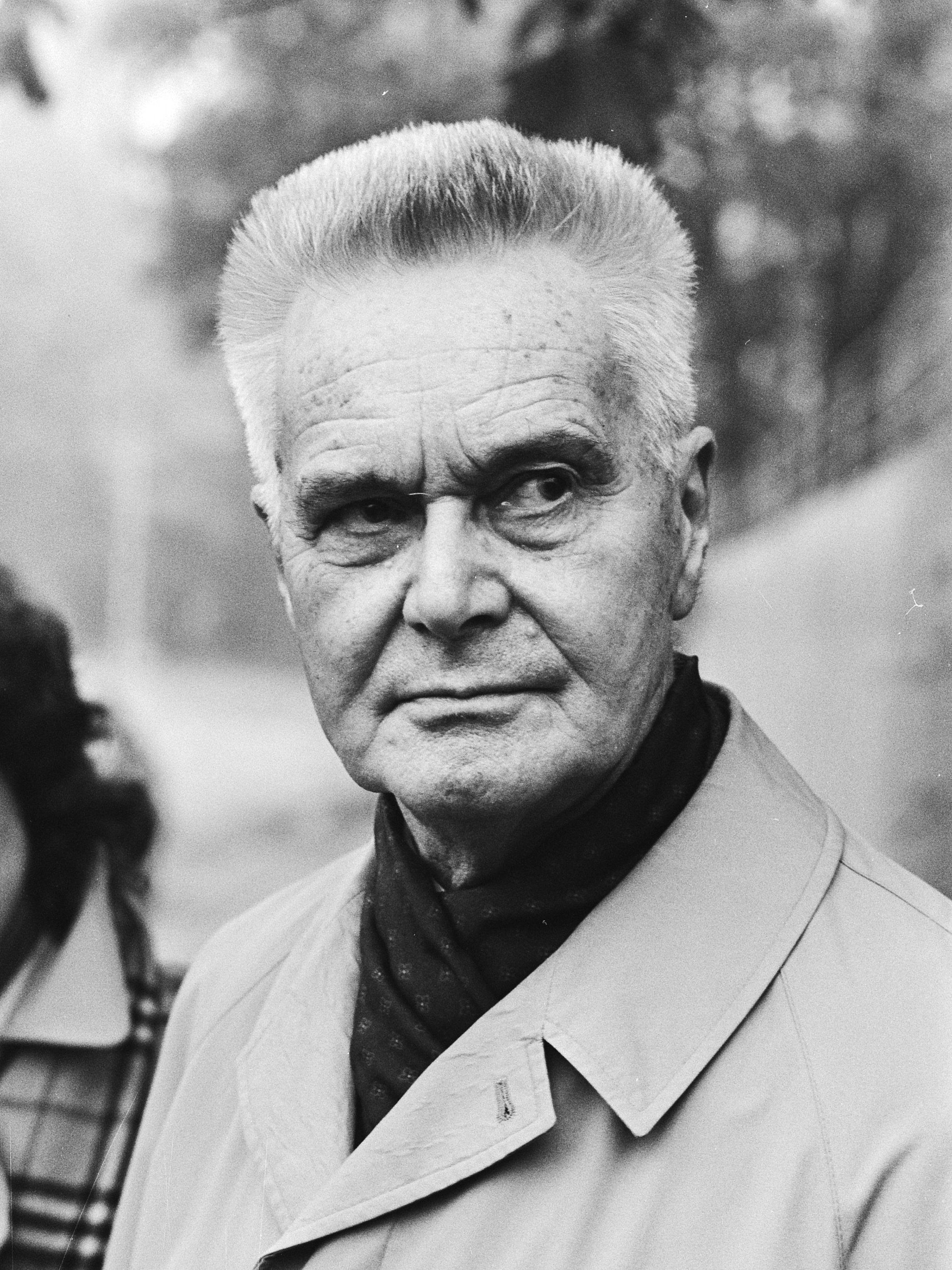
Jan Tinbergen was awarded the first Nobel Memorial Prize in Economic Sciences in 1969.

- Guido Imbens (recipient in 2021)

=== Politics ===
- Jan Peter Balkenende (former Prime Minister of the Netherlands)
- Pim Fortuyn (politician)
- Alexander Rinnooy Kan (former president of the Dutch Social-Economic Council)
- Jo Ritzen (former Dutch Minister of Education, Culture and Science; alumnus as well)
- Cees Veerman (former Dutch Minister of Agriculture, Nature and Food Quality)

=== Business ===
- Hans Wijers (former CEO of AkzoNobel; former Dutch Minister of Economic Affairs)

=== Scientists ===
- Eelco van Asperen (computer scientist)
- Klaas Bom (medical engineer and inventor of the portable ultrasound scanner)
- Michael Braungart (chemist holding the Cradle-to-Cradle chair)
- Frank Grosveld (molecular biologist, recipient of Spinoza Prize in 1995)
- Jan Hoeijmakers (molecular biologist, recipient of Spinoza Prize in 1998)
- Albert Osterhaus (virologist and influenza expert; head of the National Influenza Centre, and head of the world reference center for measles of the World Health Organization)
- Gerrit van Poelje (founder of the Public Administration in the Netherlands)
- Mihir Rakshit (economist known for his work on fiscal and monetary policy related to the developing economy)
- Eric Steegers (obstetrician and gynaecologist; professor of social obstetrics)
- Henri Theil (successor of Jan Tinbergen; together with Jan Tinbergen founder of the Econometric Institute in 1956)

=== Philosophy ===
- Luce Irigaray (feminist theorist)

== Notable alumni ==
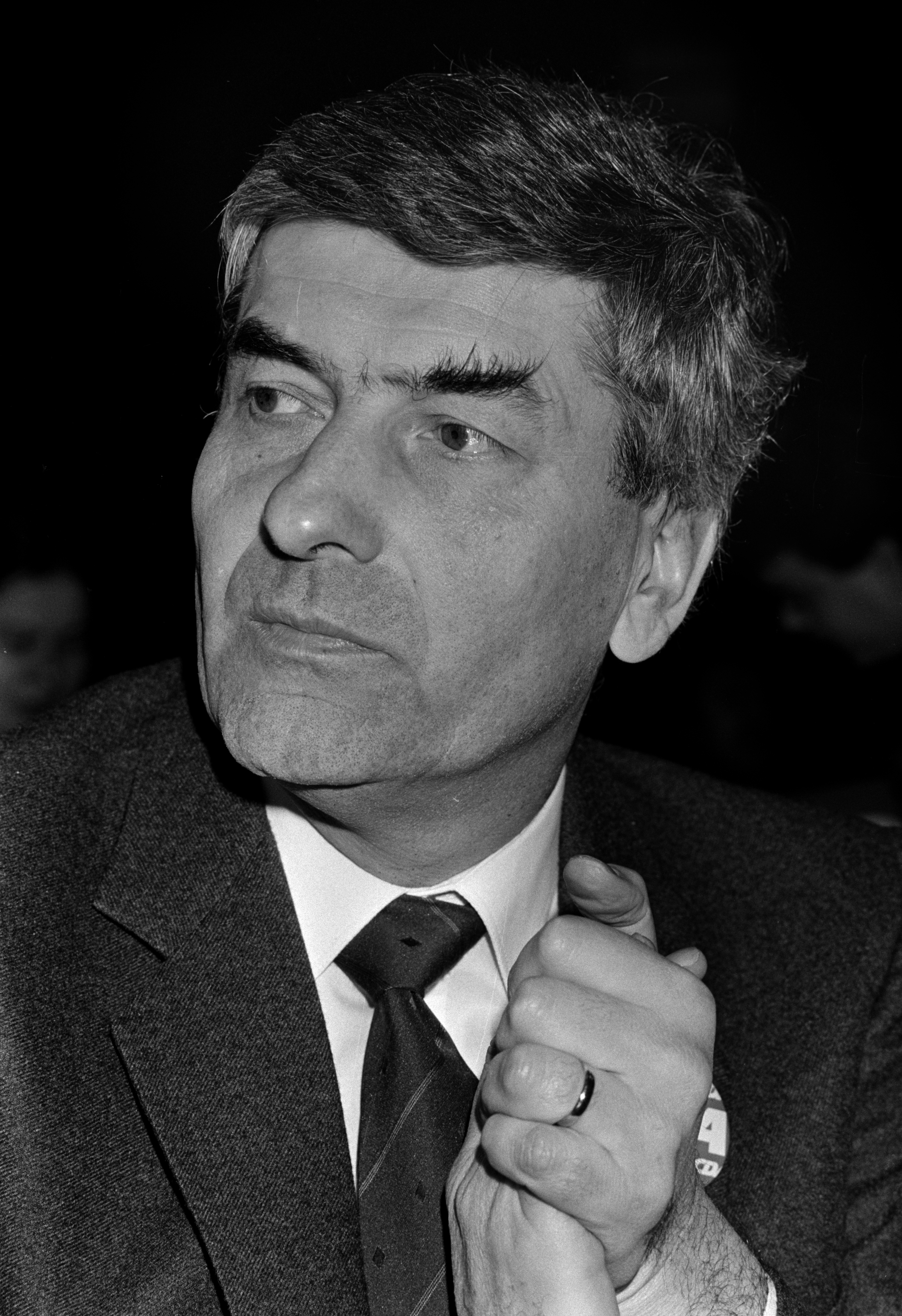
Ruud Lubbers

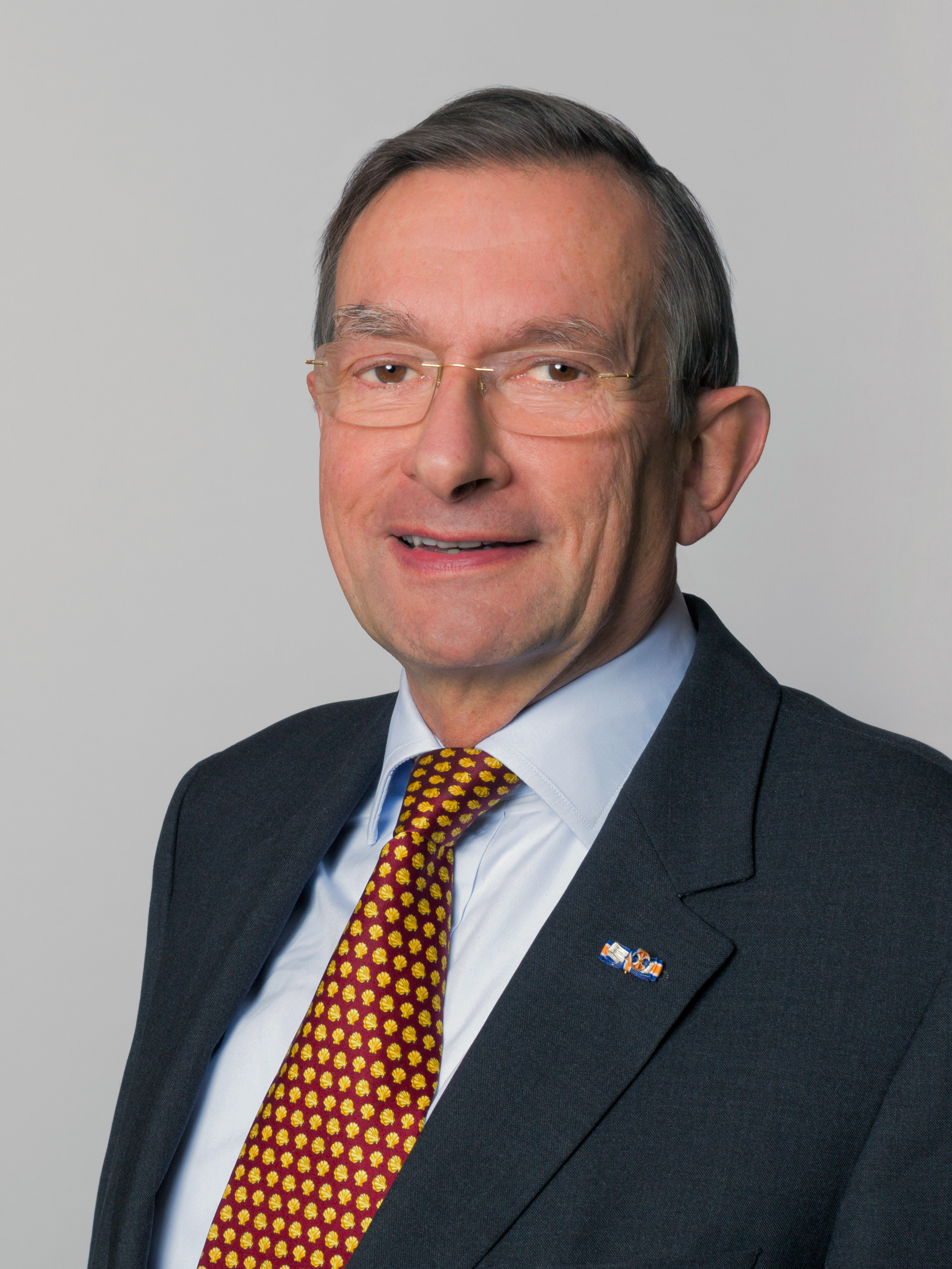
Jeroen van der Veer

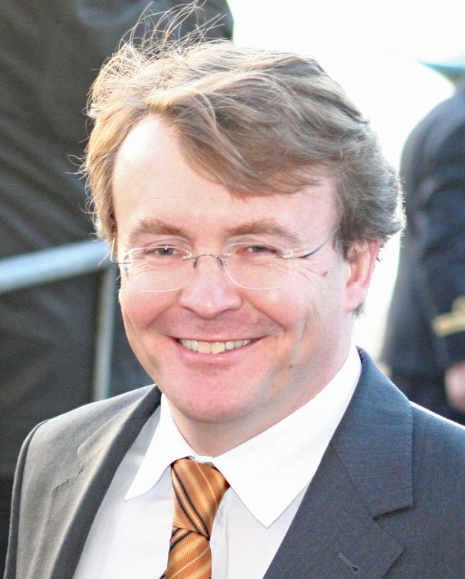
Prince Friso of Orange-Nassau

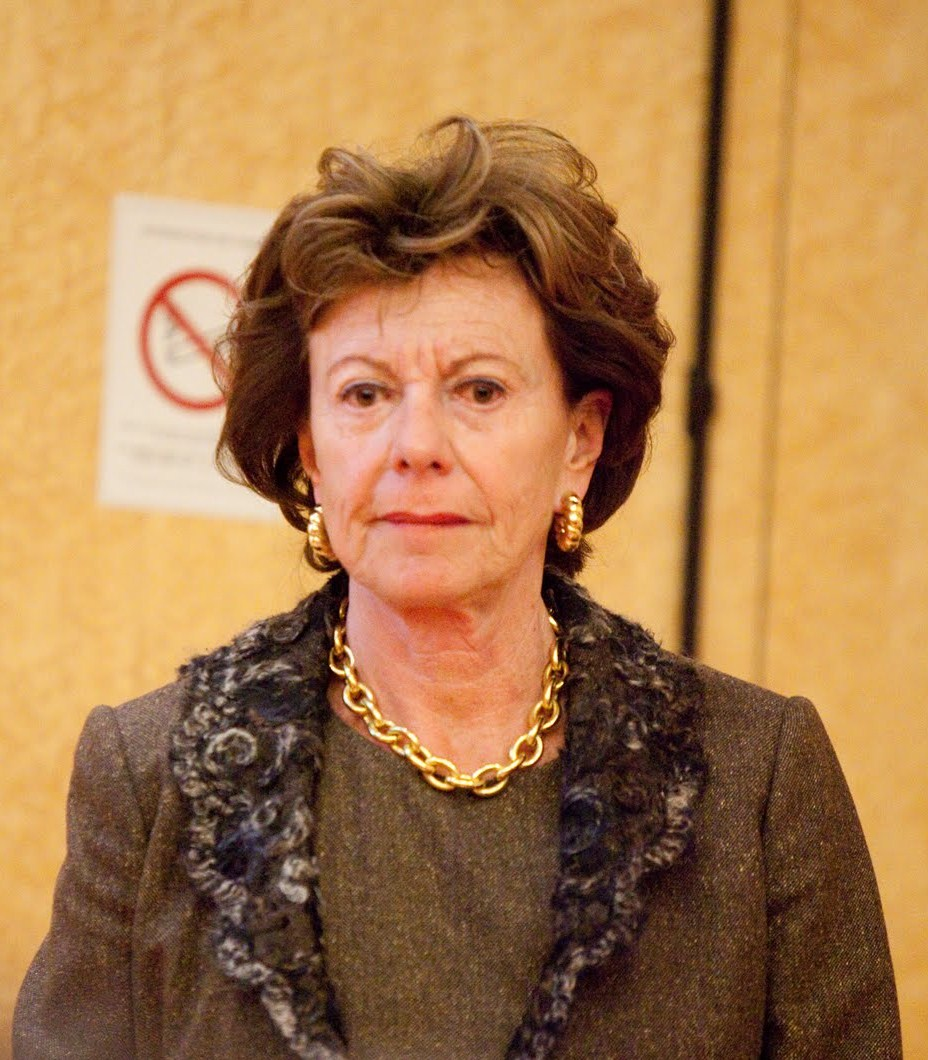
Neelie Kroes

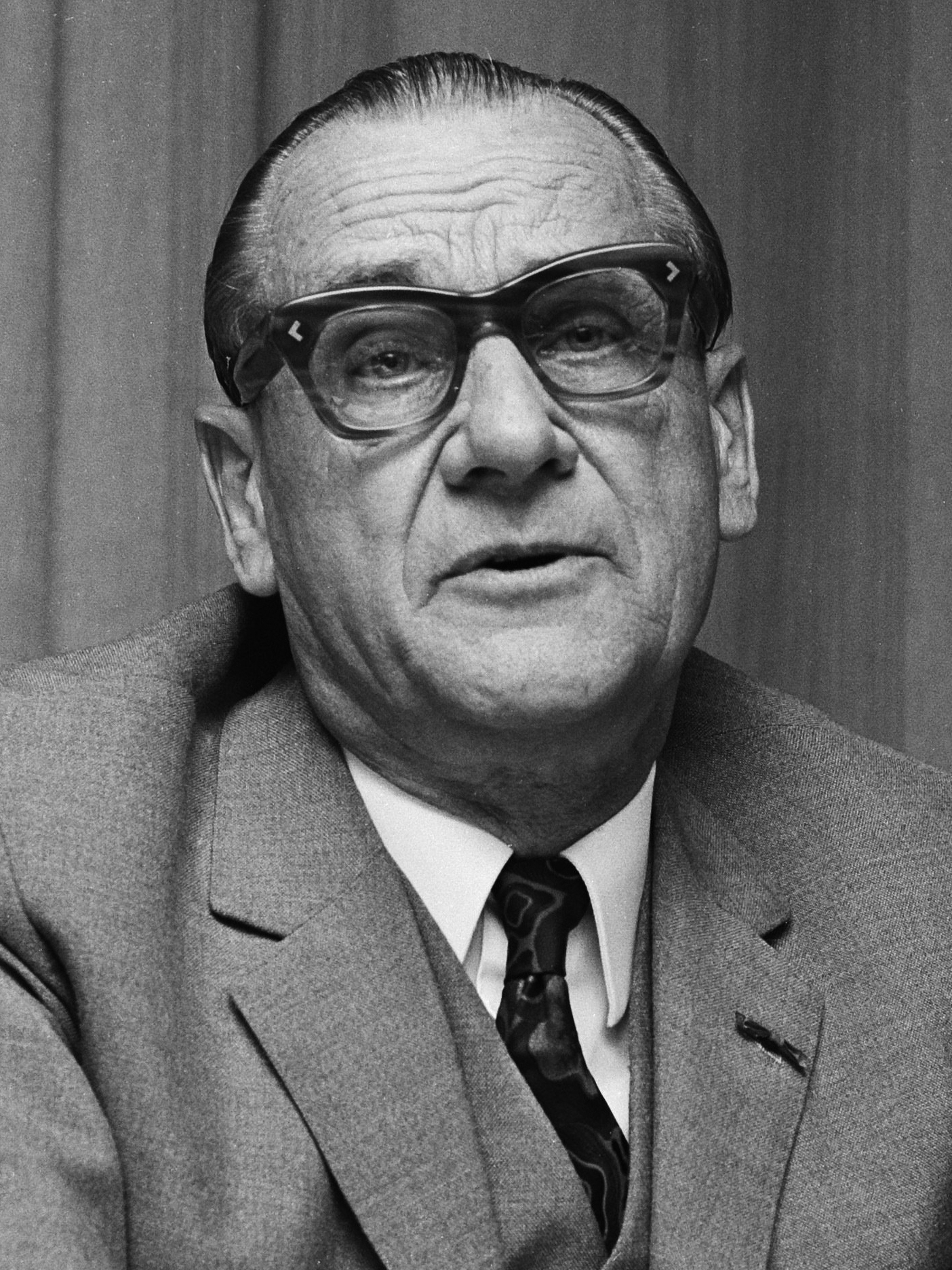
Albert Winsemius

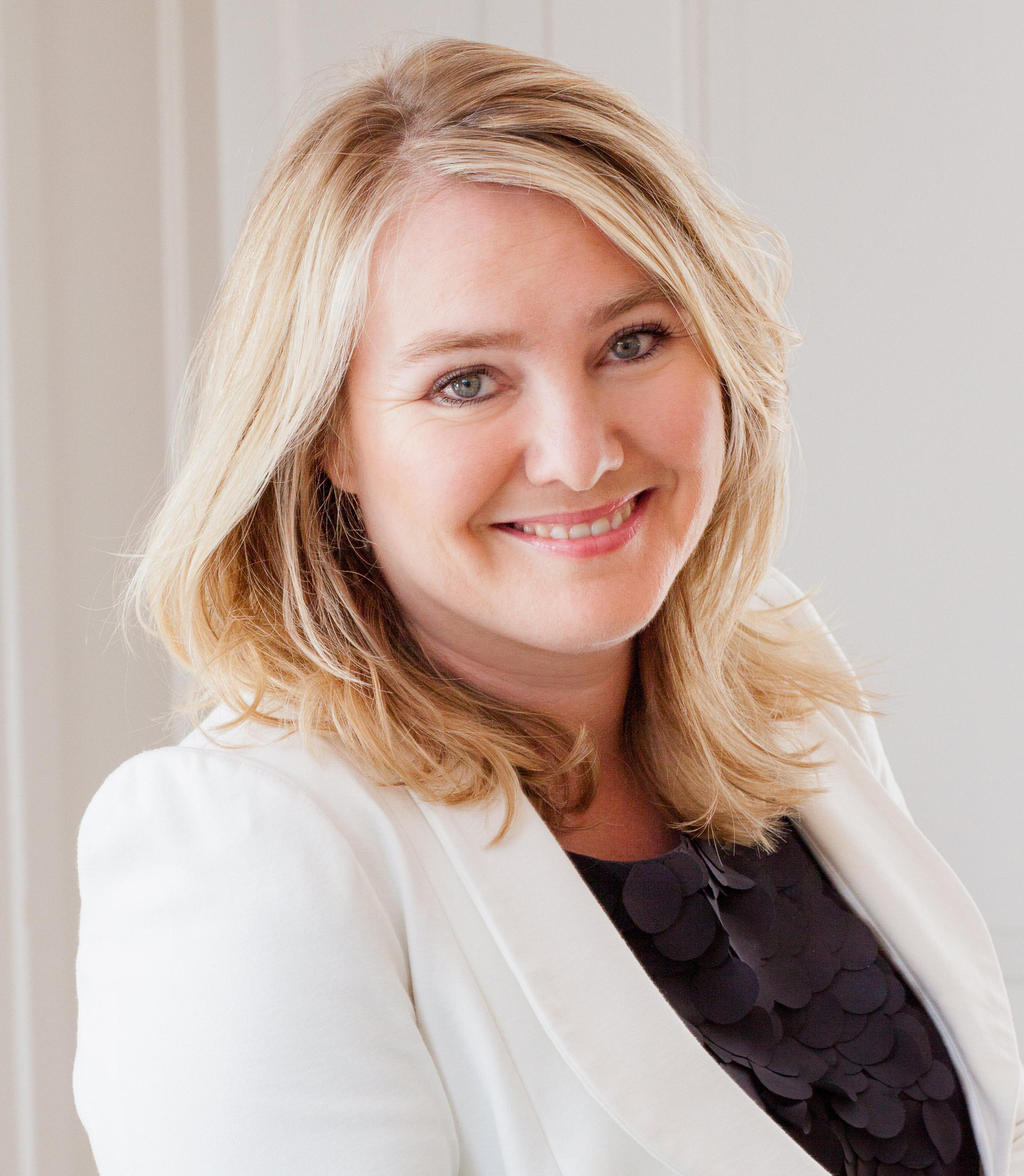
Melanie Schultz van Haegen

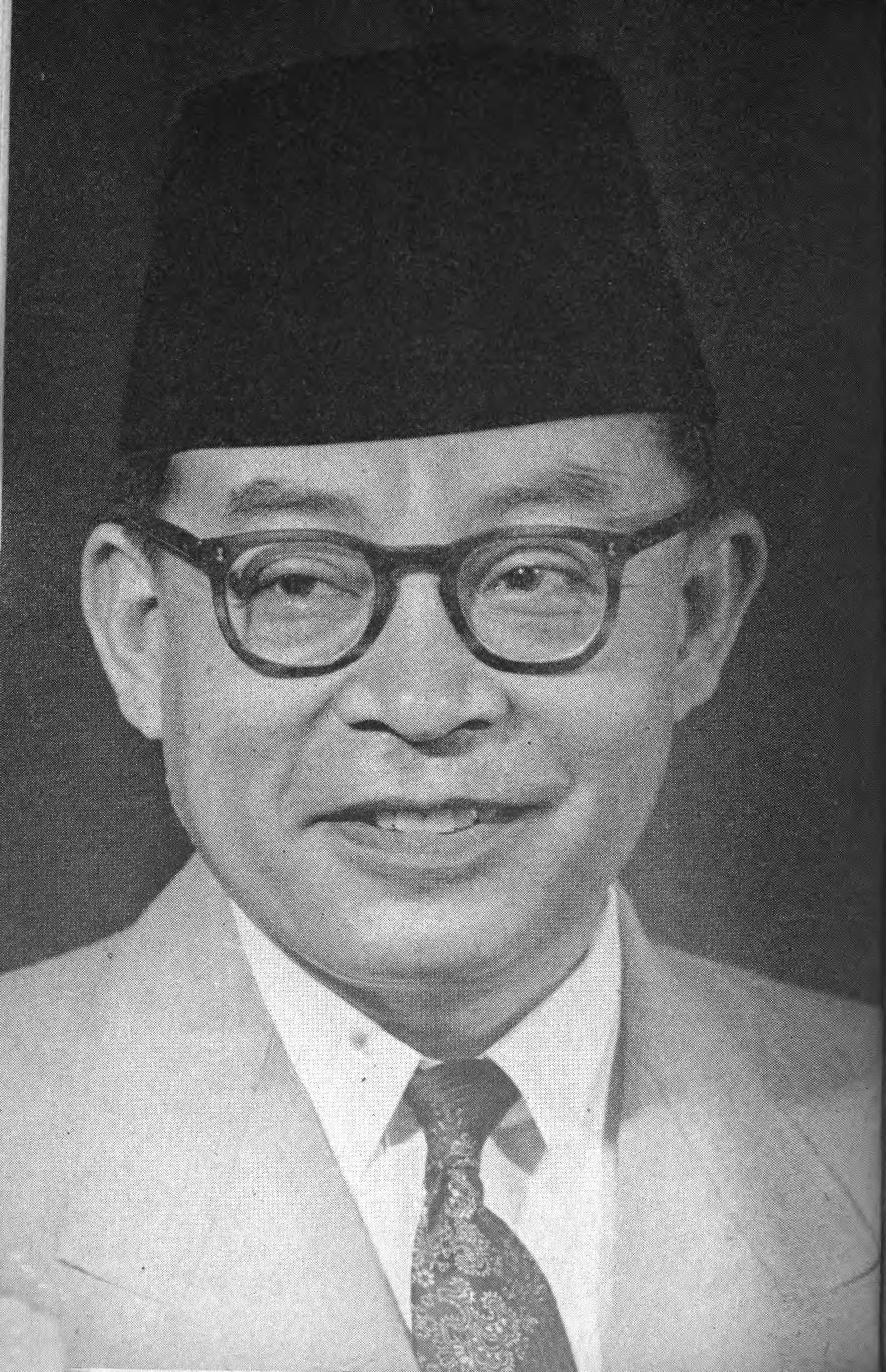
Mohammad Hatta

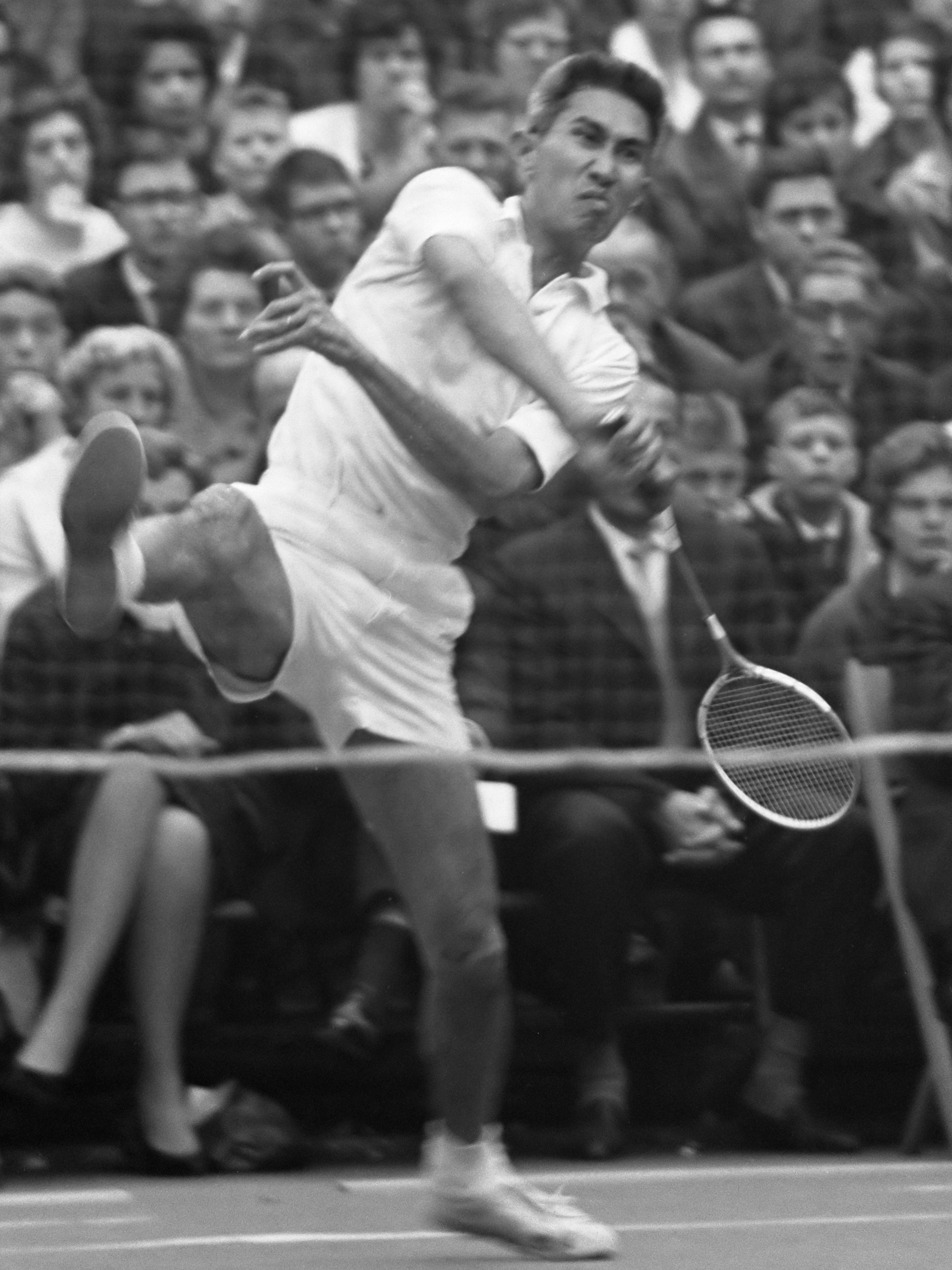
Ferry Sonneville

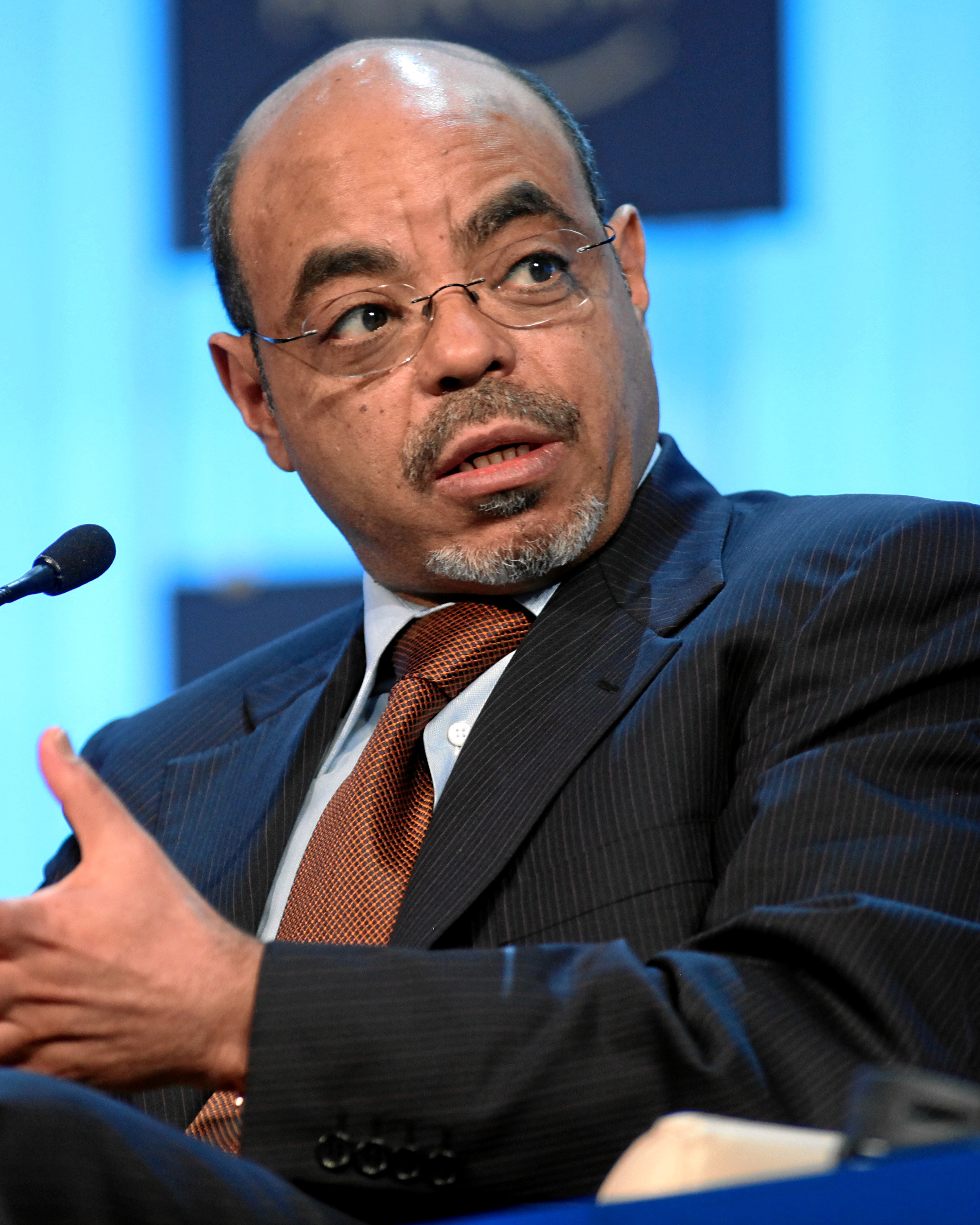
Meles Zenawi

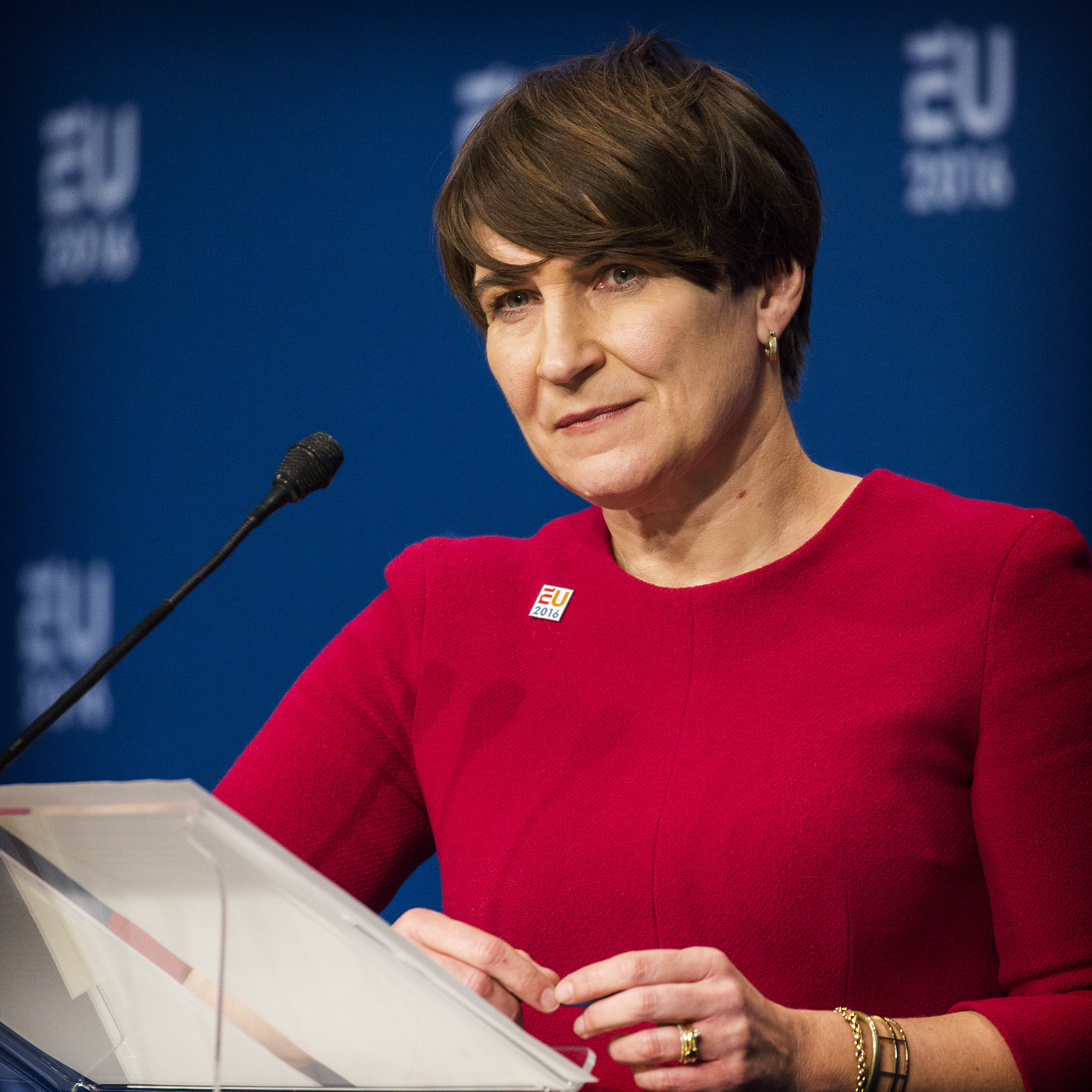
Lilianne Ploumen

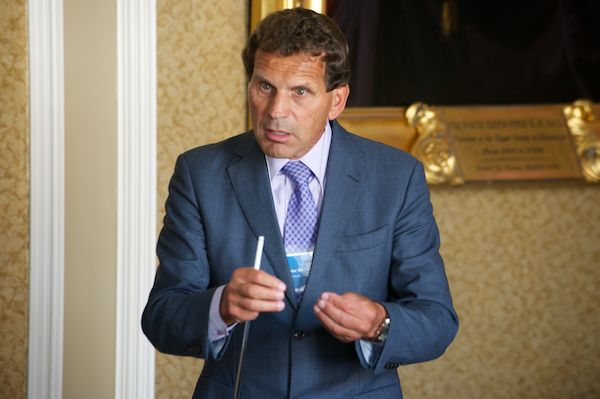
Peter Nijkamp

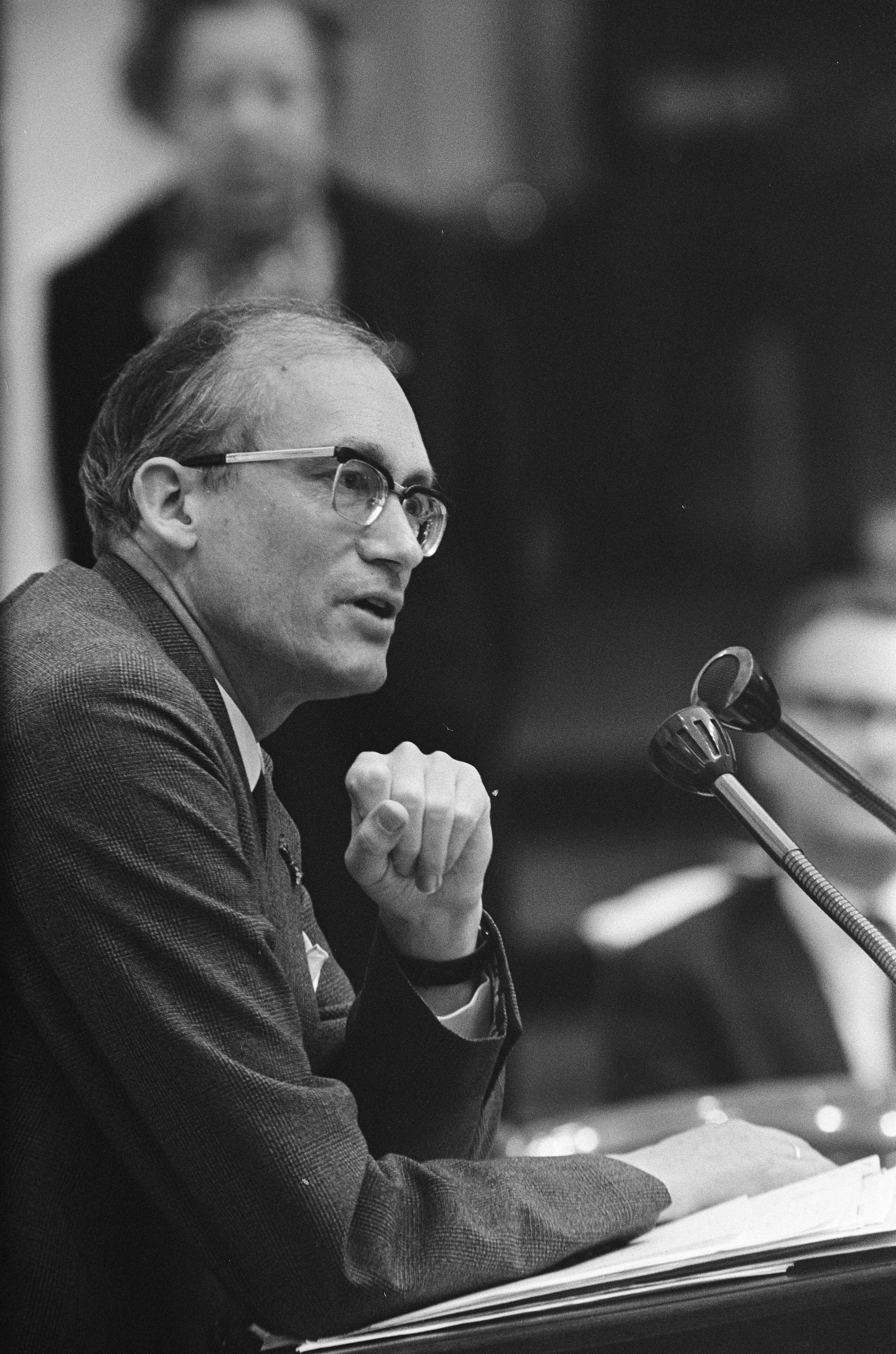
Johan Witteveen

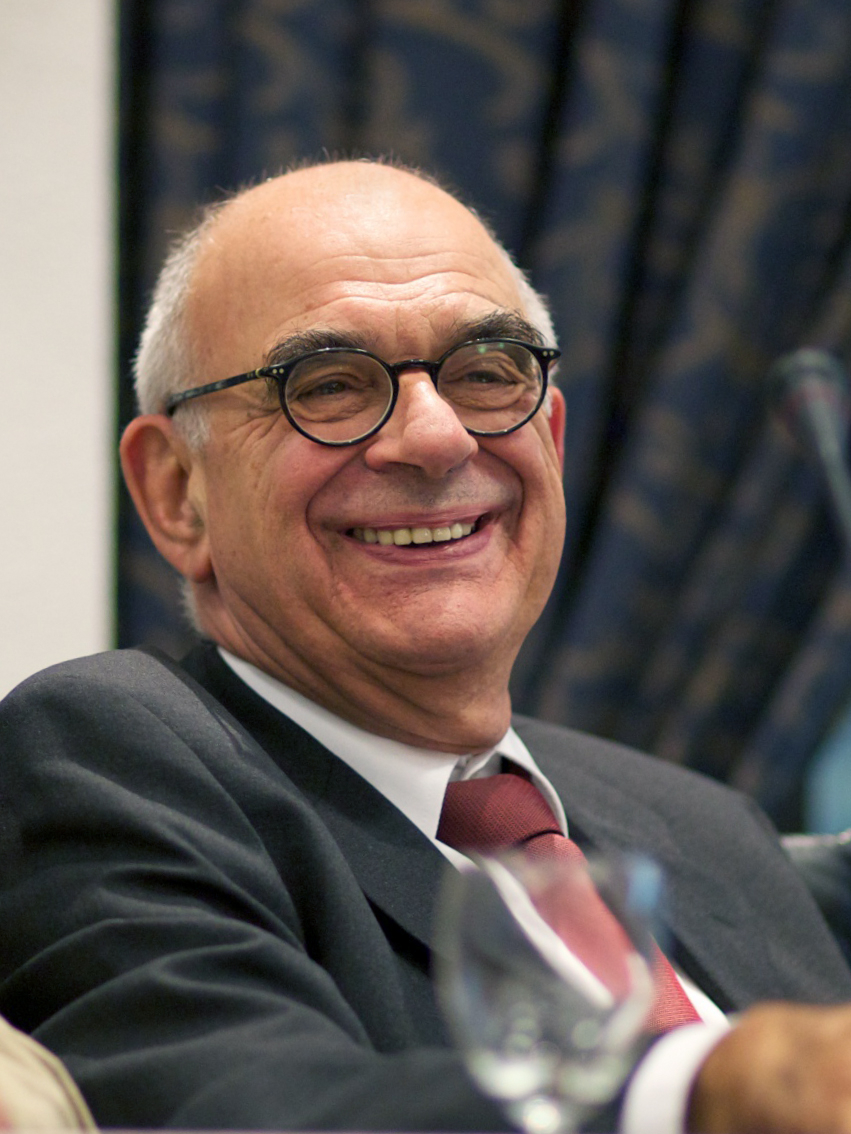
Jan Pronk

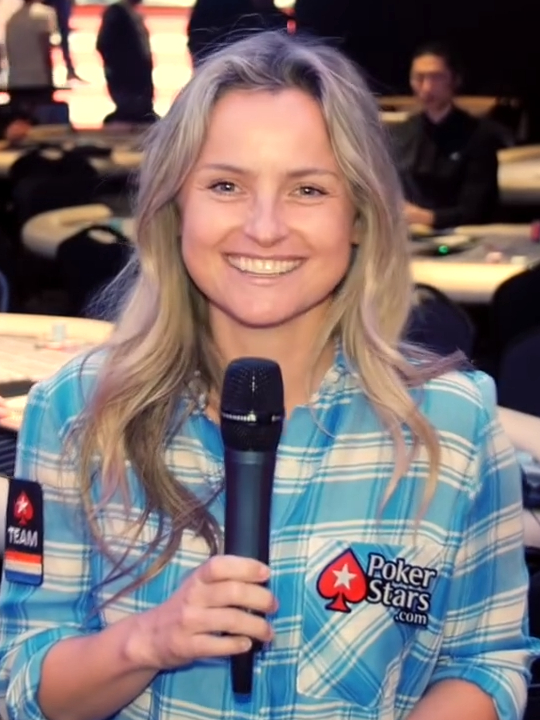
Fatima Moreira de Melo

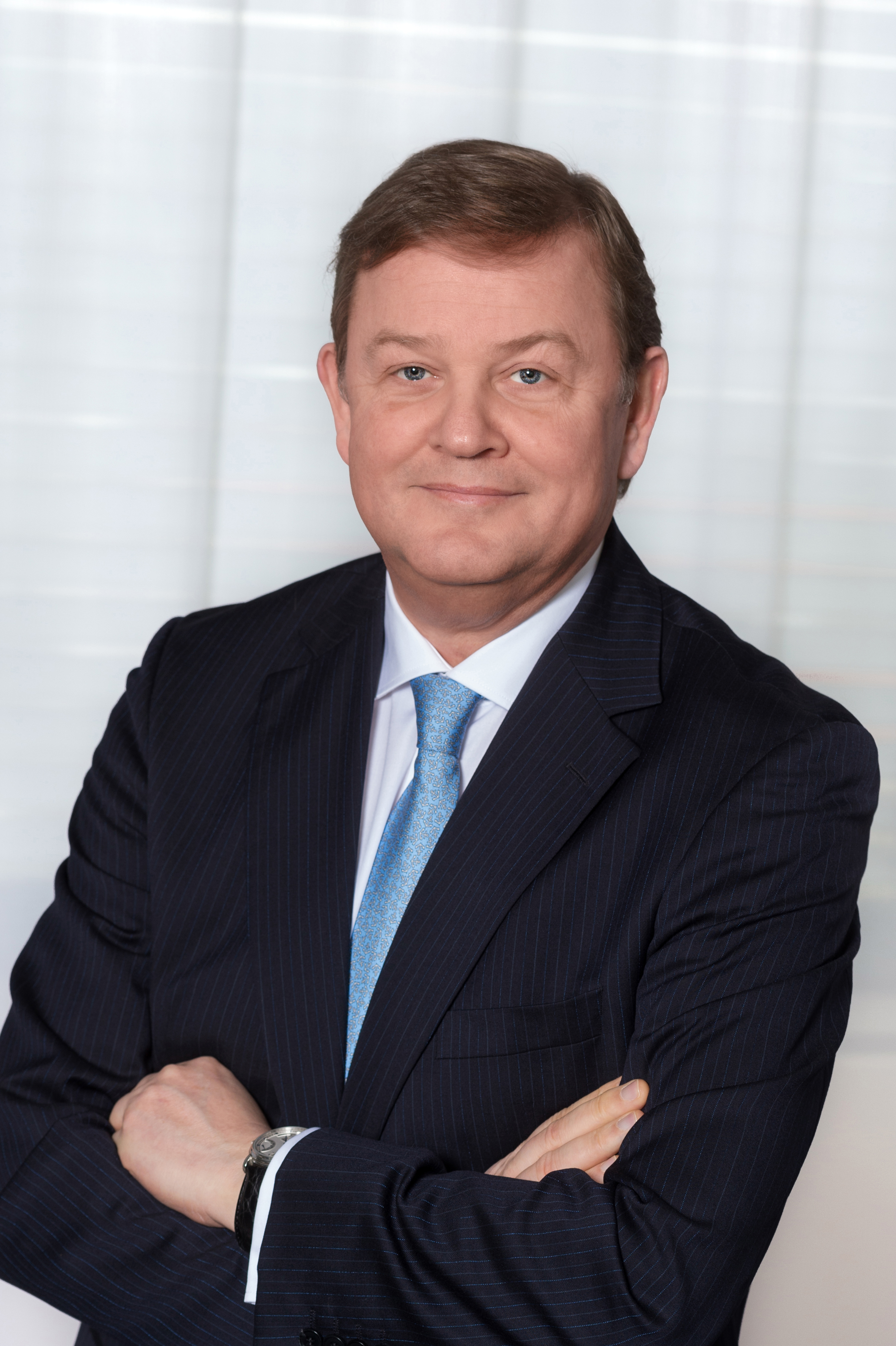
Feike Sijbesma

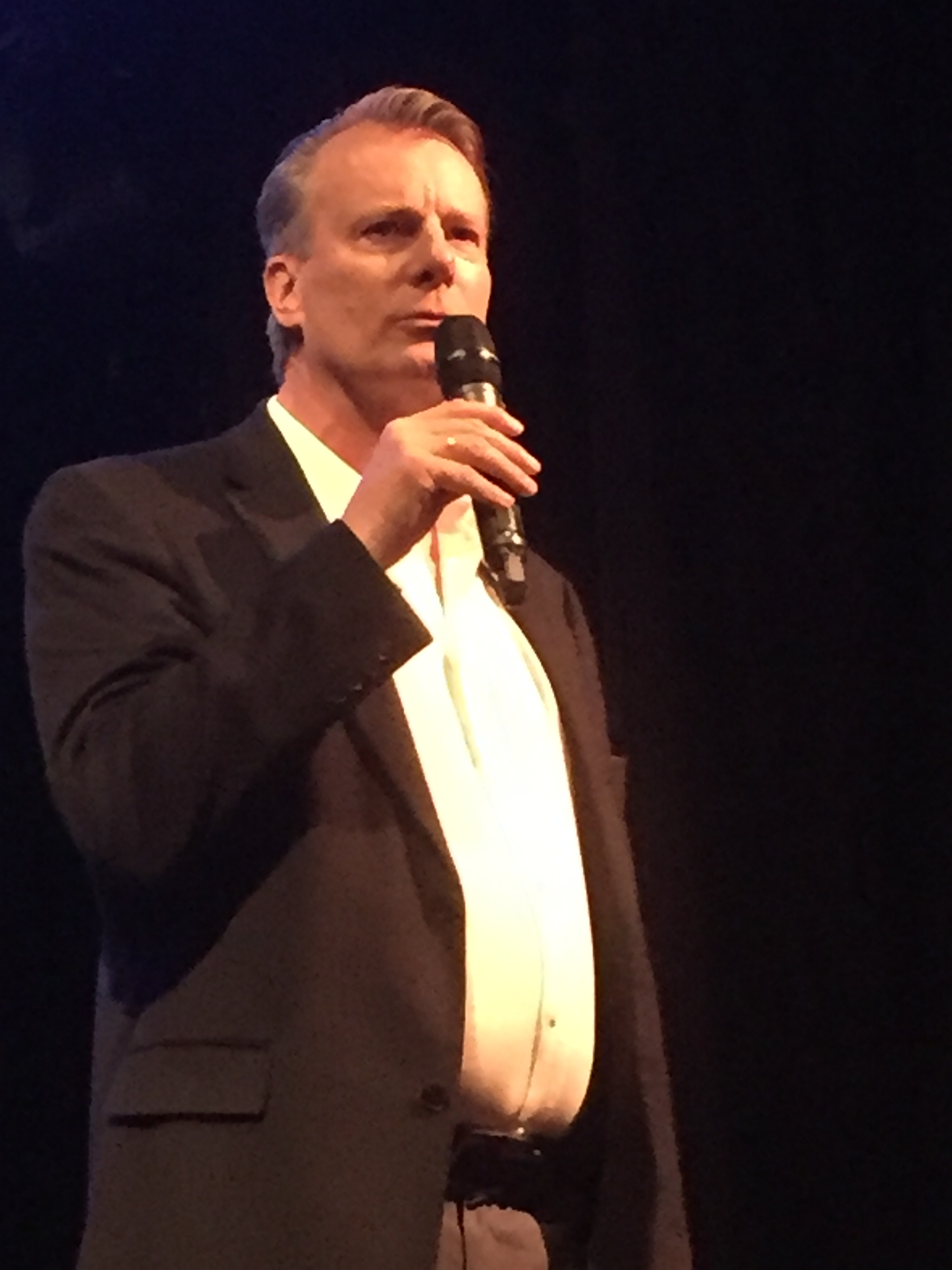
Johan Andresen

Heads of government

- Mohammad Hatta (a proclamator of Indonesia's independence, 1st vice-president and prime minister of the Republic of Indonesia)
- Ruud Lubbers (former Dutch Prime Minister and UN High Commissioner)
- Meles Zenawi (former Prime minister of the Federal Democratic Republic of Ethiopia)
- Jelle Zijlstra (former Prime Minister of the Netherlands, former President of De Nederlandsche Bank)

Business leaders

- Johan H. Andresen Jr. (CEO, Ferd)
- Peter Bakker (CEO, TNT N.V.)
- Bart Becht (CEO, Reckitt Benckiser)
- Bob van Dijk (CEO, Naspers)
- Kees Storm (Chairman, AB InBev)
- Peter Hartman (CEO, KLM)
- Cor Herkströter (former chairman Royal Dutch Shell, President Commissioner of the ING Group)
- Frans van Houten (CEO, Philips)
- Durk Jager (CEO, Procter & Gamble)
- Joop Bakker (CEO, Aegon N.V.)
- Frank Slootman (CEO, Snowflake Inc., former CEO of ServiceNow)
- Bé Udink (CEO, the Overseas Gas and Electric Company)
- Frans Muller (CEO, Ahold Delhaize Group)
- Martin van Rijn (CEO, PGGM Pension Fund)
- Feike Sijbesma (CEO, DSM N.V.)
- Henri Termeer (former president, CEO and chairman of Genzyme)
- Jeroen van der Veer (Chairman of Philips, former CEO of Royal Dutch Shell)
- Hans Wijers (former CEO of AkzoNobel)
- Charles Woodburn (CEO, BAE Systems)
- Frank van Zanten (CEO, Bunzl)
- Peter Stas (CEO, Frédérique Constant)
- John Tsioris (CEO, Instashop)

Economists and researchers

- Antoine van Agtmael (former economist of the World Bank; coined the term emerging markets)
- Sandra Phlippen (chief economist of ABN AMRO Bank)
- Stijn Claessens (head of financial stability policy department of the Bank for International Settlements)
- Stephen Groff (economist and Governor of the National Development Fund of Saudi Arabia)
- Ashok Mitra (chief economic adviser of Government of India)
- Guido Imbens (winner of the Nobel Prize in Economic Sciences in 2021)
- Kwik Kian Gie (Indonesian economist and former Coordinating Minister for Economic Affairs)
- Peter Nijkamp (professor of regional economics, recipient of the Spinoza Prize in 1996)
- Supachai Panitchpakdi (WTO Director-General, 2002–2005)
- Radius Prawiro (governor of Central Bank of Indonesia)
- Erik Thorbecke (development economist)
- Jan Tinbergen (first winner of the Nobel Memorial Prize in Economic Sciences)
- Nout Wellink (former President of De Nederlandsche Bank)
- Albert Winsemius (long-time economic advisor to Singapore)
- Johan Witteveen (managing director IMF, 1973–1978 and first chairman of the Group of Thirty)

Politicians

- Eduard Bomhoff (former Dutch Minister of Health, Welfare and Sport and Deputy Prime Minister)
- Sumitro Djojohadikusumo (former Indonesian Minister of Finance)
- Aart Jan de Geus (former deputy secretary-general of the OECD and former Minister of Social Affairs and Employment of the Netherlands)
- Herman Heinsbroek (former Minister of Economic Affairs; founder, Arcade Records)
- Jan Kees de Jager (former Dutch Minister of Finance)
- Zoran Jolevski (former Macedonian Ambassador to the United States and negotiator of Macedonia naming dispute)
- Neelie Kroes (former European Commissioner)
- Yurii Lubkovych (former Secretary of State of the Ministry of Internal Affairs of Ukraine)
- Lilianne Ploumen (former minister for Foreign Trade and Development Cooperation 2012–2017; member House of Representatives; studied social history)
- Jan Pronk (former Minister for Development Cooperation and Minister of Housing, Spatial Planning and the Environment)
- Ronald van Raak (member House of Representatives of the Netherlands and non-fiction writer; studied social history and philosophy)
- Onno Ruding (former vice-chairman, Citibank; former board member, ABN AMRO; former Minister of Finance in the Netherlands; former executive director of the IMF)
- Melanie Schultz van Haegen (former Minister of Infrastructure and the Environment)
- Cees Veerman (former Minister of Agriculture, Nature and Food Quality)
- Frans Weisglas (former president of the House of Representatives of the Netherlands)
- Paul Zimmerman (councillor, Hong Kong's Southern District Council)

Others

- Stefan Aartsen (former Dutch butterfly swimmer)
- Jacques Cohen (embryologist, director at reprogenetics)
- Maria Lynn Ehren (Miss Universe Thailand 2017)
- Simon Groot (Dutch agronomist)
- Julia Kotlarsky (New Zealand academic in information systems and outsourcing)
- Fatima Moreira de Melo (former Dutch field hockey international)
- Prince Johan-Friso of Orange-Nassau (2nd son of Queen Beatrix of the Netherlands)
- Maria Oudeman, Dutch businesswoman and former President of Utrecht University (MBA, joint with University of Rochester, New York)
- Drs. P (singer and writer)
- Sander Schimmelpenninck, opinion writer & -commentator, and television presenter
- Ferry Sonneville (former Indonesian badminton player)
- Marianne Thieme (Dutch animal activist and politician)
- Samuel Kofi Woods (Liberian human rights activist and journalist)
