= Kotlyarsky =

Kotlyarsky, Kotlarsky, Kotlarski, etc. is an East Slavic surname. Feminine forms: Kotlarska, Kotlarskaya. Notable people with the surname include:

- Agnieszka Kotlarska (model) (1972–1996), the first Polish winner of the Miss International beauty pageant
- Agnieszka Kotlarska (actress) (1971–2015), Polish film and stage actress
- Julia Kotlarsky
- Moshe Kotlarsky
- Vladislav Kotlyarsky
