= Maria Oudeman =

Maria Johanna (Marjan) Oudema (born 1958) was president of Utrecht University until 2017. As of 2018, she was also a director of the Concertgebouw, the Rijksmuseum, Solvay SA, Aalberts (then Aalberts Industries) and SHV Holdings and was a director of Norwegian oil and gas company Equinor (formerly Statoil) from 2012 until 2018. She was previously a member of the executive committee of Akzo Nobel and executive director Strip Products Division at Corus Group (now Tata Steel Europe).

She has a law degree from the University of Groningen and a Master of Business Administration from the University of Rochester (New York) and Erasmus University Rotterdam.
