= Kees Storm =

Dutch businessman (born 1942)

Kornelis Jan "Kees" Storm (born 1942) is a Dutch businessman.

== Biography ==
Kees Storm was born in Amsterdam, The Netherlands, in 1942. He received an M.A. in business economics from Erasmus University Rotterdam in 1969.

Storm started his career as an accountant at Moret & Limperg in 1970. In 1976, he was appointed to the executive board of Kon Scholten-Honig. From 1993 to 2002, he served as chairman of the board of Aegon, a life insurance company, where he still serves on the supervisory board. He is chairman of the supervisory board of KLM and Pon Holdings and board member at Unilever, Anheuser-Busch InBev and Baxter International.

Storm is married and has two children.
