= Terason =

- Type: Private
- Industry: Medical Ultrasound
- Founded: 1994; 32 years ago
- Founder: Alice Chiang
- Headquarters: Burlington, Massachusetts, U.S.
- Area served: Worldwide
- Key people: Alice Chiang (Chairman & CEO)
- Products: Medical Imaging, uSmart 3300, uSmart3200T
- Revenue: N/A
- Owner: Private (100%)
- Number of employees: 100+ (2016)
- Subsidiaries: Teratech Corporation
- Website: www.terason.com

Terason, a division of Teratech Corporation, is a global medical ultrasound imaging company headquartered in Burlington, Massachusetts, USA. Terason was the first to patent color portable ultrasound and is a market leader in ultrasound-guided venous intervention. Terason produces portable ultrasound products and technologies and has provided ultrasound systems to clinicians, hospitals, outpatient centers, and OEM partners since 2000.

== History ==
Terason, a division of Teratech Corporation, began in 1994. Alice Chiang founded the company to apply developments in the fields of radar, sonar and telecommunications technologies to the demanding requirements of battlefield ultrasound. Recognizing that decades of breakthrough research for the U.S. Department of Defense could be applied to the challenges of mainstream ultrasound imaging, Dr. Chiang formed the Terason division. With initial key patents protecting the integrated circuit technology she developed at MIT Lincoln Laboratory, Dr. Chiang dedicated the Terason division to the development of a micro-miniaturized commercial ultrasound system.

Terason has shipped thousands of ultrasound systems to clinicians, hospitals, outpatient centers, and OEM partners since 2000. Terason systems are routinely used in the fields of vascular surgery, interventional radiology, endocrinology and nephrology, cardiology, musculoskeletal (MSK) and breast surgery. More recently, Terason was the first company to turn a laptop (MacBook Pro) into an ultrasound machine.

In September 2016, the French CNES’s (Centre National d’Etudes Spatiales) Cardiospace mission was launched from China’s Jiuquan Satellite Launch Center aboard the new TianGong-2 orbital module. The France-China Cardiospace mission will be studying how astronauts’ cardiovascular system adapts to microgravity conditions and is deconditioned on their return to Earth. Terason's was chosen as the scanner of choice for this important mission. CNES coordinated development of the instruments making up Cardiospace, in particular Terason's Doppler laser and ultrasound scanner that will measure micro-circulation and macro-circulation. The intuitive nature of the Terason 3200 system, coupled with the lightweight, small footprint and crystal clear imagery, will yield a wealth of scientific data that could serve to determine new joint space missions for China's future space station.

In late 2016, Terason received a 10-year contract worth a maximum of $100 million from the U.S. Department of Defense (DOD) Defense Logistics Agency. The fixed-price, indefinite-delivery/indefinite-quantity contract for ultrasound systems includes a five-year base contract with one five-year option period, according to the DOD. Customers will include the DOD, the Department of Veterans Affairs, other federal civilian agencies, and foreign governments through the DOD foreign military sales program.

== Technology ==
Terason has a signal processor designed to provide clear images, where the images are produced by proprietary algorithms and firmware. Terason's uSmart portable ultrasound systems provide next-generation Enhanced Needle Visualization (ENV) and Terascape Panoramic Imaging.

Terason systems use a Windows-based operating system for image processing, reporting, communication, and system integration. Terason's systems can be integrated into an existing communication infrastructure or can operate as standalone workstations within hospitals or at remote locations. uConnect™ is a remote diagnostic program from Terason that connects the consumer directly to a Terason support representative.

Terason's signal processor was designed provide the clear images that reveal details, level of contrast, and subtlety. The images are generated by proprietary algorithms and firmware. Terason's uSmart portable ultrasound systems offer next-generation Enhanced Needle Visualization (ENV) and Terascape Panoramic Imaging. The ENV works with all needle gauges and has a 15L transducer solution.

Terason systems use a Windows-based operating system for image processing, reporting, communication and system integration. Terason's systems can be integrated into an existing communication infrastructure or can operate as standalone workstations within hospitals or at remote locations. uConnect™ is a remote diagnostic program from Terason that connects the consumer directly to a Terason support representative.

== Uses ==
Terason has the third largest market share in ultrasound point-of-care business in the U.S., currently targeting the following therapeutic markets:

- Anesthesia
- Breast
- Cardiology
- Critical Care
- Emergency Medicine
- Endocrinology Medicine
- Endocrinology
- Military
- Mobile
- Musculoskeletal
- OB/GYN
- Phlebology
- PICC Line
- Radiology/IR
- Vascular
