= Portable ultrasound =

Modality of medical ultrasonography

Portable ultrasound is a modality of medical ultrasonography that utilizes small and light devices, compared to the console-style ultrasound machines that preceded them. In most cases these mobile ultrasound systems could be carried by hand and in some cases even operated for a time on battery power alone. The first portable ultrasound machines arrived in the early 1980s but battery powered systems that could be easily carried did not arrive until the late 1990s.

== History ==
The ADR 2130, designed by Marty Wilcox was the first portable ultrasound unit commercially available in the United States, being released in 1975. This unit weighed about 25 lbs, had 3 linear probes to choose from and used an oscilloscope for a display instead of a TV monitor. ADR was later purchased by ATL which later spun off its portable technology into a company that became Sonosite. ATL was later purchased by Philips while Sonosite came out with its first battery powered portable offering, the Sonosite 180 released in 1998. Previous to this, Ecton produced a low-cost portable cardiac ultrasound system that could be carried by hand in March 1998, called the Sonnet but the test prototypes were never put into full-scale production because of difficulty finding venture capital. Ecton was purchased by Acuson in 1999 and the Sonnet system was released as the Acuson Cypress Cypress portable ultrasound system in 2000. The first battery powered portable was the Organon Teknika MiniVisor produced in 1979, but which saw only limited production. The device was created by a team led by Klaas Bom of the Erasmus MC and Organon Teknika. The first dual-touch screen portable the Hyperion ultrasound system distributed through Graydon Pierce Imaging is designed specifically for the most hostile and demanding medical environments – Military Medical Applications (MEDCOM), Emergency Medical Services, Trauma Centers and Humanitarian Relief Operations. Recently GE has come out with the VScan and Vscan dual probe, which offer almost a micro-ultrasound. Importantly, its price point is such that they can be issued to individual physicians.

=== Color Portable Ultrasound ===
In 1994, Alice Chiang, through technology she developed at MIT, patented the first color portable ultrasound. Transferring the applications of radar, sonar, and telecommunications used by the U.S. Department of Defense. She founded Terason, a medical device technology company, increasing the availability of portable ultrasound imaging.

== Uses ==
Portable ultrasound machines are typically used in situations where space is limited, mobility is important, or the scanning must be done in the field. OB/GYN doctors were the first to start using portable ultrasound systems as these could be brought bedside or were affordable enough to be purchased by a private practice. Currently portable ultrasound machines are used in Cardiac, Vascular, Radiology, Endocrinology, Pediatric, Gastroenterology, Hepatology and OB/GYN applications. In addition, EMS personnel from several countries including Germany, Italy, France, and the United States have used portable ultrasound evaluations in the field.
