= Bob van Dijk =

Dutch businessman and CEO of Naspers

- Born: 1972 (age 53–54); Near Eindhoven, Netherlands
- Education: Erasmus University Rotterdam; INSEAD
- Occupation: Businessman
- Title: Group CEO, Naspers
- Term: April 2014 - September 2023

Bob van Dijk (born 1972) is a Dutch businessman, and the CEO of Naspers from April 2014 to September 2023.

He previously was the CEO of the Allegro division. Before working for Naspers, he worked for eBay. He began his business career as an associate at McKinsey & Company. He holds an MBA from INSEAD, and an MSc in econometrics from Erasmus University Rotterdam.
