= Jacques Cohen (embryologist) =

Dutch embryologist (born 1951)

- Born: 26 December 1951 (age 74); The Hague, Netherlands
- Education: Erasmus University; State University of Leiden
- Known for: reproductive medicine in-vitro fertilization cryopreservation
- Scientific career
- Fields: Embryology
- Workplaces: University of Cambridge; Cornell University; Reprogenetics; Althea

Jacques Cohen (born 26 December 1951) is a Dutch embryologist based in New York. He is a Director at Reprogenetics LLC, Laboratory Director at ART Institute of Washington at Walter Reed National Military Medical Center (a joint fertility program with NIH), and Scientific Director of R & D at IVF-online.

While working with Robert G. Edwards at Bourn Hall Clinic, Cambridge, Cohen investigated improving embryo implantation rates. Cohen has been involved in research on the application of micromanipulation techniques to operate on eggs, sperm and embryos. He co-developed partial zone dissection in human oocyte.

As of October 2024, he is listed as an Emeritus Chief Editor at Reproductive Biomedicine Online. He has also held faculty positions at Emory University, Cornell University Medical College, and the University of Connecticut.

== Early career and education ==
Cohen was born in The Hague, Netherlands. In 1970, he went to the State University of Leiden, where he received a BSc degree in Biochemistry and subsequently an MSc degree in Reproductive physiology in 1978. He attended the Erasmus University Rotterdam, where he obtained a PhD degree in Medicine in 1982, for his thesis "Interaction between human spermatozoa and hamster oocytes".

== Embryology ==
In 1982, Cohen joined Bourn Hall Clinic as an embryologist, working with Patrick Steptoe and Robert G. Edwards on techniques to improve human conception through in vitro fertilization (IVF). Robert G. Edwards was the recipient of the Nobel Prize for Medicine and Physiology in 2010. It was in Cambridge that Cohen first successfully froze and thawed a human blastocyst for use in IVF. Cohen also pioneered the use of micromanipulation techniques now widespread among embryologists. He developed a precursor technique of Intracytoplasmic Sperm Injection (ICSI), now used for the treatment of nearly all male factor infertility diagnoses. Assisted Hatching (AH) is another commonly applied technique aimed at increasing implantation rates among infertile couples. Some of his work, such as cytoplasmic transfer, an attempt to boost development using the cytoplasm of donor eggs to supplement eggs from certain infertility patients, and single sperm freezing, has caused considerable ethical debate.
