= Instashop =

E-commerce platform

instashop
- Type: Private Company
- Industry: E-commerce
- Founded: 2015
- Founder: Ioanna Angelidaki, John Tsioris
- Headquarters: Swiss Tower, JLT, Dubai UAE
- Area served: UAE Egypt
- Parent: talabat
- Website: instashop.com

instashop (Arabic: إنستاشوب) is an online marketplace in the UAE and Egypt, with its headquarters in Dubai, United Arab Emirates. Founded in 2015 as an online grocery delivery platform, in August 2020, instashop was acquired by Delivery Hero. In March 2026, instashop was fully acquired by talabat, Delivery Hero's MENA subsidiary.

== Overview ==
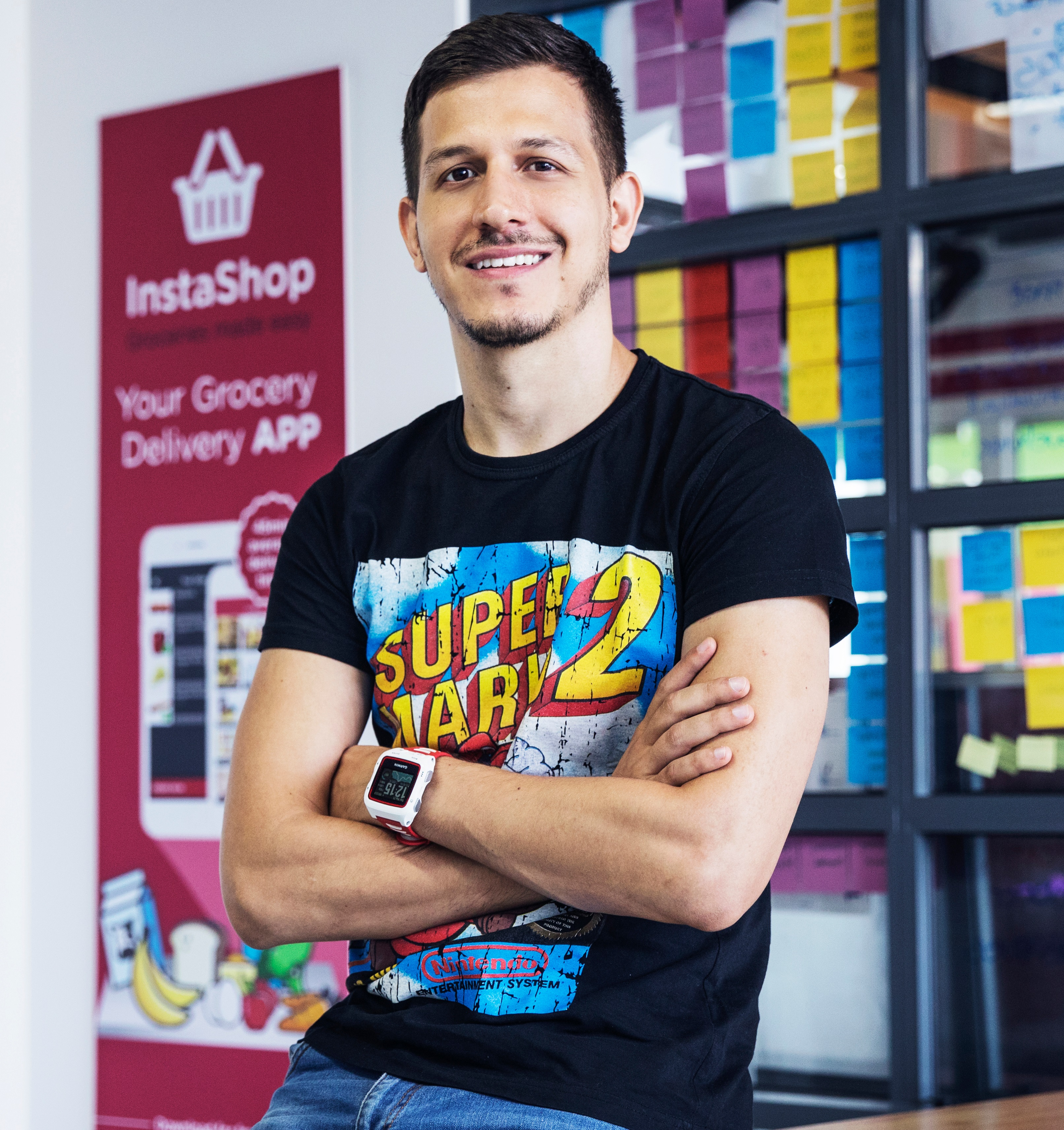
John Tsioris, founder of Instashop

instashop was founded in 2015 in Dubai by Greek entrepreneurs John Tsioris and Ioanna Angelidaki. The idea for the company emerged when Tsioris became frustrated with the traditional phone-based process of ordering groceries, which he found inefficient and time-consuming. To address this, he partnered with Angelidaki to develop a mobile-first service that streamlines on-demand grocery shopping. Together, they assembled a team and built an early version of the app that they launched in the UAE market. The company is currently led by its CEO, Nikola Cabarkapa.

The company's app-based service allows users to order a wide range of daily essentials from supermarkets and local neighborhood retailers, offering both instant and scheduled delivery options.

Since its inception, instashop has expanded its network to include various local retailers across different shopping categories, such as pharmacies, butcheries, fresh produce markets, pet shops, flower shops, restaurants, bakeries, beauty shops, organic stores, electronics outlets and more.

Beyond its Business-to-customer (B2C) service, instashop also operates as a business-to-business (B2B) service, generating revenue through commissions paid by the shops it delivers from.

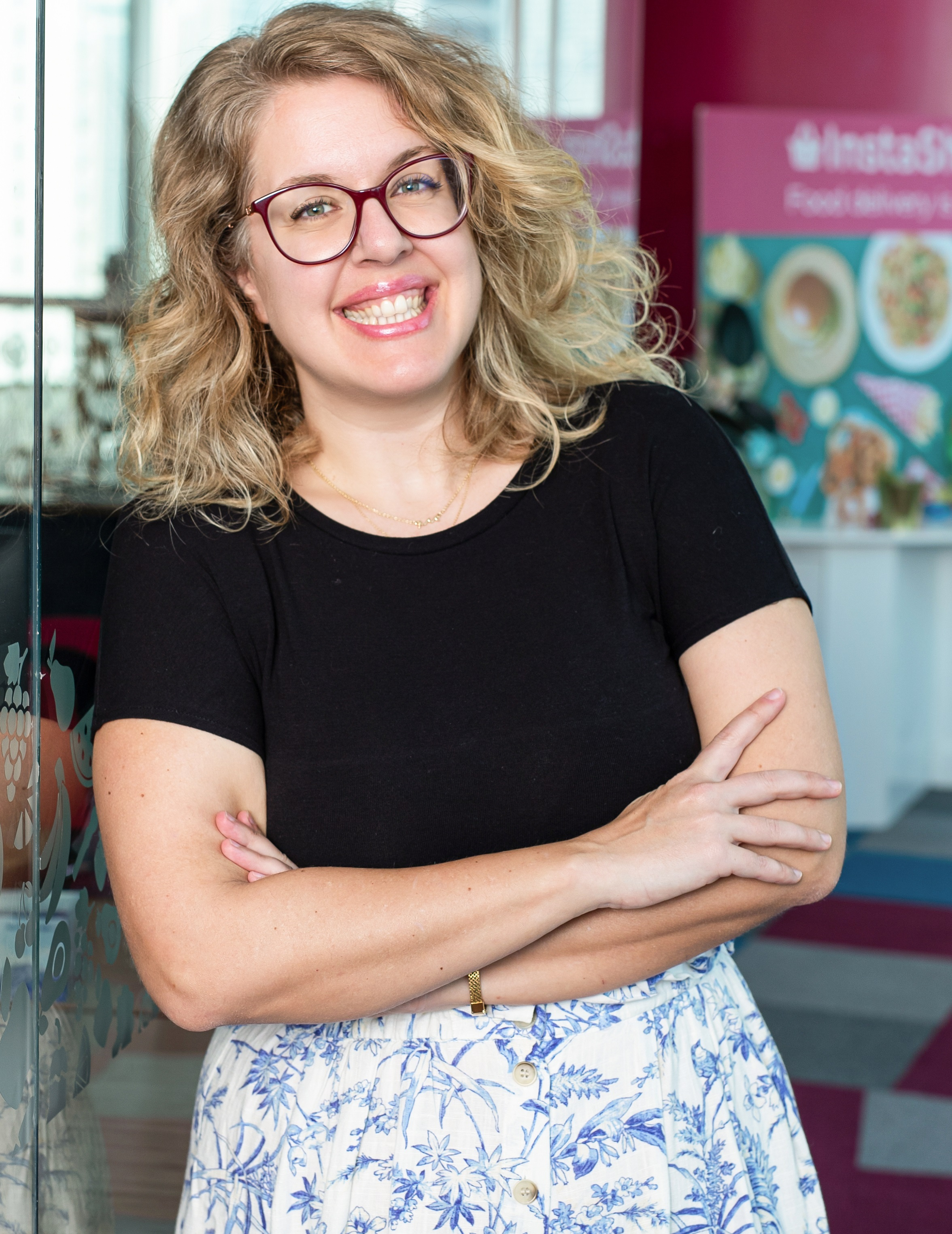
Ioanna Angelidaki, founder of Instashop

Instashop partners with approximately 1,500 vendors and operates in the United Arab Emirates, Qatar, Bahrain, Egypt, and Lebanon.

== History ==
In the second half of 2015, Instashop secured its first external financing—approximately US$365,000 in seed funding—from Dubai's Jabbar Internet Group and Greece-based VentureFriends, with a follow-on round in 2016 bringing total seed-stage investment to around US$750,000. In October 2016, Souq.com acquired a significant minority stake in the company, enabling Instashop to expand beyond the UAE into Qatar, Bahrain, Egypt and Lebanon by 2018. Souq.com itself was later acquired by Amazon.com in 2017, indirectly linking Amazon to InstaShop's investor base.

In October 2016, Souq.сom, one of the Gulf region e-commerce major companies, invested in instashop. On August 26, 2020, instashop announced its acquisition by Berlin-based Delivery Hero in a deal reportedly worth $360 million. At the time of the acquisition, InstaShop had reportedly reached a gross merchandise value (GMV) of US$360 million. instashop has continued to operate as an independent brand with no changes in its management.

On November 17, 2023, founder John Tsioris stepped down as CEO and was succeeded by Nikola Cabarkapa.

In 2024, InstaShop generated a gross merchandise value (GMV) of US$631 million, representing a 16 percent year-over-year increase, which accounted for roughly 8 percent of Talabat's overall 2024 GMV.

On February 25, 2025, food delivery platform Talabat Holding fully acquired instashop from Delivery Hero in a deal valued at $32 million, according to a regulatory filing. The price is largely symbolic, as the agreement is part of an internal restructuring within Delivery Hero. instashop continues to operate as an independent brand within Talabat's Grocery and Retail vertical.
