= Julia Kotlarsky =

New Zealand academic

- Education: Erasmus University Rotterdam
- Scientific career
- Fields: Information systems, outsourcing
- Thesis: Management of globally distributed component-based software development projects (2005)

Julia Kotlarsky is a New Zealand academic, and as of 2018 is a full professor at the University of Auckland.

== Academic career ==
After her 2005 PhD thesis titled 'Management of globally distributed component-based software development projects' at the Erasmus University Rotterdam, Kotlarsky moved to the University of Warwick, and then in 2012 joined Aston University as a full professor. In 2018 she moved to University of Auckland.

Much of Kotlarsky's research relates to outsourcing and offshoring. Together with Leslie Willcocks and Ilan Oshri, Kotlarsky is the author of The Handbook of Global Outsourcing and Offshoring, which argues that companies tend to consider offshoring in situations where their profits are already diminishing. Her current research revolves around digital sustainability; the interface between artificial intelligence technologies and humans; data and digital transformation; and technology sourcing.

== Selected works ==
- Kotlarsky, Julia; Oshri, Ilan (2005). "Social ties, knowledge sharing and successful collaboration in globally distributed system development projects". European Journal of Information Systems. 14 (1): 37–48.
- Oshri, Ilan; Kotlarsky, Julia; Willcocks, Leslie P. (2015). The Handbook of Global Outsourcing and Offshoring (3rd ed.). Palgrave Macmillan. ISBN 978-1-137-43744-0.
- Oshri, Ilan; Kotlarsky, Julia; Willcocks, Leslie P. (2007). "Managing dispersed expertise in IT offshore outsourcing: Lessons from Tata Consultancy Services". MIS Quarterly Executive. 6 (2): 53–65.
- Kotlarsky, Julia; Scarbrough, Harry; Oshri, Ilan (2014). "Coordinating expertise across knowledge boundaries in offshore-outsourcing projects: The role of codification". MIS Quarterly. 38 (2): 607–627.
