= Klaas Bom =

Dutch engineer (1937–2025)

Nicolaas "Klaas" Bom (1 December 1937 – 4 October 2025) was a Dutch engineer. He was a professor of medical technology in cardiology at the Erasmus MC. His 1970s research on ultrasound technology provided several new medical devices, including the portable ultrasound scanner.

== Career ==
Bom was born on 1 December 1937 in Velsen. He was the third of five children. He attended the Hogere Burgerschool in Velsen. He studied electrical engineering at Delft University of Technology, writing his dissertation on electromagnetic wave propagation. Through a university hockey teammate he was brought into contact with the Royal Netherlands Navy Sonarlab. He subsequently joined the Royal Netherlands Navy, became an officer, and did sonar research in La Spezia, Italy for six years. In 1968 Bom started working at the cardiology department of the Erasmus MC and engaged in diagnostic echo research. Bom continued his studies and in 1972 obtained his PhD on the topic of echocardiography. He subsequently became head of bioengineering of the Thoraxcenter.

== Research ==
In the 1970s Bom worked on diagnostic ultrasound research. By 1971 he had created a machine that was able to produce a full-view cross-section of a working heart. He also created both the first phased array catheter and the first linear array. Together with the company Organon Teknika his department was also responsible for the development of a portable ultrasound machine in 1976, the Minivisor, which did not become a commercial success. Overall his research group was involved in the areas of echo contrast, intravascular echo catheters and diagnostic ultrasounds in general. During this time Bom also constructed five machines that would be able to display two-dimensional echo's and subsequently distributed these machines around hospitals worldwide.

Bom also served for ten years as (co)-director of the Interuniversity Cardiology Institute of the Netherlands (ICIN-KNAW), the predecessor to the Netherlands Heart Institute. He retired in 2003.

Bom was elected a member of the Royal Netherlands Academy of Arts and Sciences in 1993. In 2001 Bom was made a Knight in the Order of the Netherlands Lion. He was an honorary member of the Dutch Society for Medical Ultrasound and EFSUMB.

== Personal life ==
From his first marriage Bom had two children. In 1994 he married once again. He lived for over forty years in Berkenwoude and was active in the social life of the village. As chair of the cultural center De Zwaan between 1991 and 1999 he managed to keep the institute and make it flourish.

In his later years Bom suffered from dementia. He died on 4 October 2025 in Bergambacht, two days after a fall, at the age of 87.
