= John Tsioris =

Greek entrepreneur

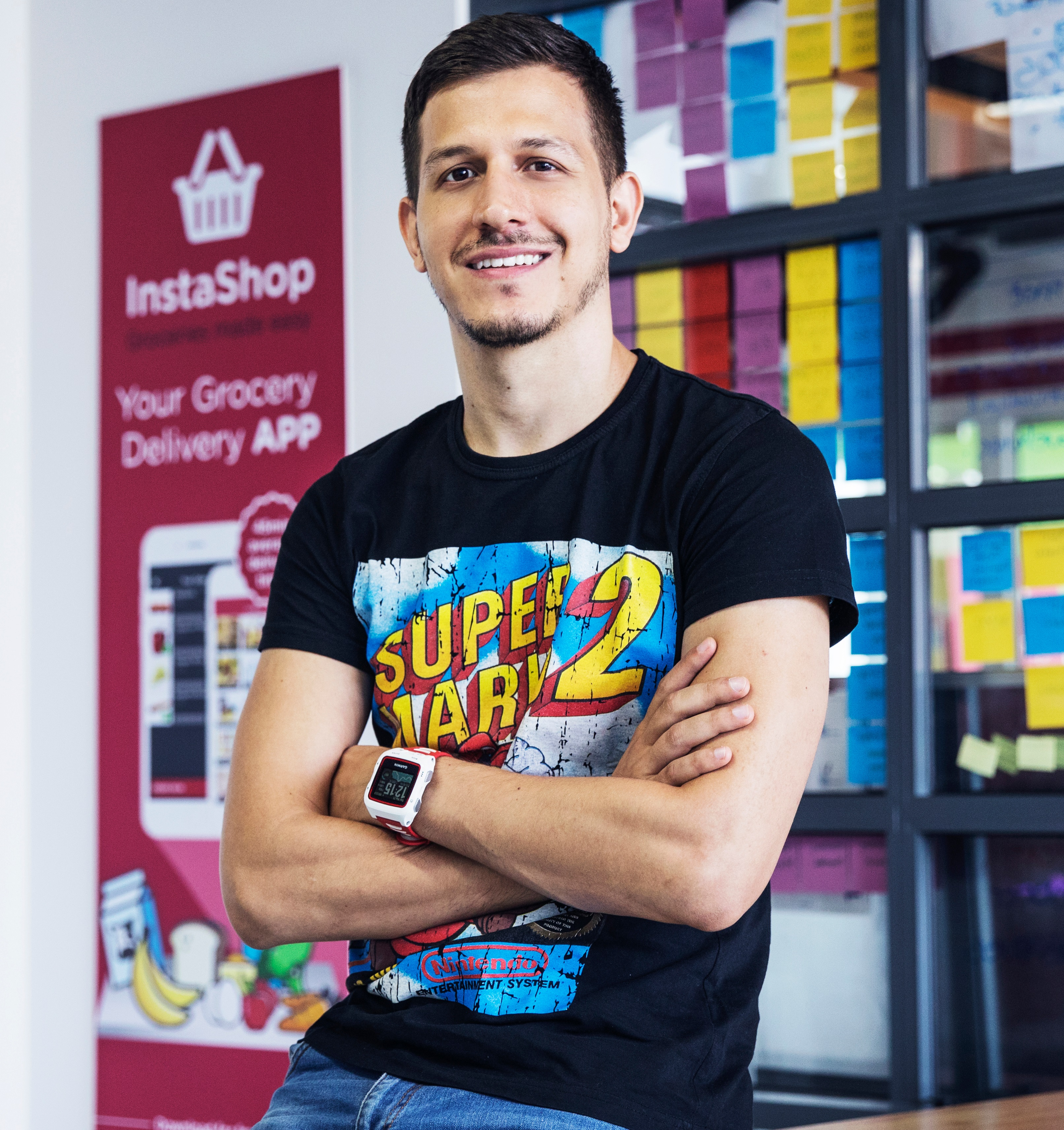
- Tsioris in 2022
- Education: Technical University of Crete, Greece
- Known for: co-founder of Instashop and Revotech

John Tsioris is a Greek entrepreneur. He is currently the founder and CEO of Revotech, and formerly the founder and CEO of InstaShop.

== Education ==
Tsioris received his education from the Technical University of Crete in Greece, where he studied production engineering and management in 2008.

In 2011, he got Master of Science in Business Administration from Rotterdam School of Management, Erasmus University.

== Career ==
After completing education, he worked on competitive intelligence of PHILIPS CL until 2013 and set up the marketing Intelligence department for the Middle East & Turkey Lighting organization.

In 2013, Tsioris moved to Dubai, where he co-founded a voice social network app called Vound with Ioanna Angelidaki. The project was closed after 17 months.

He co-founded Instashop in June 2015, serving only a part of Dubai Marina. The concept originated when Tsioris, was unsatisfied by the inefficiencies of telephone‑based grocery orders, proposed a mobile‑first solution to streamline on‑demand shopping. Together with Angelidaki, he assembled a small founding team, self‑funded the initial development, and launched the platform later that year. Using the same team behind Vound, Tsioris and Angelidaki started developing Instashop. The company raised funds from Athens-based VentureFriends and Dubai-based Jabbar Internet Group.

In 2016, his company raised an undisclosed amount of funding from Souq.com, the region's e-commerce major.

Until 2018, InstaShop has expanded from the UAE to Qatar, Egypt, Lebanon and Bahrain and was nominated one of the region’s most promising start-ups to watch by Forbes Middle East.

As of the second quarter of 2020, his company has generated $300 million in gross merchandise value, with 500,000 active users in five countries across the Middle East.

His company was acquired by German food ordering and delivery company Delivery Hero in 2020 for $360 million. InstaShop continues to work as an independent platform led by him and Angelidaki.

After InstaShop's acquisition, John Tsioris founded Revotech, a technology company with a primary focus on the healthcare industry.

In June 2021, Tsioris met with Prime Minister Kyriakos Mitsotakis to discuss the future of innovation and the technology ecosystem in Greece.

In November 2023, he stepped down as CEO of InstaShop.

In June 2024, John Tsioris joined the ANT1 TV show Dragon’s Den Greece 3 as one of the investors, showcasing his role in supporting innovative Greek startups.
