= Alice Chiang =

American electrical engineer

Alice M. Chiang is a Taiwanese-American electrical engineer known for her work in ultrasound. She is the founder, president, and CEO of Terason, an ultrasound imaging company.

== Education and career ==
Chiang was an undergraduate physics student at National Taiwan University, where she received her bachelor's degree. She continued her studies at Virginia Tech, completing her Ph.D. there.

After working at the Honeywell Radiation Center from 1973 to 1976, she joined the MIT Lincoln Laboratory in 1976. At the Lincoln Laboratory, she originally worked in the Microelectronics Group and in 1992 moved to the Analog Device Technology Group. Her work there involved image processing to enable the use of high-speed charge-coupled device imaging.

Chiang founded Terason in 1994 as a spin-off from the Lincoln Laboratory, initially focusing on military applications of ultrasound imaging. Under her leadership, the company later developed products for medical applications of miniaturized ultrasound imaging, including ultrasound-guided sclerotherapy.

== Recognition ==
Chian was named as an IEEE Fellow in 1997, "for contributions to signal processors using charge-coupled devices".
