= Eric Steegers =

Dutch obstetrician-gynaecologist (born 1961)

- Born: Eric Adrianus Petrus Steegers; January 13, 1961 (age 65); Voorburg, Netherlands
- Education: Catholic University of Nijmegen
- Known for: Social obstetrics, Generation R
- Scientific career
- Fields: Obstetrics, gynaecology
- Workplaces: Erasmus MC

Eric Adrianus Petrus Steegers (born 13 January 1961) is a Dutch obstetrician and gynaecologist. He is a professor at Erasmus MC in Rotterdam, where he has held the chair of social obstetrics since 2026. From 2015 to 2026 he headed the department of Obstetrics and Gynaecology at Erasmus MC.

Much of his research concerns the earliest weeks of pregnancy: how the embryo and placenta take shape, and what a disturbed start there means later for both mother and child. A good deal of it runs through birth cohorts, among them the Generation R study. He is best known for the revival of social obstetrics in the Netherlands — an approach that places medical care around pregnancy next to the social conditions in which expectant parents live. Out of it grew several programmes, at first in Rotterdam and later across the country: Klaar voor een Kind, Moeders van Rotterdam and Kansrijke Start (Solid Start).

== Education and career ==
Steegers studied medicine at the Catholic University of Nijmegen, where he obtained his doctorate with a thesis titled Salt and pregnancy. From 1996 he worked as a perinatologist and staff member at the university hospital in Nijmegen, becoming a senior lecturer in 2000.

In 2001 he moved to Erasmus MC in Rotterdam, where he became head of the subdepartment of Obstetrics and Prenatal Diagnostics. He was appointed full professor of obstetrics and prenatal medicine in 2004 and delivered his inaugural lecture on 11 March 2005. From October 2015 to 2026 he headed the department of Obstetrics and Gynaecology.

On 1 July 2026 Steegers took up the chair of social obstetrics, stepping down as department head to concentrate on that theme in the years before his retirement. His inaugural lecture for the chair is scheduled for 8 January 2027.

== Research ==
His central question is why the growth of the embryo and placenta falters in the first weeks after conception, and how that early disturbance carries forward into a child's health. Those answers come largely from long-term cohorts. Steegers is a member of the management team of the Generation R study, the Rotterdam cohort that has followed thousands of children from pregnancy onward since 2002, and he co-initiated the Rotterdam Predict study into early embryonic and placental development.

== Social obstetrics ==
The term social obstetrics dates back to the 1970s. From 2006 Steegers mapped perinatal mortality in Rotterdam at neighbourhood level, finding that babies in deprived districts faced a considerably higher risk than the city average. With colleagues he argued for renewed attention to the field.

He turned the argument into programmes. The first, Klaar voor een Kind, began in 2009 with the city of Rotterdam and centred on advice and care for people who were thinking about having a child. In 2015 Moeders van Rotterdam followed, a collaboration between Erasmus MC, the municipal Bureau Frontlijn and the De Verre Bergen foundation in which pregnant women in vulnerable circumstances are supported by a coach. The national programme Healthy Pregnancy for All and the government action programme Kansrijke Start (Solid Start) built on this approach.

Steegers has repeatedly brought the subject to public attention, including in advocacy for preconception care, meaning care and information before a pregnancy begins. In 2004 he was involved in founding the Preconception Care Netherlands foundation. In 2010 the report Lijnen in de Perinatale Sterfte, which he prepared with Gouke Bonsel and others, addressed the comparatively high infant mortality in the Netherlands and how it might be reduced.

== Publications ==
Steegers has published extensively on perinatal health and has been section editor for gynaecology of the Nederlands Tijdschrift voor Geneeskunde since 2017. He has also written and edited several books, including works for a general readership. A selection:

- Gezond zwanger worden (with Anjo Geluk). Atlas Contact, 2012; revised edition with Anjo Geluk, Annemarie Mulders and Yves Jacquemyn, Garant, 2023.
- Textbook of Obstetrics and Gynaecology: a life course approach (editor-in-chief). Bohn Stafleu van Loghum, 2019; 2nd edition 2024.
- Preconception Health and Care: A Life Course Approach (with Jill Shawe and Sarah Verbiest). Springer, 2020.
- Sociale verloskunde (with Adja Waelput and Piet-Hein Peeters). Bohn Stafleu van Loghum, 2021.
