= Tim Hortons =

Canadian multinational coffeehouse and restaurant chain

Tim Hortons Inc.

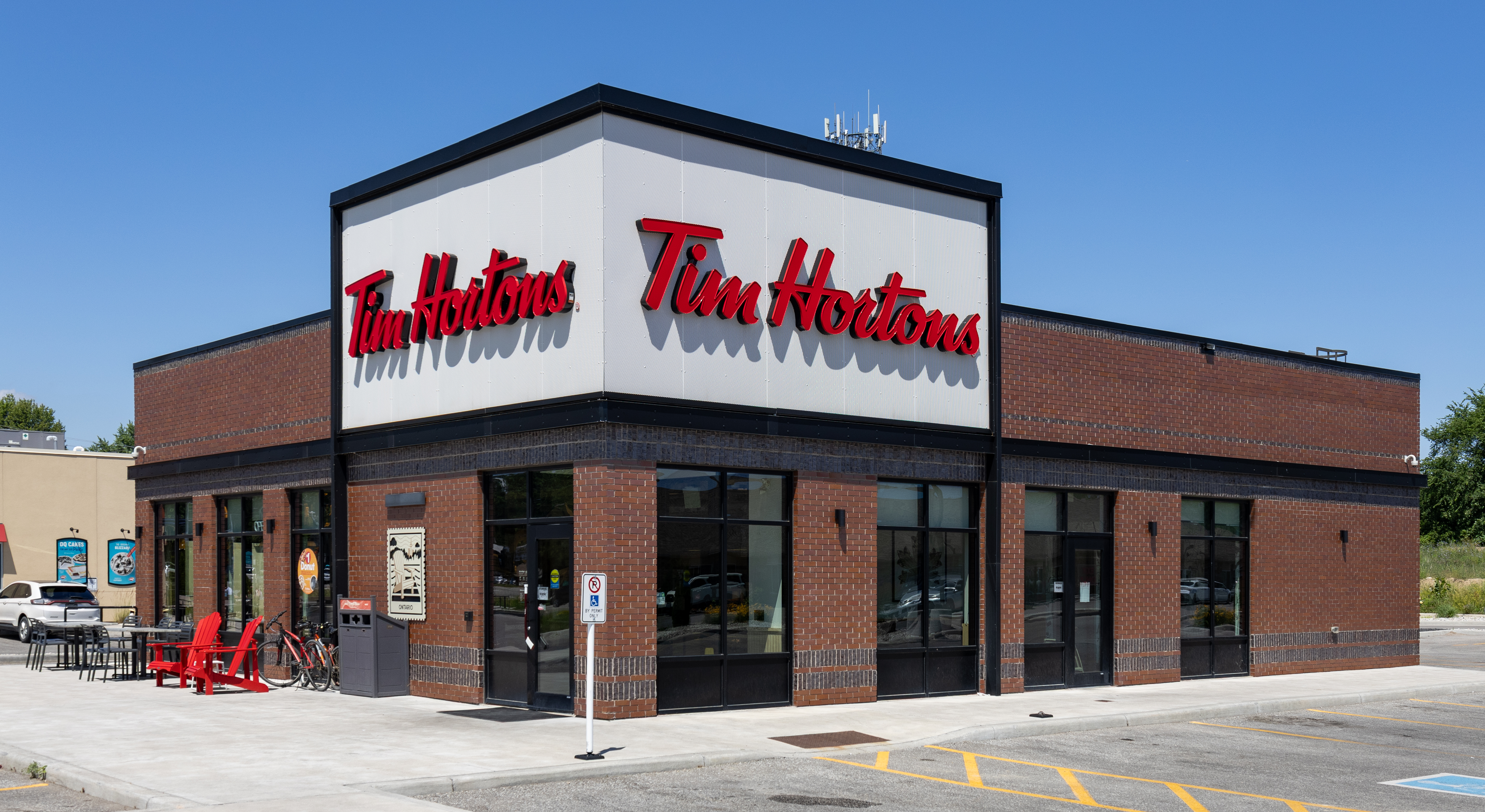
- Tim Hortons in Kingsville, Ontario
- Formerly: Tim Horton Donuts; Tim Donuts Limited; The TDL Group
- Type: Subsidiary
- Industry: Quick-service restaurant
- Founded: May 17, 1964; 62 years ago
- Founders: Tim Horton; Jim Charade
- Headquarters: 130 King Street West, Toronto, Ontario, Canada
- Number of locations: 6,000+
- Areas served: List: Andorra; Bahrain; Canada; China; India; Indonesia; Kuwait; Malaysia; Mexico; Oman; Pakistan; Panama; Philippines; Qatar; Saudi Arabia; Singapore; South Korea; Spain; Thailand; United Arab Emirates; United Kingdom; United States
- Key people: J. Patrick Doyle (Executive Chairman, RBI); Joshua Kobza (CEO, RBI); Axel Schwan (president)
- Products: List: Coffee; Iced coffee; Soft drinks; Cream sodas; Lemonade; Iced tea; Donuts; Flatbread pizza; Bagels; Grilled melts; Sandwiches; Soup; Chilli; Wraps; Breakfast egg muffins; Timbits
- Net income: ▲ Can$2.019 billion
- Total assets: ▲ Can$35.810 billion
- Parent: Restaurant Brands International (2014–present)
- Website: timhortons.ca

Tim Hortons Inc., known colloquially as Tim's, Timmies or Timmy's, is a Canadian multinational coffeehouse and restaurant chain with headquarters in Toronto, serving coffee, donuts, sandwiches, breakfast egg muffins and other fast-food items. It is Canada's largest quick-service restaurant chain, with 6,043 restaurants across 14 countries.

The company was founded in 1964 in Hamilton, Ontario, by Canadian ice hockey player Tim Horton (1930–1974) and Jim Charade (1934–2009), after an initial venture in hamburger restaurants. In 1967, Horton partnered with investor Ron Joyce, who assumed control over operations after Horton died in 1974. Joyce expanded the chain into a multi-billion dollar franchise. Charade left the organization in 1966 and briefly returned in 1970 and 1993 through 1996. The Wendy's Company merged with Tim Hortons in 1995 and operated it under their flagship subsidiary until 2006.

On August 26, 2014, Burger King agreed to merge with Tim Hortons for US$11.4 billion. The two chains became subsidiaries of Toronto-based holding company Restaurant Brands International on December 15, 2014.

== History ==
=== 1964–1989: Tim Horton and Ron Joyce ===
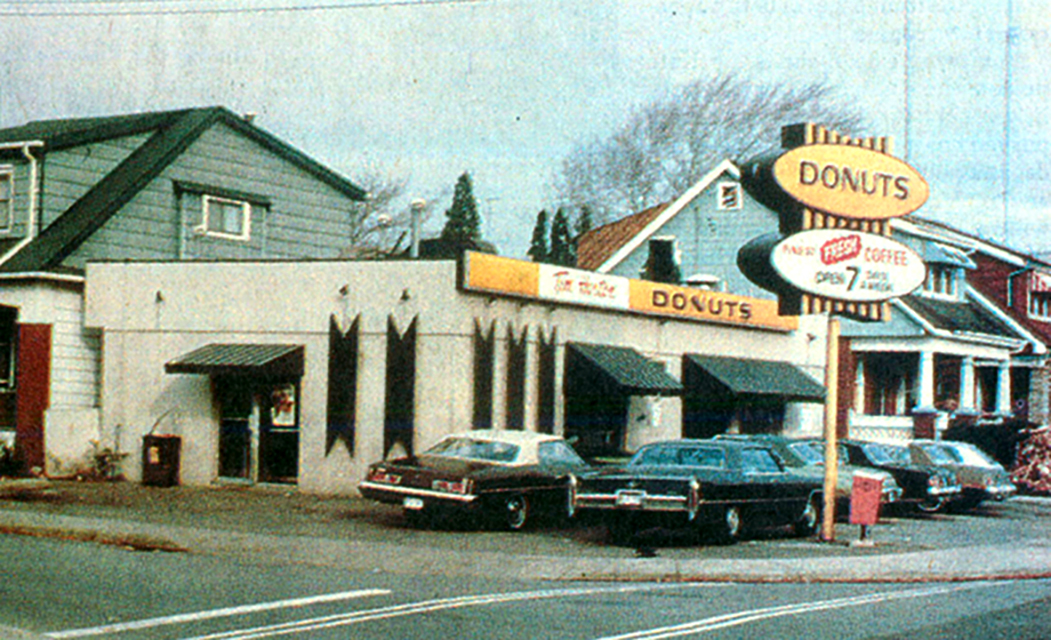
The first Tim Hortons outlet around late 1970s-early 1980s in Hamilton, Ontario, at Ottawa St. N. and Dunsmure Road (renovated in 2014, see below)

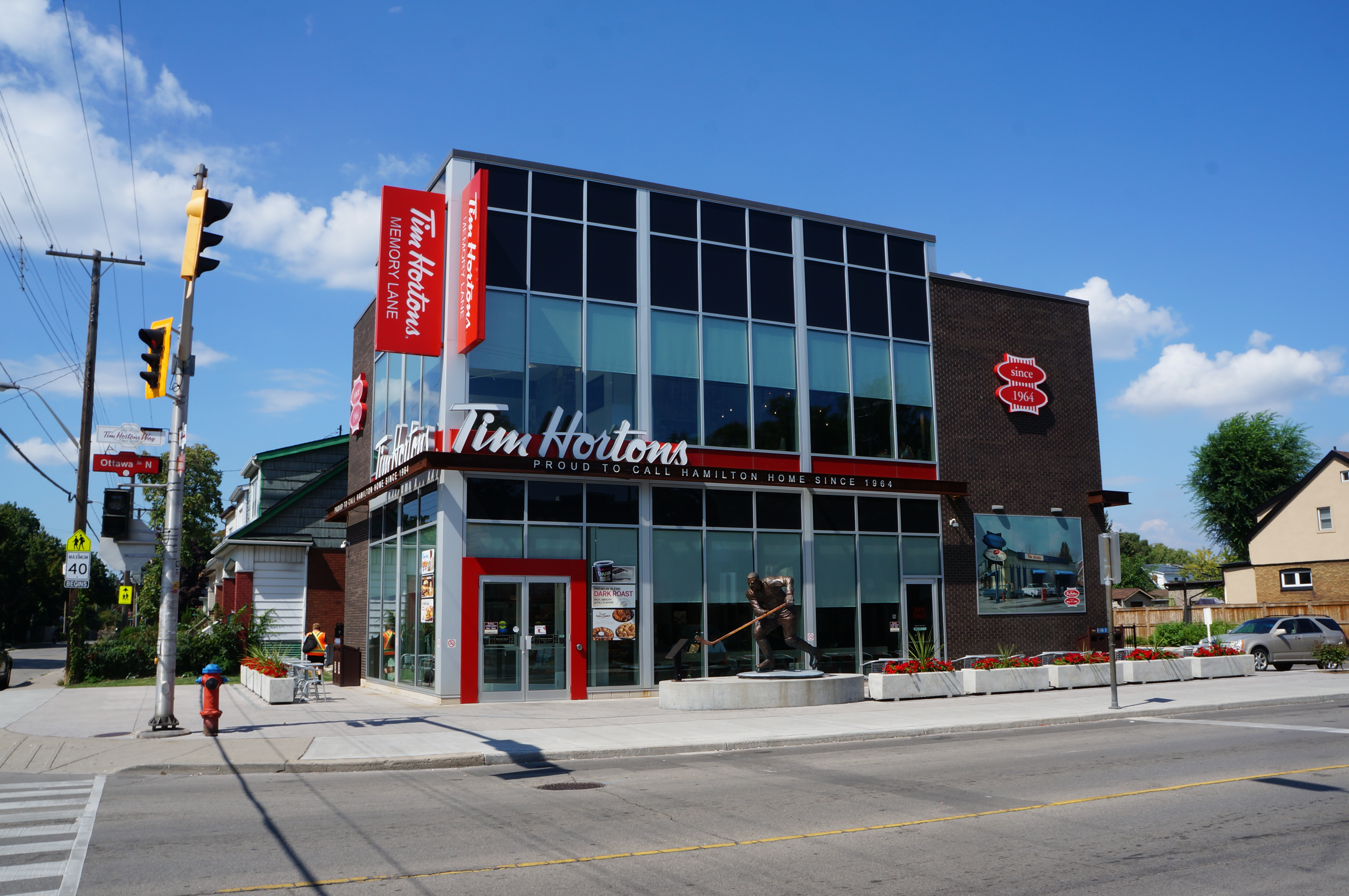
The first Tim Hortons outlet (same as above) as seen in 2016 after renovation

The business was founded by Tim Horton, who played in the National Hockey League from 1949 until his death in an auto crash in 1974. The first Tim Horton restaurant was in North Bay, Ontario, and sold hamburgers. The chain's first donut store opened on May 17, 1964, in Hamilton, Ontario, under the name Tim Horton Donuts. The name was later abbreviated to "Tim Horton's" and then changed to "Tim Hortons" without the possessive apostrophe.

Soon after Horton opened the store, he met Ron Joyce, a former police constable in Hamilton. In 1965, Joyce took over the fledgling Tim Horton Donut Shop at 65 Ottawa Street North. By 1967, after opening two additional stores, the two became full partners. Upon Horton's death in 1974, Joyce bought out the Horton family's shares for $1 million and took over as sole owner of the existing chain of 40 stores, quickly and aggressively expanding the chain in both geography and product selection. The 500th store opened in 1991.

Joyce's aggressive expansion of the business resulted in major changes to the Canadian coffee and donut restaurant market. Many independent donut shops and small chains were driven out of business, while Canada's per-capita ratio of donut shops surpassed that of all other countries.

The Horton and Joyce partnership carried on, with the marriage of Joyce's son, Ron Joyce Jr., and Horton's eldest daughter, Jeri-Lynn Horton-Joyce, who were joint owners of Tim Hortons franchises in Cobourg, Ontario, until 2023 when the couple retired after 37 years.

=== 1990–2002: Name change and growth ===
Tim Hortons logo as used in the mid-1990s

The company had originally been incorporated as Tim Donut Limited. By the 1990s, the company name had changed to The TDL Group Ltd. This was an effort by the company to diversify the business, removing the primary emphasis on donuts, and continuing the expansion of the menu options as consumer tastes broadened.

Some older locations retain signage with the company's name, including a possessive apostrophe, despite the fact that the official styling of the company's name has been Tim Hortons without an apostrophe for at least a decade. The company had removed the apostrophe after signs using the apostrophe was interpreted by some to be breaking the language sign laws of the province of Quebec in 1993. The removal of the apostrophe allowed the company to have one common sign image across Canada.

Although a number of Quebec locations have bilingual menu boards, the decision to have both Canadian official languages represented is left to the discretion of individual franchise owners. Some Quebec locations have French-only menu boards. It is the strong recommendation to all the Quebec restaurants from the TDL Group Corporation that they post menu boards in both English and French in accordance with the standards being enforced by the Office québécois de la langue française.

==== Merger with Wendy's ====
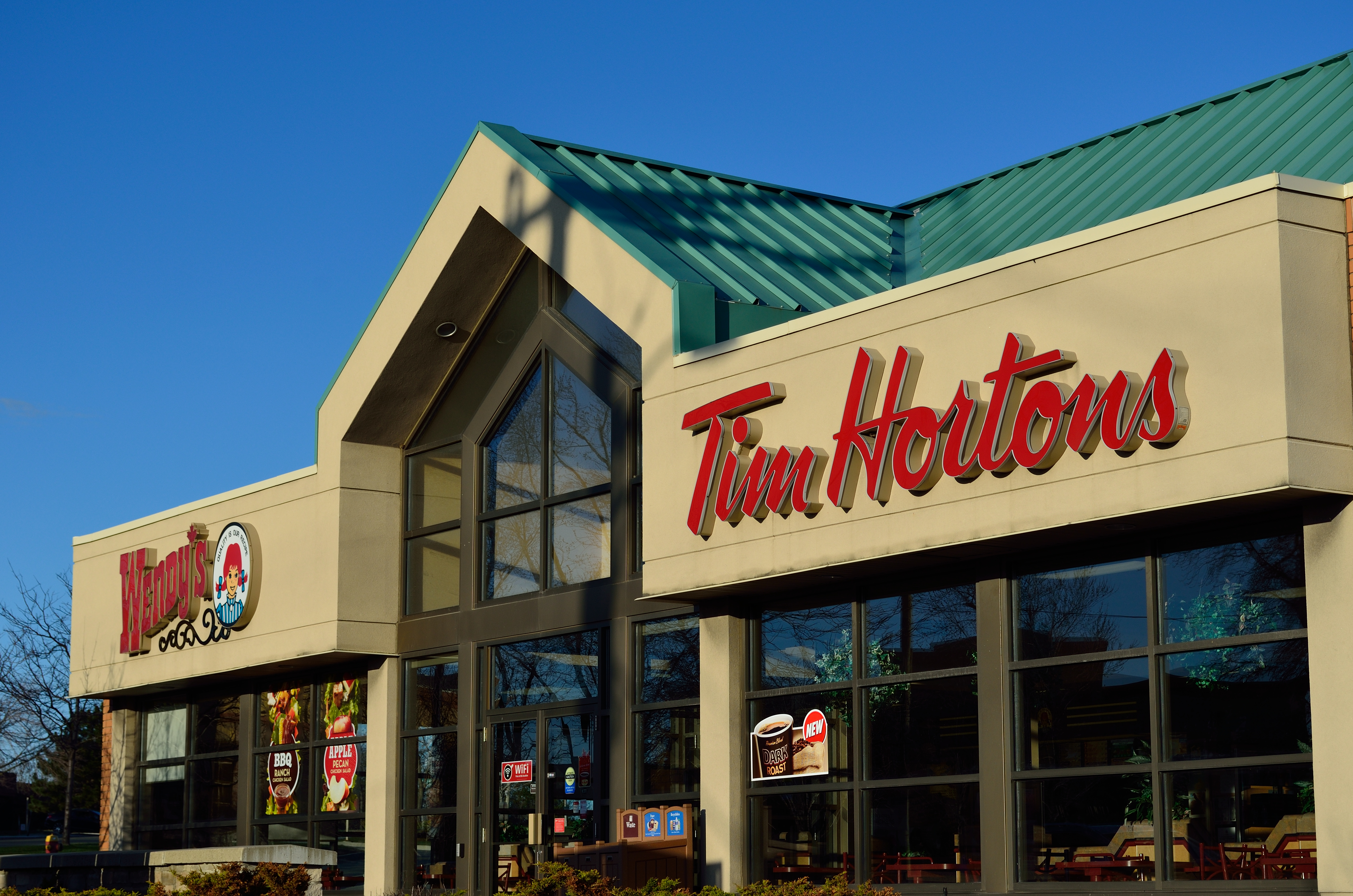
A Tim Hortons/Wendy's joint restaurant in Markham, Ontario

In 1992, the owner of all Tim Hortons and Wendy's restaurants in Prince Edward Island, Daniel P. Murphy, decided to open new franchise outlets for both brands in the same building in the town of Montague. Murphy invited Joyce and Wendy's chairman Dave Thomas to the grand opening of the "combo store," where the two executives met for the first time. Murphy's success with combining coffee and donuts with Wendy's fast food led to the August 8, 1995, acquisition of and merger with TDL Group by Wendy's International, Inc., an American company; this lasted until 2009.

The sale was widely commented on in the media. In 1995, the Toronto Star had a column reflecting on Tim Hortons "selling out" to Wendy's with "the spectacle of another great Canadian icon...gone to Yankee burgerfat".

=== 2002–2006: Regaining independence ===
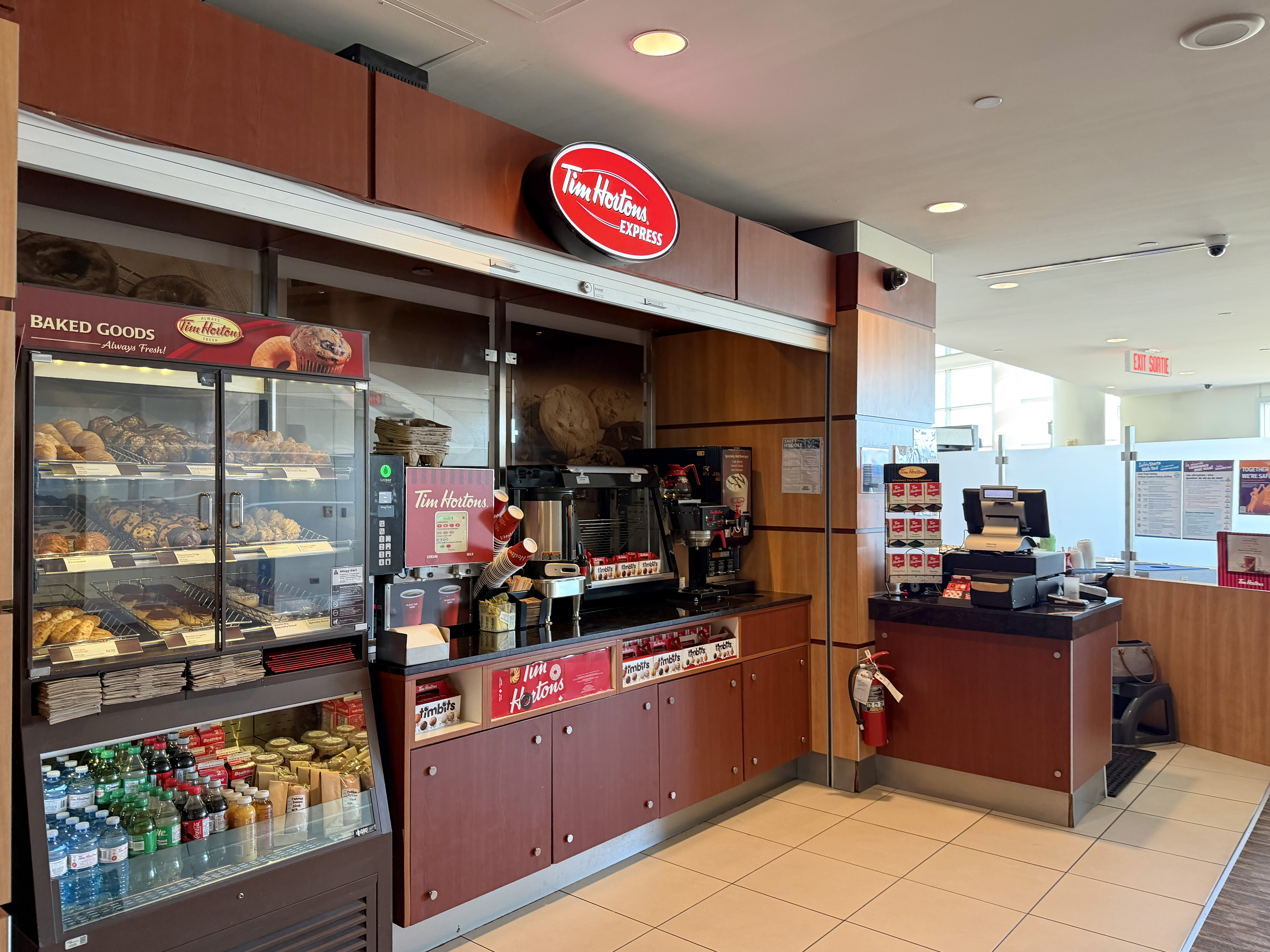
A Tim Hortons Express kiosk at Winnipeg International Airport

Tim Hortons franchises spread rapidly and eventually overtook McDonald's as Canada's largest food service operator. The company opened twice as many Canadian outlets as McDonald's by 2005, and system-wide sales also surpassed those of McDonald's Canadian operations as of 2002. The chain accounted for 22.6% of all fast-food industry revenues in Canada in 2005.

Under pressure from major investors Peter May and Nelson Peltz, in late 2005, Wendy's announced it would sell between 15% and 18% of the Tim Hortons operations in an initial public offering, which was completed on March 24, 2006, and subsequently said it would spin-off to shareholders its remaining interest by the end of 2006. Wendy's cited increased competition between the two chains and Tim Hortons' increasing self-sufficiency as reasons for its decision, but the company had been under shareholder pressure to make such a move because of the strength and profitability of the Tim Hortons brand.

Shares of the company began trading on March 24, 2006, with an initial public offering of CA$27 per share, raising over $700 million in the first day of trading. On September 24, Wendy's spun off the rest of its shares in Tim Hortons by distributing the remaining 82% to its shareholders. On the same day, Tim Hortons was added to Canada's benchmark stock-market indicator, the S&P/TSX Composite Index, and to the S&P/TSX 60.

As of March 2006, Tim Hortons commanded 76% of the Canadian market for baked goods (based on the number of customers served) and held 62% of the Canadian coffee market (compared to Starbucks, in the number two position, at 7%).

During this period Tim Hortons also introduced the Tim Hortons Express format, a compact kiosk model offering beverages and a limited baked-goods menu. These outlets were installed in non-traditional venues such as universities, airports, and military facilities.

=== 2007–2013: Repatriation ===
On June 29, 2009, Tim Hortons Inc. announced that, pending shareholder approval, the chain's operations would be reorganized under a new publicly traded company, also named "Tim Hortons Incorporated", incorporated under the Canada Business Corporations Act. The change was being made primarily for tax purposes. On September 28, 2009, Tim Hortons Inc. announced it had completed the reorganization of its corporate structure to become a Canadian public company.

In November 2010, Tim Hortons extended Interac debit payment system acceptance to most of its stores. The company previously began accepting Interac in its stores in Western Canada in 2003 and, later, MasterCard and MasterCard PayPass across most of its stores in 2007. The company often indicated the delay of broader or wider electronic payment acceptance was to "ensure speed of service." In 2012, Tim Hortons began accepting Visa cards, and in 2013, began accepting American Express cards.

In late 2013, Tim Hortons had "4,350 cafes across the world, out of which 3,500 are in Canada, 817 in the U.S. and 33 in the GCC. The Toronto Stock Exchange listed company recorded revenues of $794 million and net profit of $111 million in the September quarter."

=== 2014: Merger with Burger King ===
On August 24, 2014, American fast-food chain Burger King announced that it was in negotiations to merge with Tim Hortons Inc.; the proposed $18 billion mergers would involve a tax inversion into Canada, with a new holding company majority-owned by 3G Capital, and the remaining shares in the company held by current Burger King and Tim Hortons shareholders. A Tim Hortons representative stated that the proposed merger would allow Tim Hortons to leverage Burger King's resources for international growth; the two chains would retain separate operations post-merger. News of the proposal caused Tim Hortons' shares to increase in value by 28 percent.

On August 25, 2014, Burger King officially confirmed its intent to acquire Tim Hortons Inc. in a deal totaling CA$12.5 billion (US$11.4 billion). 3G Capital offered to purchase the company at $65.50 per share, with existing shareholders receiving $65.50 in cash and 0.8025 shares in the new holding company: per-share—all-cash ($88.50) and all-shares (3.0879) options were also made available. The agreement planned to result in 3G Capital (which held a 71% majority stake in Burger King) holding a 51% majority stake in the new company, Tim Hortons' existing shareholders owning 22%, and Burger King's owning 27% with the new entity based in Oakville and listed on both the TSX and New York Stock Exchange. Per the agreement, Burger King CEO Daniel Schwartz became CEO of the company, with existing Tim Hortons CEO Marc Caira becoming vice-chairman and director; Burger King still operated out of its existing headquarters in Miami. It was announced the deal would form the third-largest fast-food restaurant company in the world. On October 28, 2014, the deal was approved by the Competition Bureau of Canada, but had yet to be approved by Industry Canada. The Bureau ruled that the deal was "unlikely to result in a substantial lessening or prevention of competition."

Former CEO Marc Caira reassured the integrity of Tim Hortons following the purchase, stating that the acquisition would "enable us to move more quickly and efficiently to bring Tim Hortons iconic Canadian brand to a new global customer base." On October 30, 2014, various media covered a Canadian Centre for Policy Alternatives study which suggested that Burger King's proposed takeover of Tim Hortons is "likely to have overwhelmingly negative consequences for Canadians." This study analyzed Burger King's private equity owner, 3G Capital, and past takeovers of Burger King, Heinz, and Anheuser-Busch, and declared that "it has a 30-year history of aggressive cost cutting, which could hurt Tim Hortons employees, small-businesspeople, Canadian taxpayers, and consumers."

The deal was approved by Minister of Industry James Moore (of the governing Conservative Party of Canada) on December 4, 2014: The two companies agreed to Moore's conditions, requiring that the Burger King and Tim Hortons chains retain separate operations and not combine locations, maintain "significant employment levels" at the Oakville headquarters, and ensure that Canadians make up at least 50% of Tim Hortons' board of directors. Tim Hortons shareholders approved the merger on December 9, 2014; the two chains merged under the new parent company Restaurant Brands International (RBI), which began trading on December 15, 2014. According to CBC News, "how the government will enforce [Moore's] conditions is unclear."

=== 2015–present ===
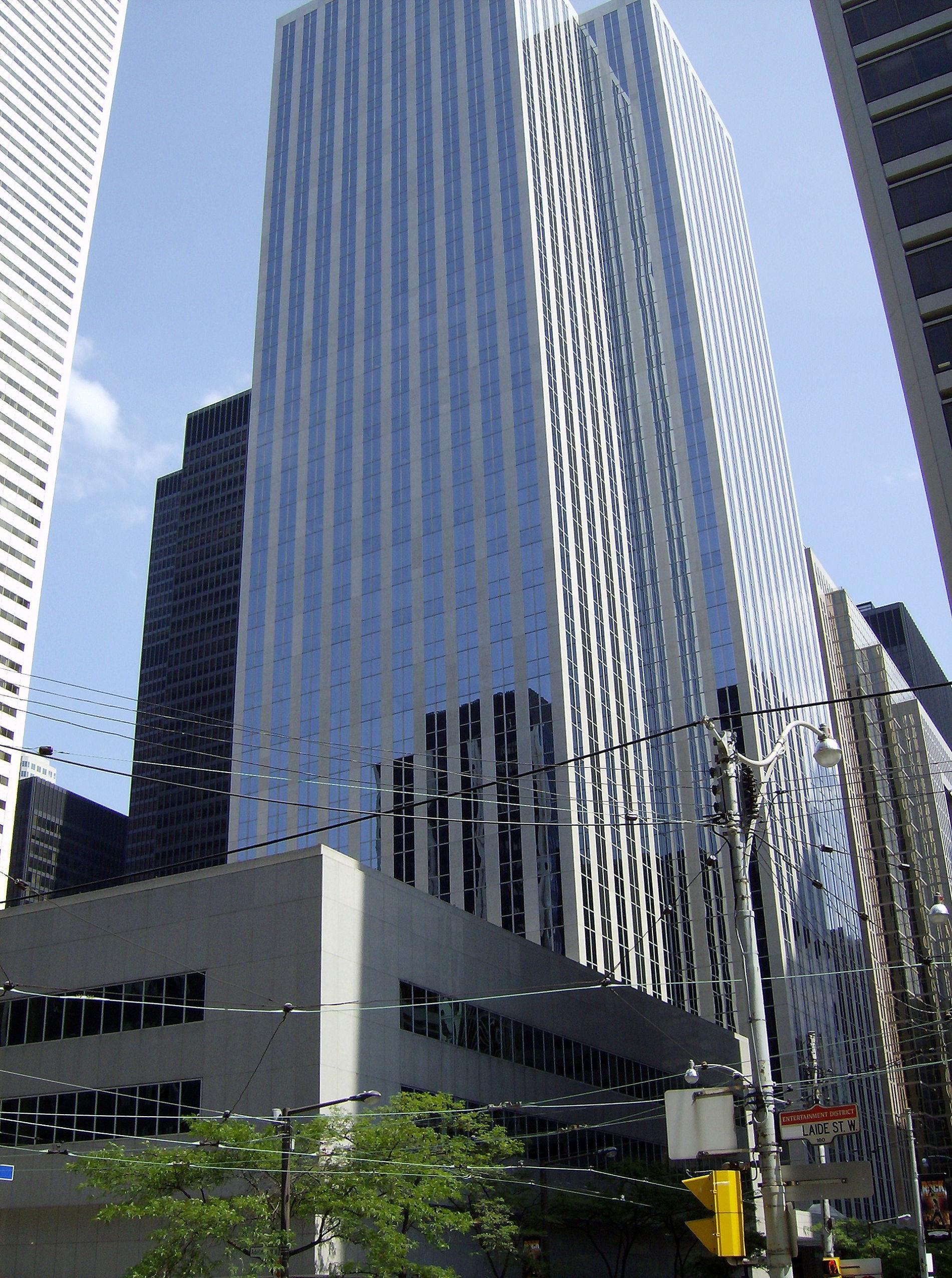
Exchange Tower houses the headquarters for Tim Hortons, and its parent company, RBI, since 2018.

In May 2015, the company announced the closure of its U.S. headquarters in Dublin, Ohio; in March 2015, it had 127 employees. In August 2016, Tim Hortons again changed presidents. In September 2016, Tim Hortons announced it would be expanding into the United Kingdom, with an unannounced number of locations to be built.

Revenue in 2015 for Restaurant Brands International was US$4.0522 billion with a rise to $4.15 billion in 2016. Tim Hortons had 683 U.S. locations by the end of 2016, and total annual revenue of US$3.00 billion.

In April 2018, Tim Hortons announced that they would be moving their head office along with its 400 employees to the Exchange Tower in downtown Toronto.

In May 2018, the Reputation Institute reported that Tim Hortons had fallen from 13th to 67th in its study of Canada's most reputable companies, as "one of the largest moves down of all 250 companies it analyzed this year'" and that the brand was "still considered to have a 'strong reputation.'"

In October 2018, Tim Hortons began to install self-serve kiosks at some locations in Ontario. In February 2019, Tim Hortons began to spread the installation of the self-serve kiosks across Canada.

== Locations ==
List of locations where Tim Hortons is available as of October 2025.

On December 31, 2018, Tim Hortons had 4,846 restaurants in 14 countries, including 3,802 in Canada, 807 in the United States, 60 in Mexico, 29 in the Middle East, and 25 in the UK. As of August 2024, Tim Hortons has 5,702 restaurants.

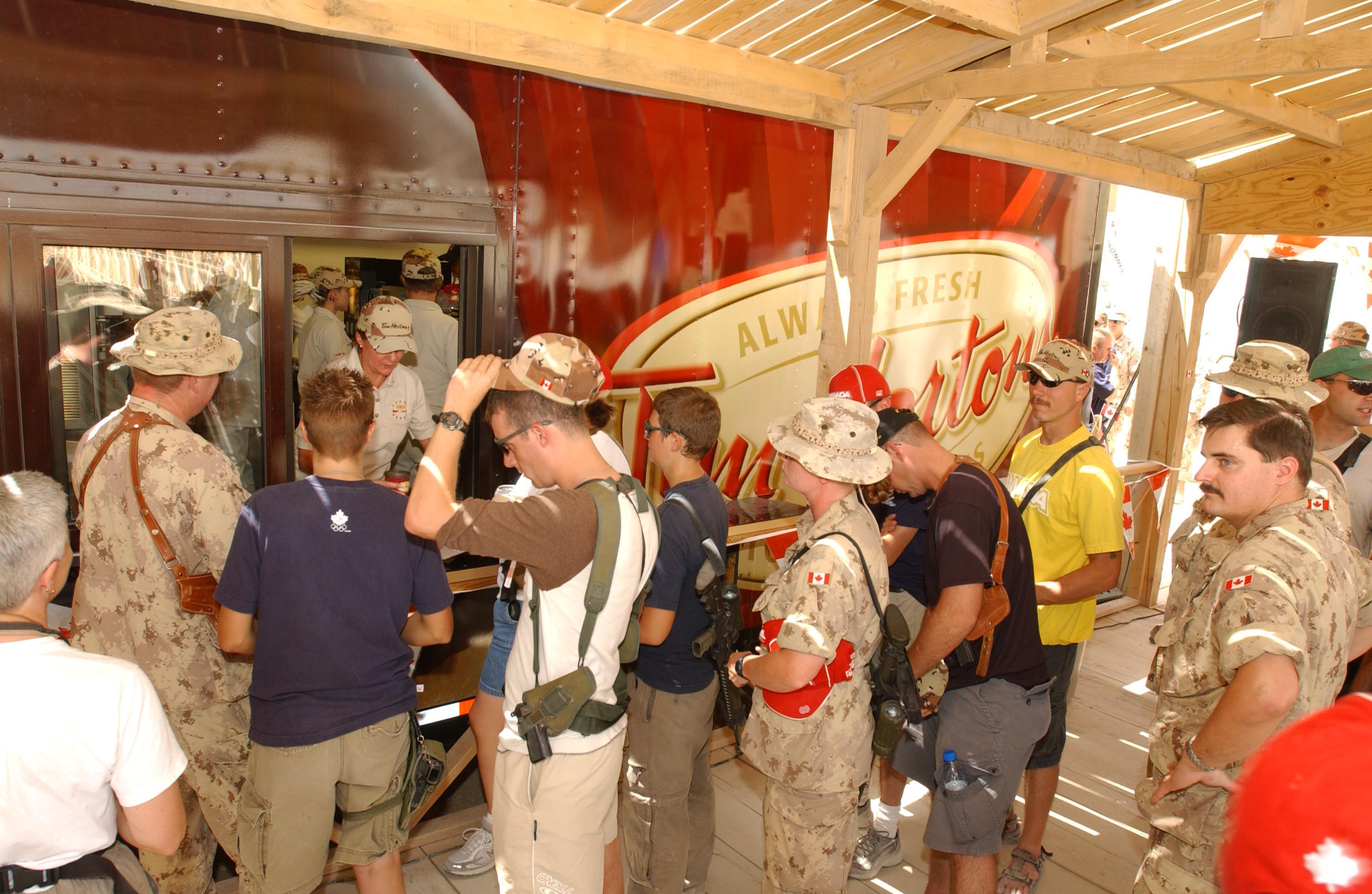
Tim Hortons in Kandahar, 2007

Tim Hortons had a presence on a number of military bases, including Kandahar in Afghanistan, although this latter outlet was principally intended for Canadian Armed Forces and allied military personnel. Three more outlets were in military bases at Aberdeen Proving Ground, Maryland, Fort Knox, Kentucky, and Naval Station Norfolk, Virginia. The latest location is at Camp Adazi in Latvia.

=== North America ===
Tim Hortons originally was concentrated in Ontario and Atlantic Canada. However, the chain has expanded its presence into Quebec and western Canada. Its location in Iqaluit, Nunavut, was the northernmost store as of 2010. Its location in Pond Inlet, Nunavut is the northernmost store as of 2023.

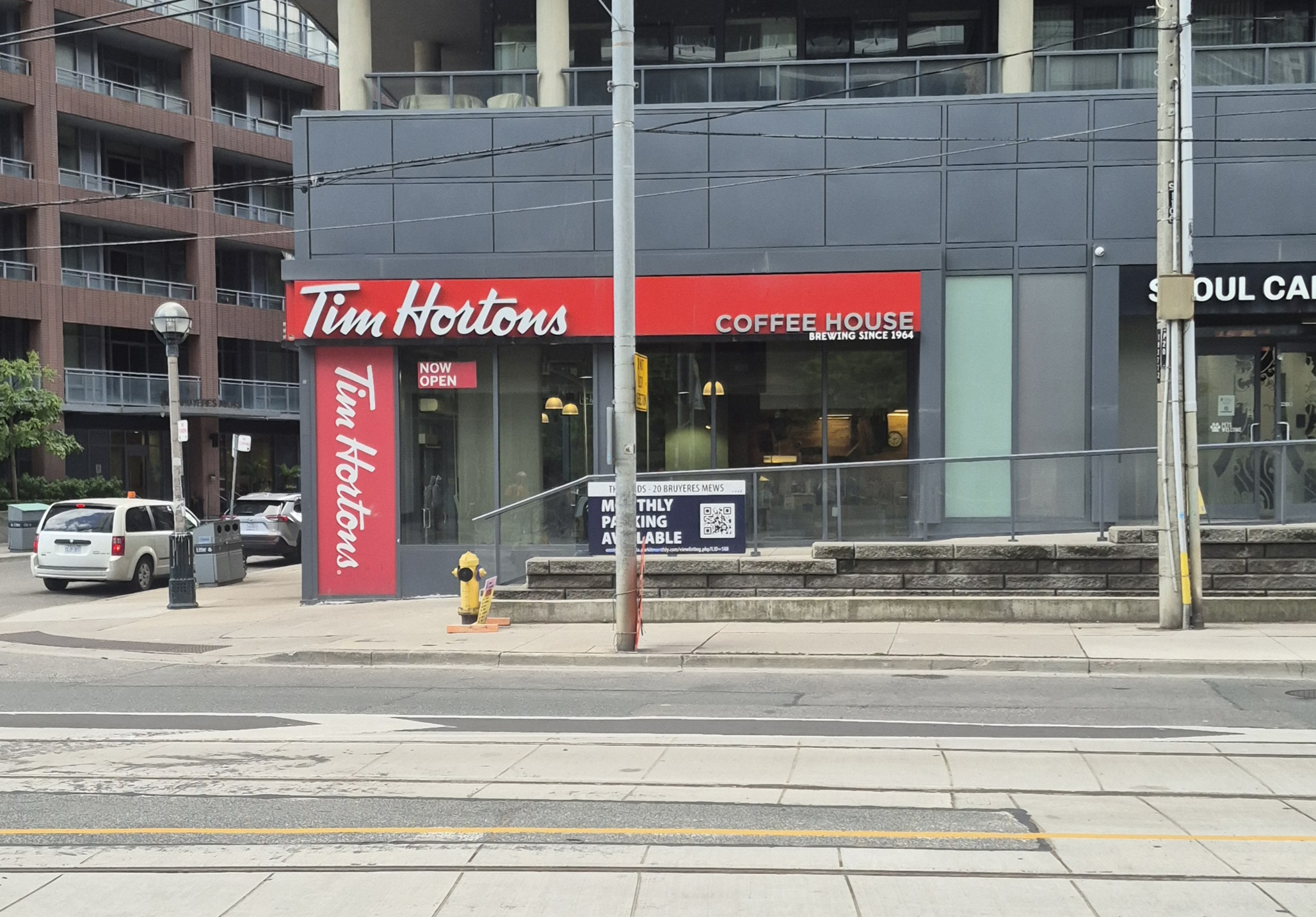
A Tim Hortons located in Toronto, Ontario

TDL Group recorded $1.48 billion in sales in 2005. Tim Hortons also operates locations on Canadian and American university campuses, including Brock University, Durham College, Georgian College, Algonquin College, Canisius College, York University, Toronto Metropolitan University, University at Buffalo, SUNY Plattsburgh, University of British Columbia, Memorial University of Newfoundland, University of Western Ontario, and Simon Fraser University.

In March 2010, Tim Hortons announced further expansion on both sides of the Canada–US border to be completed by 2013. The plan called for 600 new stores in Canada (primarily in Quebec and Western Canada but also including smaller communities) and 300 new stores in the U.S. (primarily in its existing markets of Michigan, New York, and Ohio). It also called for expansion into such non-standard store locations as hospitals, universities, and airports, as well as extending its co-branding initiative with U.S. ice cream chain Cold Stone Creamery, which began in 2009, to cover 60 Canadian stores and 25 to 35 new and existing U.S. stores. It also included testing a new café/bake shop concept in at least 10 existing U.S. locations, including "enhanced finishes, fixtures, and seating areas" as well as an expansion of menu offerings.

In 2010, Tim Hortons opened what were then its northernmost locations: three kiosks at NorthMart stores in Iqaluit, Nunavut. This expanded Tim Hortons' presence in every province and territory of Canada. According to Nick Javor, senior vice-president of corporate affairs at Tim Hortons, "You could say it's overdue. If we can be in Kandahar, why can't we be in Iqaluit?"

In December 2011, Tim Hortons opened its 4,000th restaurant. In 2012, Tim Hortons Inc. recorded its total revenues at $3.12 billion (CDN).

==== United States ====
Initially, the U.S. stores were the result of natural expansion in Canada–U.S. border areas (e.g., stores in Maine and the Buffalo, New York, area where Horton played from 1972 to 1974 as a member of the Buffalo Sabres). The first United States locations were opened in Deerfield Beach, Florida, and Pompano Beach, Florida, in 1981, but they proved unsuccessful and were closed.

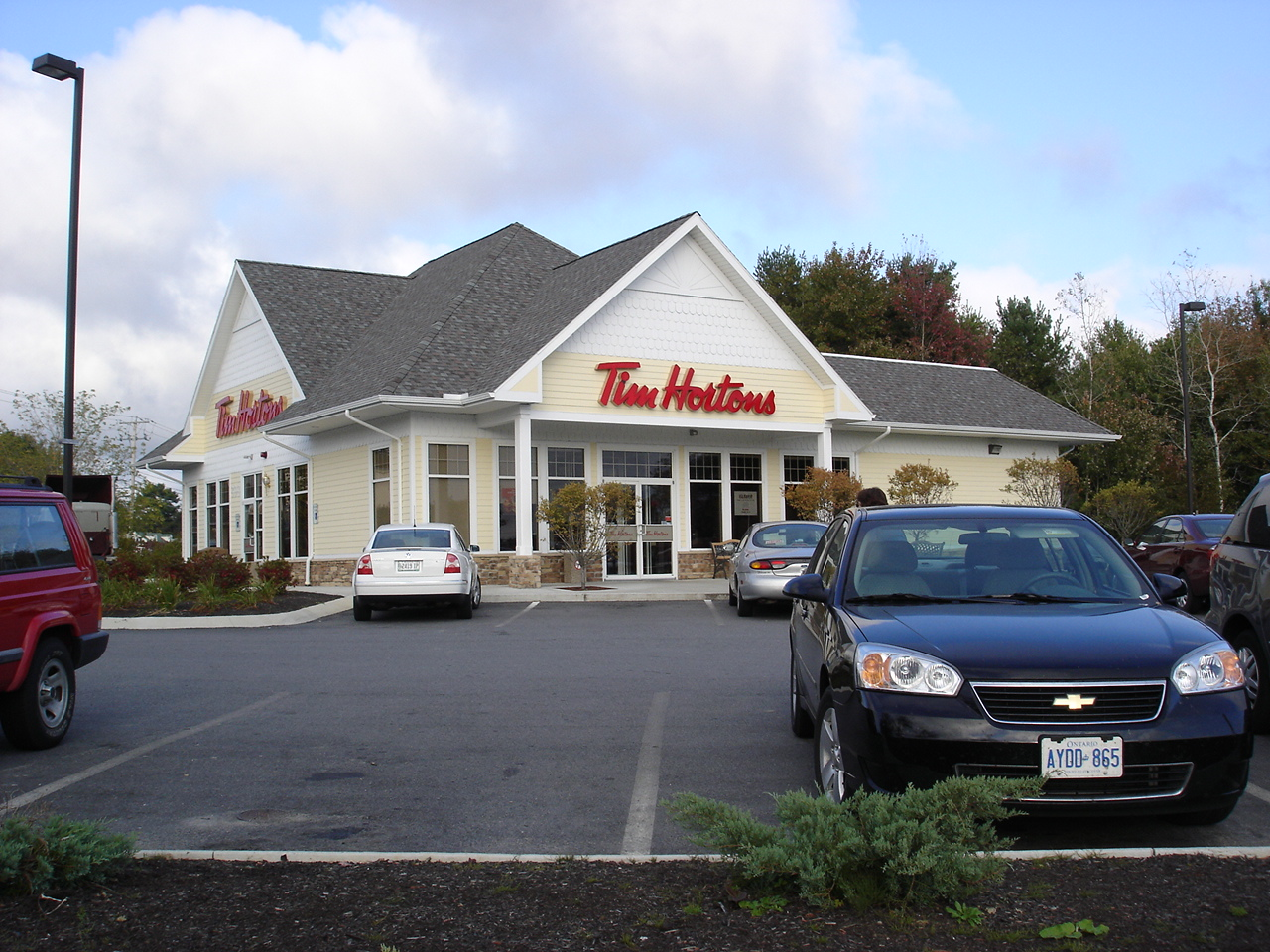
A Tim Hortons in Maine. The company's expansion into the U.S. began in bordering U.S. states.

In 1984, the chain returned to the U.S. with a location in Tonawanda, New York. Starting in the mid-1990s, however, the chain began expanding in the U.S. by acquiring former locations from fast-food chains. In 1996 and 1997, thirty-seven former Rax locations in Ohio, Kentucky, and West Virginia were bought by Wendy's International Inc.; 30 of these were converted to Tim Hortons, while the others became Wendy's franchise locations. Thirty-five closed Hardee's stores in the Detroit area were also purchased with the intention of being converted. By 2004, the chain had also acquired 42 Bess Eaton coffee and donut restaurants in southern New England. Several combination Wendy's/Tim Hortons units were opened in the US; both in the "traditional" markets of Maine and Buffalo, where there were well over 180 locations as of 2011, and in the markets entered through acquisition.

In October 2008, Tim Hortons announced a plan to add 82 locations in Tops Markets stores in the United States.

On July 13, 2009, Tim Hortons opened stores in New York City at former Dunkin' Donuts locations operated by the Riese Organization. One of the stores is at Madison Square Garden, where Horton played as a member of the New York Rangers from 1969 to 1971. In November 2010, Tim Hortons announced it was closing 36 stores in the northeastern United States due to high competition with New England–based Dunkin' Donuts and Au Bon Pain. The stores, which made less than half the average company per-store sales, were concentrated heavily in the areas around Providence, Rhode Island, and Hartford, Connecticut, the former of which also has a concentration of stores from the locally competing Honey Dew Donuts chain, with some 150 outlets in Rhode Island and Southeastern Massachusetts. In the announcement, the chain stated that it will concentrate its efforts on its core markets such as western Canada. In the same statement, the company announced the sale of its portion of distribution company Maidstone Bakeries to Tim Hortons' European partners. It will use the CA$400 million generated by the sale for a stock buyback.

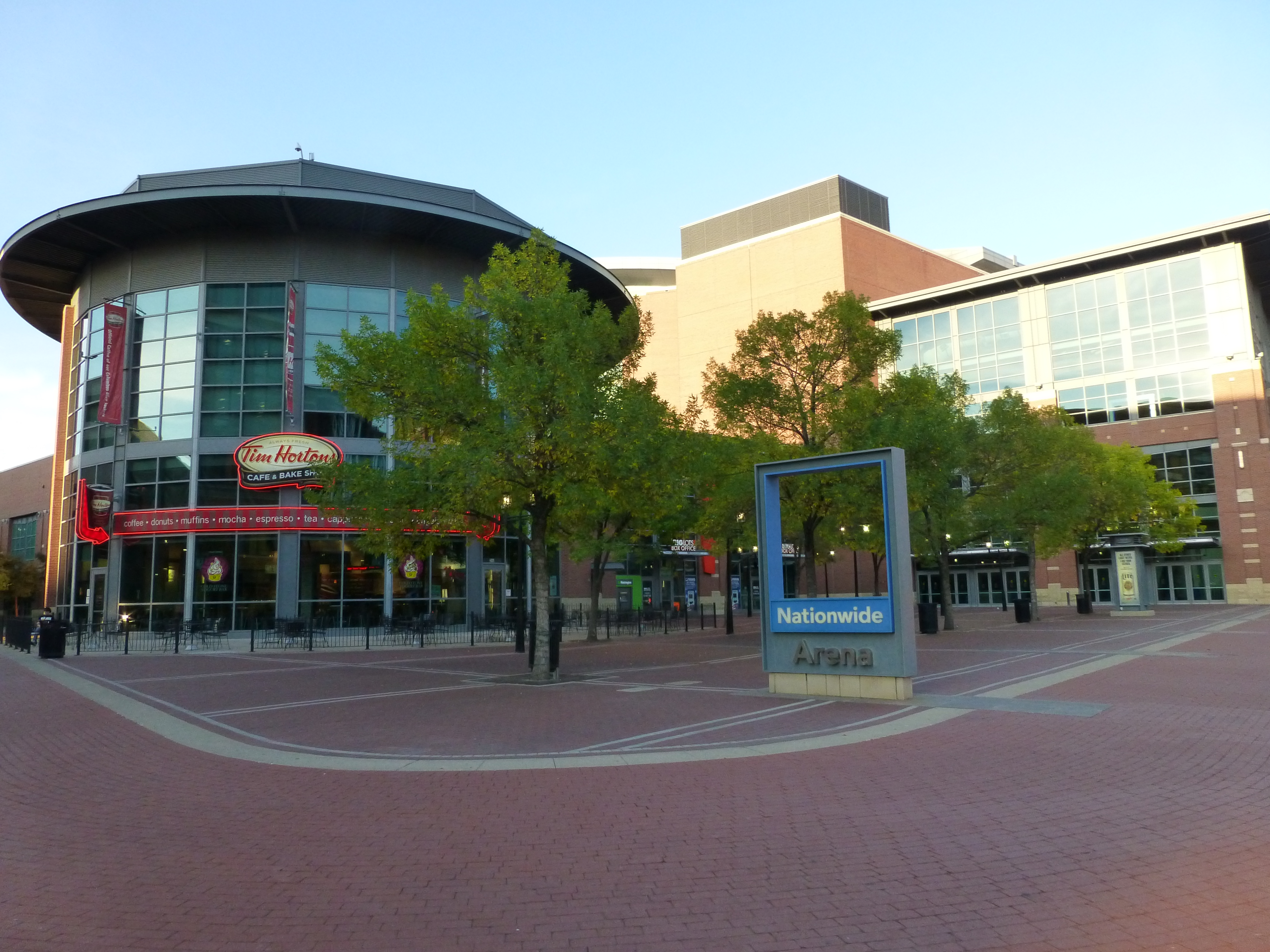
A Tim Hortons store at Nationwide Arena, in Columbus, Ohio. The company has opened several stores in multi-purpose arenas.

In 2010, Tim Hortons opened two kiosks at Consol Energy Center (now known as PPG Paints Arena) in Pittsburgh, partly as a test to eventual expansion into Pittsburgh (their closest locations at that point were in the Wheeling, West Virginia/Steubenville, Ohio, area) as well as Pittsburgh Penguins star Sidney Crosby having a longtime sponsorship with the chain as well. In addition, Horton played for the Maple Leafs American Hockey League affiliate, the Pittsburgh Hornets, earlier in his career as well as the Penguins for one season in 1971 to 1972. Aramark, which operated the kiosks, closed them in 2012, however Tim Hortons proceeded to open full-service locations in Pittsburgh and surrounding areas in July 2012. At the time of the entry into Pittsburgh, of the four NHL cities Horton played in (Buffalo, New York City, Toronto, and Pittsburgh), Pittsburgh was the only one without a Tim Hortons location, and was also where Horton met his future wife, Lori.

In 2011, Tim Hortons aggressively expanded into the Grand Rapids, Michigan, region.

In 2012, Tim Hortons began advertising in the Youngstown, Ohio, area in anticipation of an eventual expansion into the Mahoning Valley. The closest location at the time was in Calcutta, Ohio, about 50 miles south of Youngstown. The chain entered the area in July 2012 with the opening of a location in Hermitage, Pennsylvania. This location has since closed, but Tim Hortons would return to the market in the spring of 2019 with the opening of two locations, one in Youngstown and one in Girard, Ohio, though both would suddenly close within weeks of each other by the end of the year.

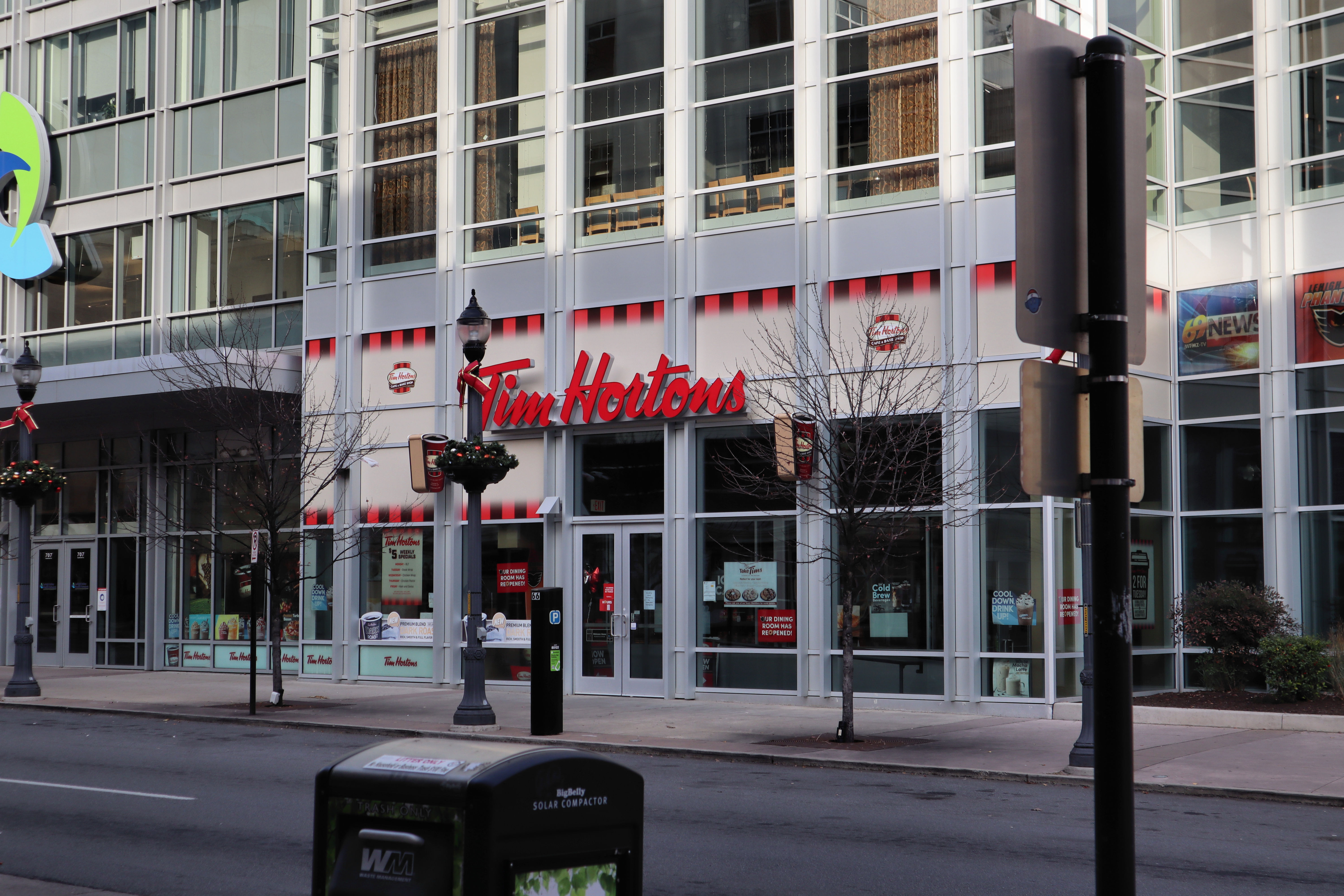
A Tim Hortons in Allentown, Pennsylvania, 2021

As of 2012, the company had expanded across the U.S. states of Connecticut, Indiana, Kentucky, Maine, Massachusetts, Michigan, New York, Ohio, Pennsylvania, Rhode Island, and West Virginia.

On January 7, 2014, Tim Hortons opened a kiosk in what is now the Desert Diamond Arena (where the Arizona Coyotes of the NHL used to play) in Glendale, the first Tim Hortons in Arizona. A flagship Tim Hortons location within the Buffalo area opened at the LECOM Harborcenter on October 29, 2014.

In 2016, Tim Hortons expanded to Minnesota with a store inside Mall of America. However, this location is closed. In 2017, the chain announced an expansion to Northeast Ohio with 105 stores to come to the greater Cleveland area. The first of these opened in the Ellet neighborhood of Akron in July 2019.

In 2020, Tim Hortons partnered with Bolla Market to open "15 to 20 over the next 12 to 18 months" across Long Island. The stores are located inside gas stations.

In 2022, Tim Hortons announced a planned expansion into Georgia and Texas. Over the next five years, it plans to open over 20 new stores in the Atlanta and Columbus, Georgia, areas plus greater Houston, Texas, and Nashville, Tennessee.

On December 22, 2024, Tim Hortons opened their first location in Austin, Texas.

The "largest Tim Hortons in the United States", a restaurant offering 24 hour service, opened in Bryan, Texas, in December 2025.

==== Cayman Islands ====
On April 4, 2023, Tim Hortons announced a new location in Prospect, Grand Cayman. This will be the first Tim Hortons in the Caribbean. The location is first of many planned in the Cayman Islands. The menu will have all the original items, as well as freshly sliced deli sandwiches. The store opened on October 12, 2024.

=== Asia ===
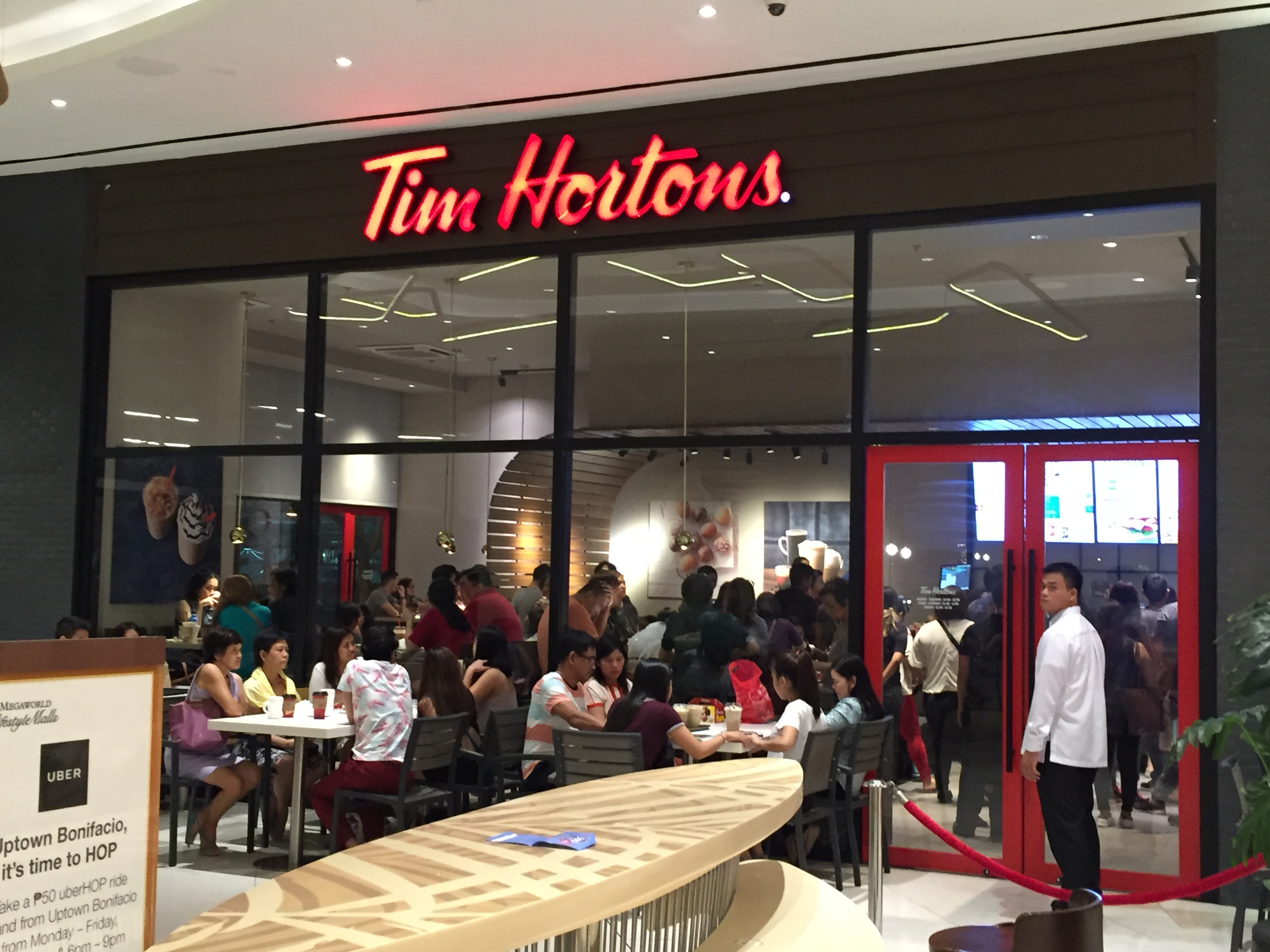
Tim Hortons opened its first branch in the Philippines at Uptown Mall in 2017.

Tim Hortons reportedly had plans by 2013 to enter the large Indian market, which the company denied. In an effort to expand the company following its 2014 merger with Burger King into Restaurant Brands International, Tim Hortons began expansion in Asia in 2017 citing the increasing demand for coffee in large populations. The first Southeast Asian branch was opened in the Philippines on February 28, 2017, at Uptown Mall in Bonifacio Global City, Taguig. Siera Bearchell, Miss Universe Canada 2016, was present for the ribbon-cutting ceremony. As of December 2023, there are 52 locations operating in the Philippines.

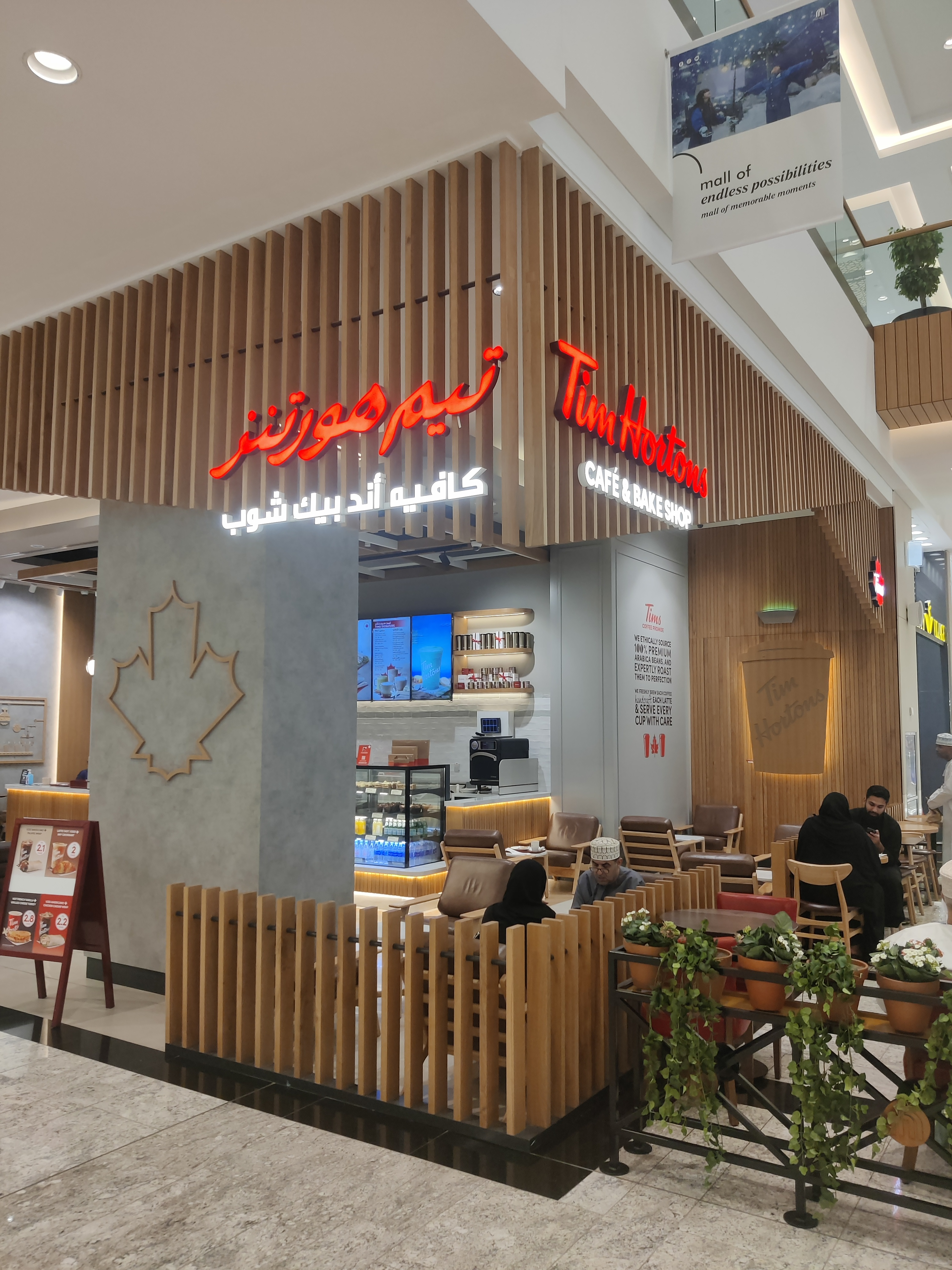
Tim Hortons in the Mall of Oman, Muscat, Oman. Note the Arabic signage.

Through franchise partnership with Dubai-based Apparel Group, Tim Hortons entered the United Arab Emirates in 2011 with locations in Abu Dhabi, Dubai and Fujairah. The first opening took place in September 2011. As of December 2013, Tim Hortons has nineteen stores in the United Arab Emirates, two in Oman and two in Saudi Arabia. They plan to open up to one hundred and twenty stores over the next five years in the Persian Gulf area, with a focus on Qatar, Bahrain, Kuwait, Oman, and the United Arab Emirates. Kuwait has Tim Hortons at The Gate Mall in Egaila, at Promenade Mall in Hawalli, and at The Avenues Mall at Al Rai.

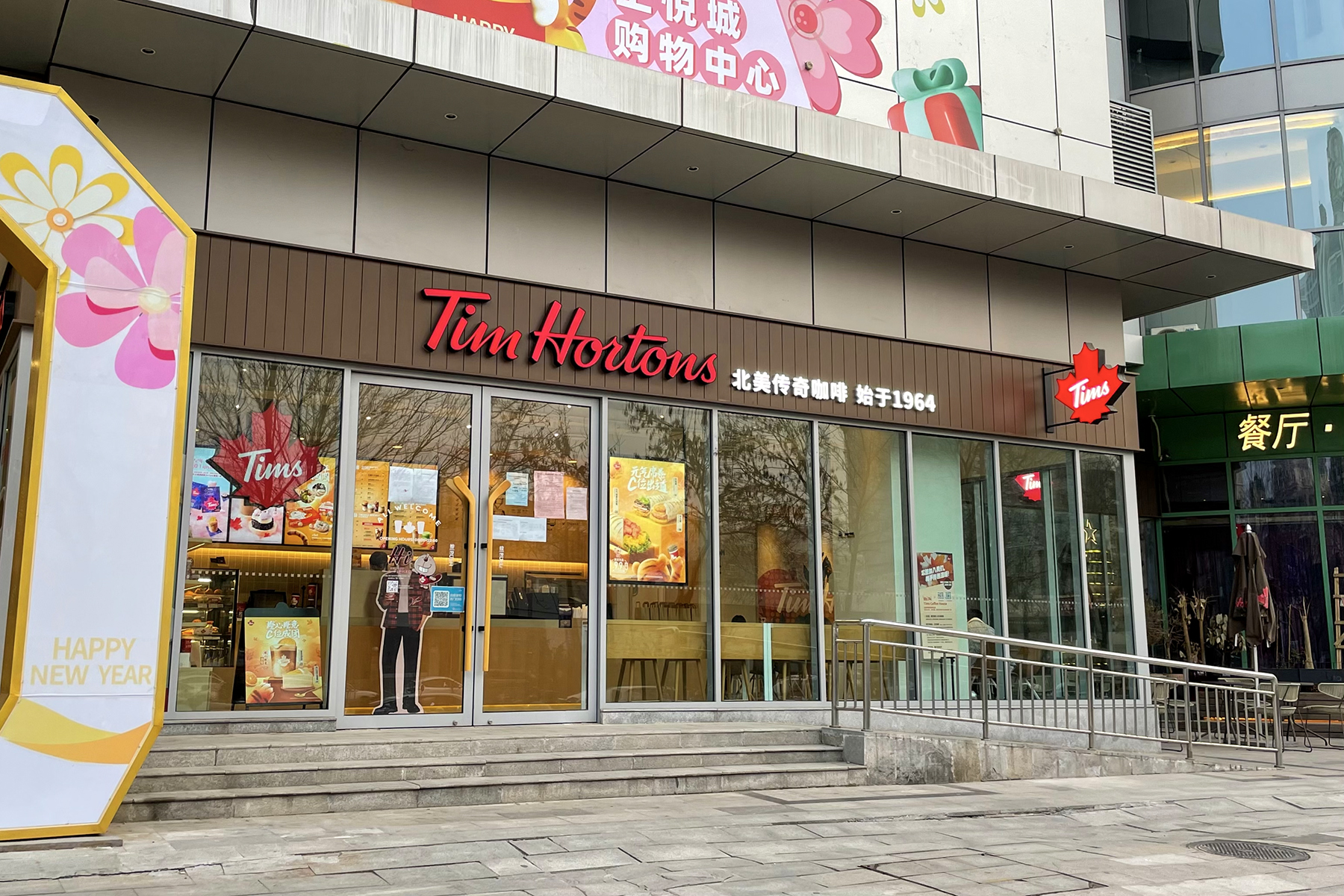
A Tim Hortons store in Zhengzhou, China, 2022

In July 2018, Tim Hortons announced that they would open 1,500 stores in China. The first of these opened on February 26, 2019, in Huangpu District, Shanghai. By December 31, 2024, the number of stores nationwide has reached 1,022, covering 82 cities.

The first Tim Hortons location in Thailand opened on January 18, 2020, at Samyan Mitrtown Mall in Bangkok through a franchise partnership with Thailand-based WeEat Co. As of January 2021, there are 10 locations operating in the country.

The first two Tim Hortons locations in India opened on August 11, 2022, in New Delhi and Gurugram, followed by a third location, in New Delhi, on August 31, 2022.

On February 11, 2023, Tim Hortons opened four locations in DHA, Lahore, and Gulberg, and announced to open more locations in other major cities of Pakistan. In January 2024, Tim Hortons opened another store in Pakistan, this time in Islamabad.

In 2023, Japanese conglomerate Marubeni Corporation announced that they were planning to open a Tim Hortons location in Singapore, Malaysia, and to open another in Indonesia, in 2024. The location in Singapore officially opened at VivoCity on November 17, 2023. On August 30, 2024, Tim Hortons opened its first ever Tim's Signature at 313@Somerset, Singapore which sells more upmarket coffee options, such as single-origin and filter brews. As of December 2025, Tim Hortons has 15 outlets in Singapore including Tim's Signature. In 2026, Tim Hortons Singapore became halal-certified.

Tim Hortons first Malaysian store opened at IOI City Mall - the country's largest mall - in Sepang, Selangor in August 2024.

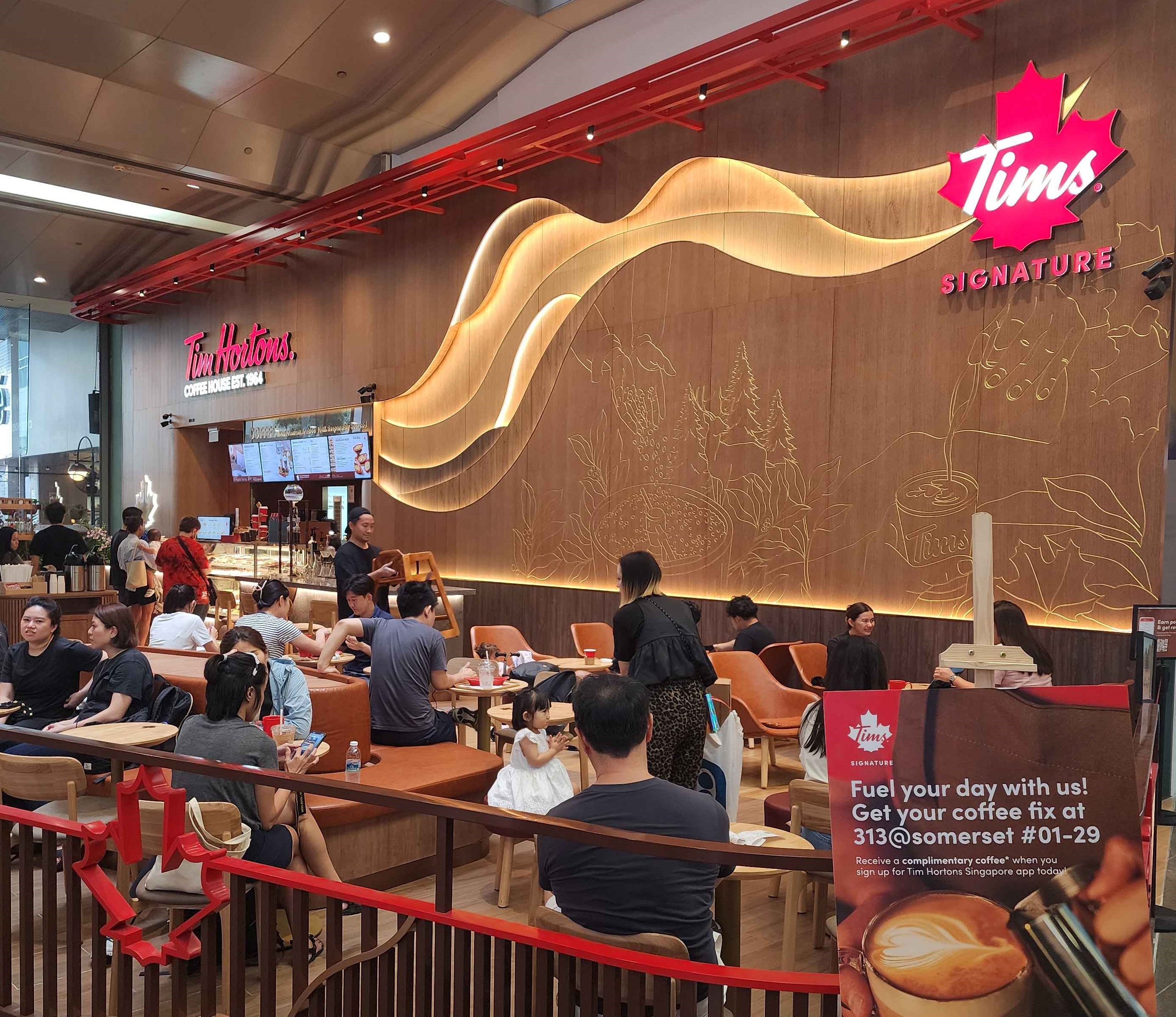
A Tim's Signature store in Somerset, Singapore, 2024

In May 2023, Tim Hortons announced plans to expand into South Korea. In September 2023, officials announced that Tim Hortons would open its first Korean location in Gangnam District, Seoul, within the year. As of October 2024, Tim Hortons has expanded to 13 stores in South Korea.

=== Europe ===
==== United Kingdom and Ireland ====
Tim Hortons' products have been available in Ireland and the United Kingdom at some Spar convenience stores since 2006 and Tesco supermarkets. Tim Hortons' other international expansions include a small outlet at the Dublin Zoo. Tim Hortons coffee and donuts were being sold at small self-service counters in 50 Spar stores in the UK and Ireland as of April 30, 2007.

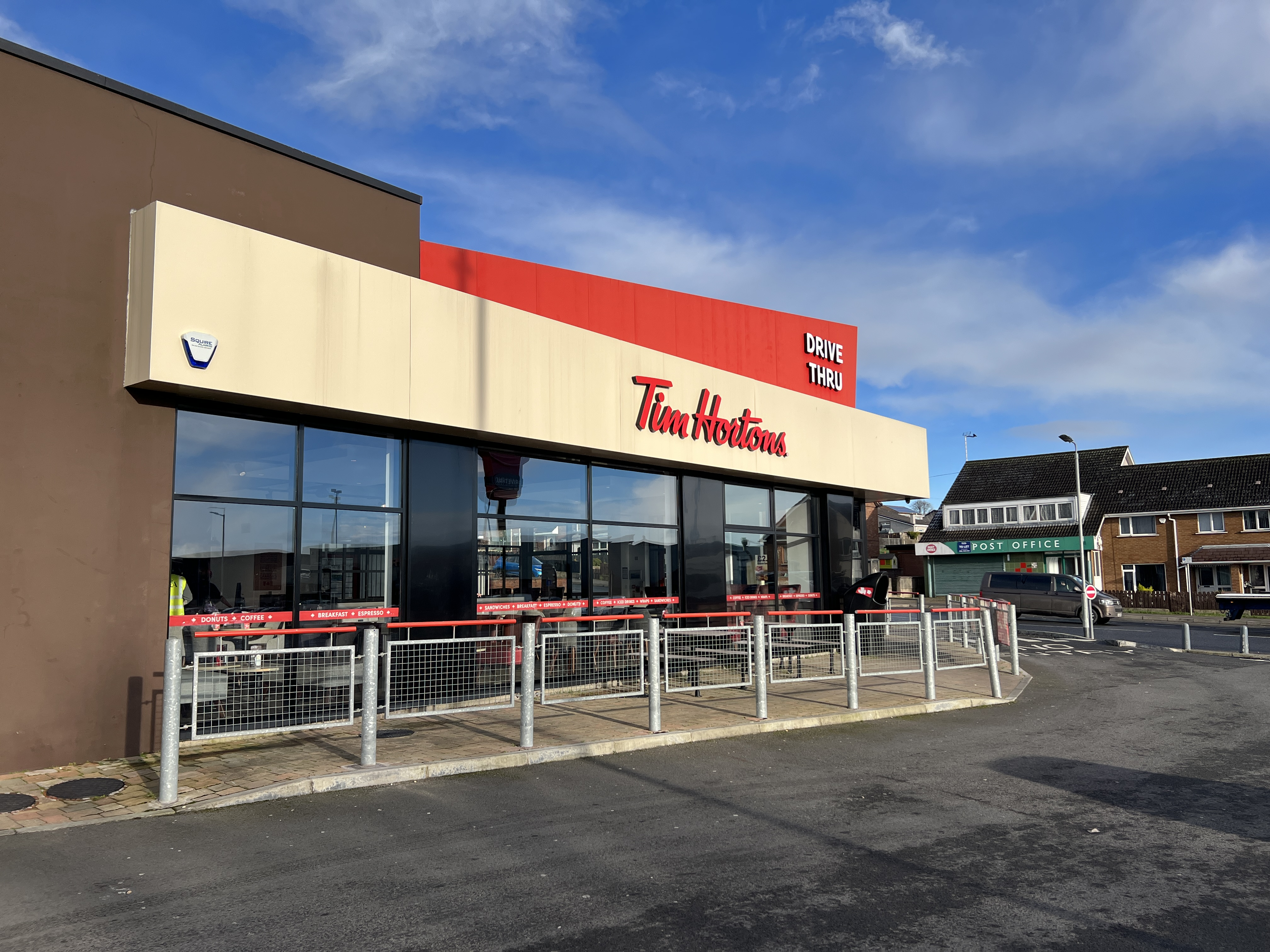
A Tim Hortons in Cookstown, Northern Ireland, in 2023

In 2016, Tim Hortons announced that they would be opening stores in the United Kingdom starting in 2017. Glasgow saw the first UK store open its doors on June 2, 2017, with a further store opening in Bishopbriggs in November 2017. In November 2017, two stores in Cardiff opened, as well as a store opening in Dunfermline. In December 2017, two further stores were opened in Trafford in the towns of Sale and Altrincham. On December 20, 2017, the chain opened a store in the Golden Square Shopping Centre in Warrington. Tim Hortons opened its first two stores in Northern Ireland in 2018: one on Fountain Street in Belfast city centre, and another drive-thru store at the Connswater Retail Park in East Belfast. With the opening of the Braintree and Stockport (Greater Manchester) branches in February 2022, Tim Hortons had 47 locations in the United Kingdom. By January this had increased to 73 locations, with at least a further three locations in development. In March 2023 they opened a branch in Westwood Cross in Thanet, Kent.

The first Tim Hortons location in the Republic of Ireland was reported to be opening in Limerick in 2022, however this did not materialize.

==== Spain ====
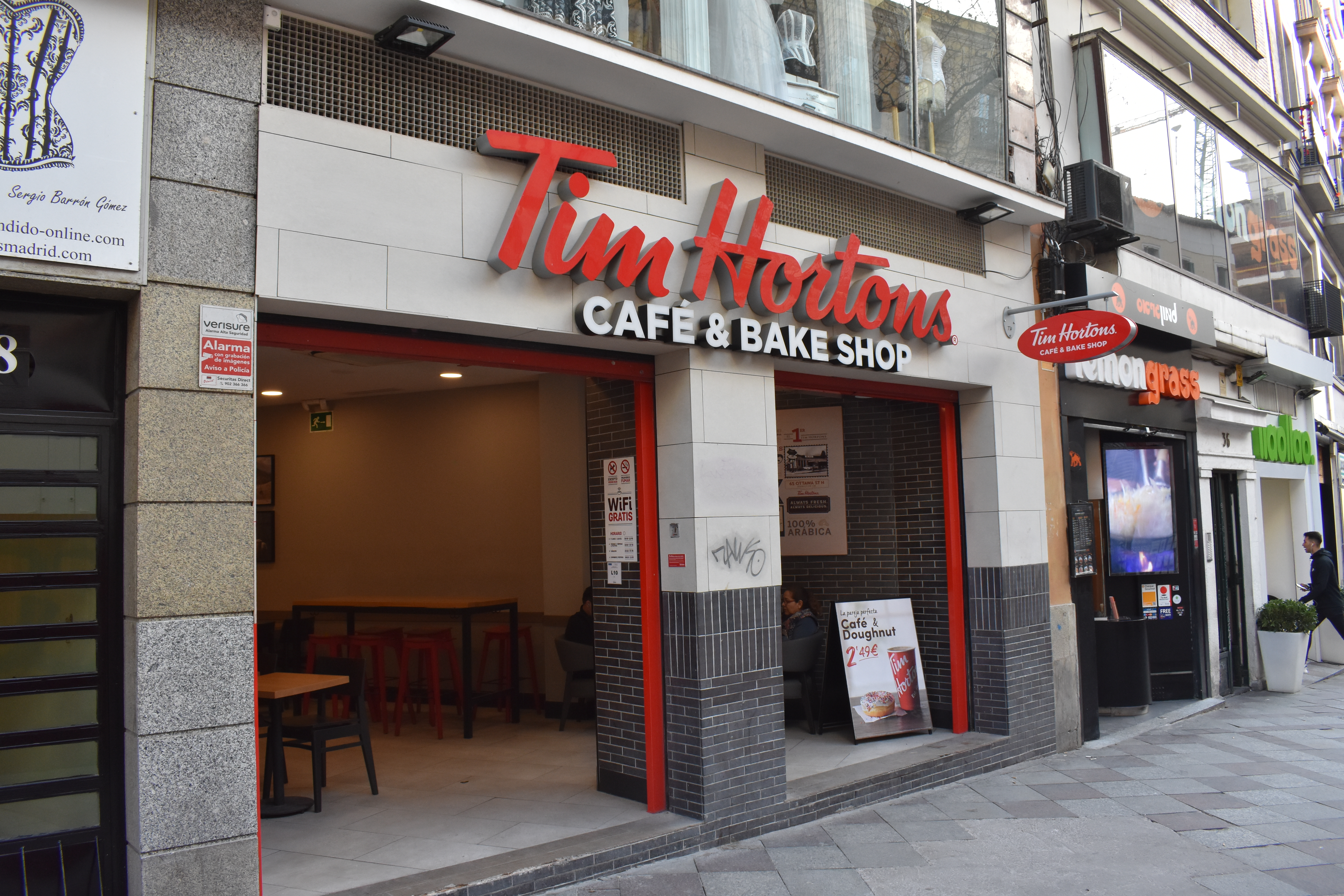
A Tim Hortons in Madrid, Spain. The company opened its first location in Spain in 2017.

In December 2017, Tim Hortons opened two stores in the centre of Madrid and later opened another in the city of Pozuelo de Alarcón in the Community of Madrid. The menu also includes typical Spanish drinks apart from the typical drinks of a Tim Hortons.

==== Andorra ====
Despite the fact that the Principality of Andorra is a sovereign country, the Tim Hortons shop in El Pas de la Casa, Andorra, is listed on the Spanish Tim Hortons website.

== Menu ==
Tim Hortons' first stores offered only two products – coffee and donuts. Aside from its coffee, tea, hot chocolate, and donuts, the menu now contains a number of other baked goods, such as bagels – of which the brand sells one out of every two in the Canadian food service industry. Nutritional information on most menu items is made available by the company in a two-page brochure and online. The brochure does not list ingredient information. Most of the time Tim Hortons' menu contains many of the same items across different locations. However, the pricing may vary since it is a franchise so the cost of each item may be slightly different depending on the owner of the location, as well as the province in which the franchise operates.

=== Coffee and beverages ===
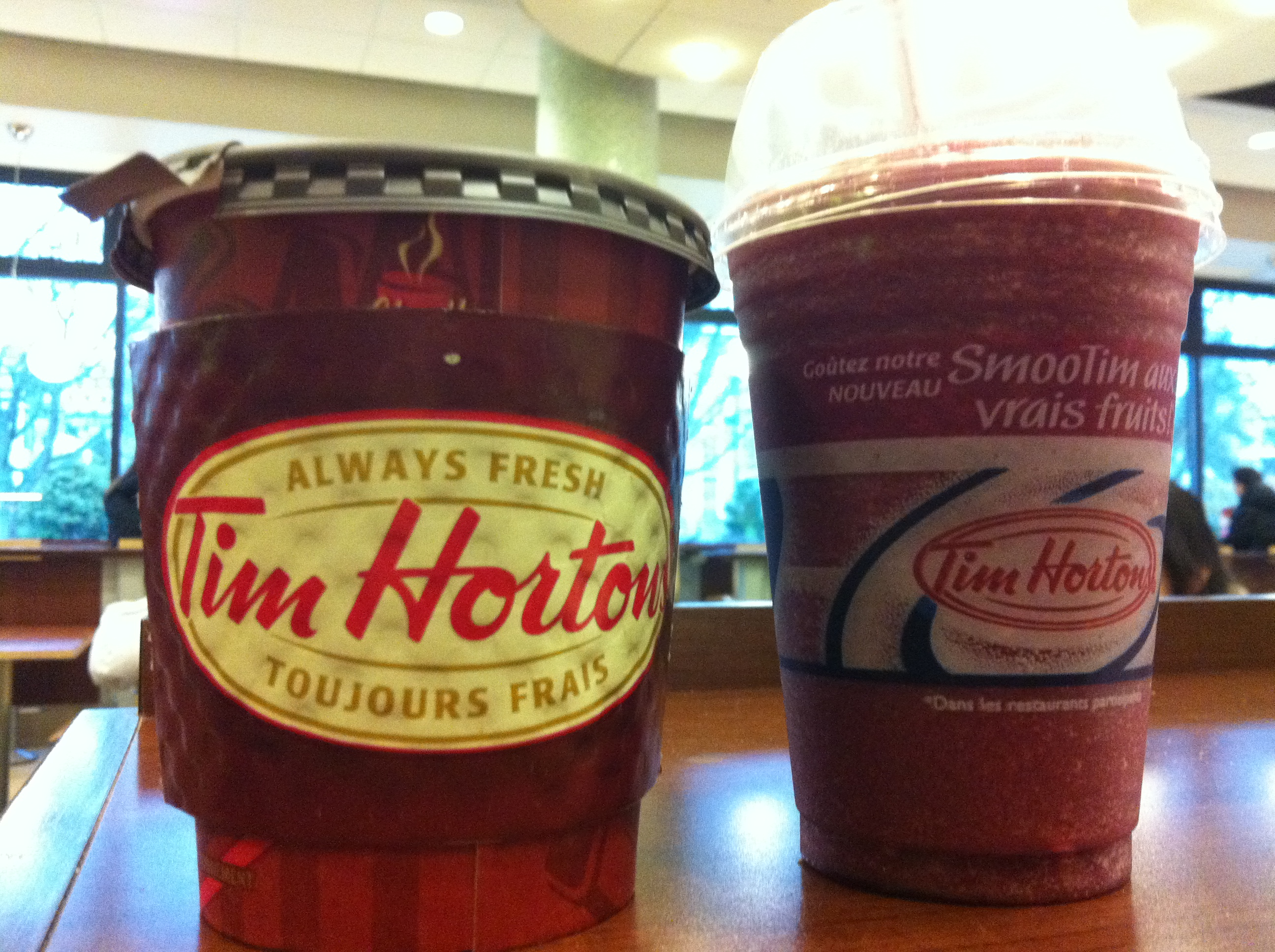
Tim Hortons coffee and smoothie in 2011

Tim Hortons sells coffee, tea, hot chocolate, and soft drinks. In the mid-1990s the chain moved into specialty and premium items such as flavoured cappuccino, iced cappuccino, and iced coffee.

Despite an expansion in their food offerings around 2009, the brand remained heavily dependent on coffee sales. In 2009, it was reported that 60% of their sales occur in the morning, and of that more than 50% is coffee. The coffee served is a blend of 100% arabica beans. The "original blend" is a medium, balanced roast that is the most popular served coffee in Canada. The chain has an "always fresh" policy where coffee is served within 20 minutes of brewing.

In November 2011, the company announced that they would be adding espresso machines in 1,000 of their locations, later that month. On April 16, 2012, the brand launched frozen lemonade, in two flavours: original and raspberry. On August 15, 2014, the company added a dark roast coffee blend as an alternative.

=== Food items ===
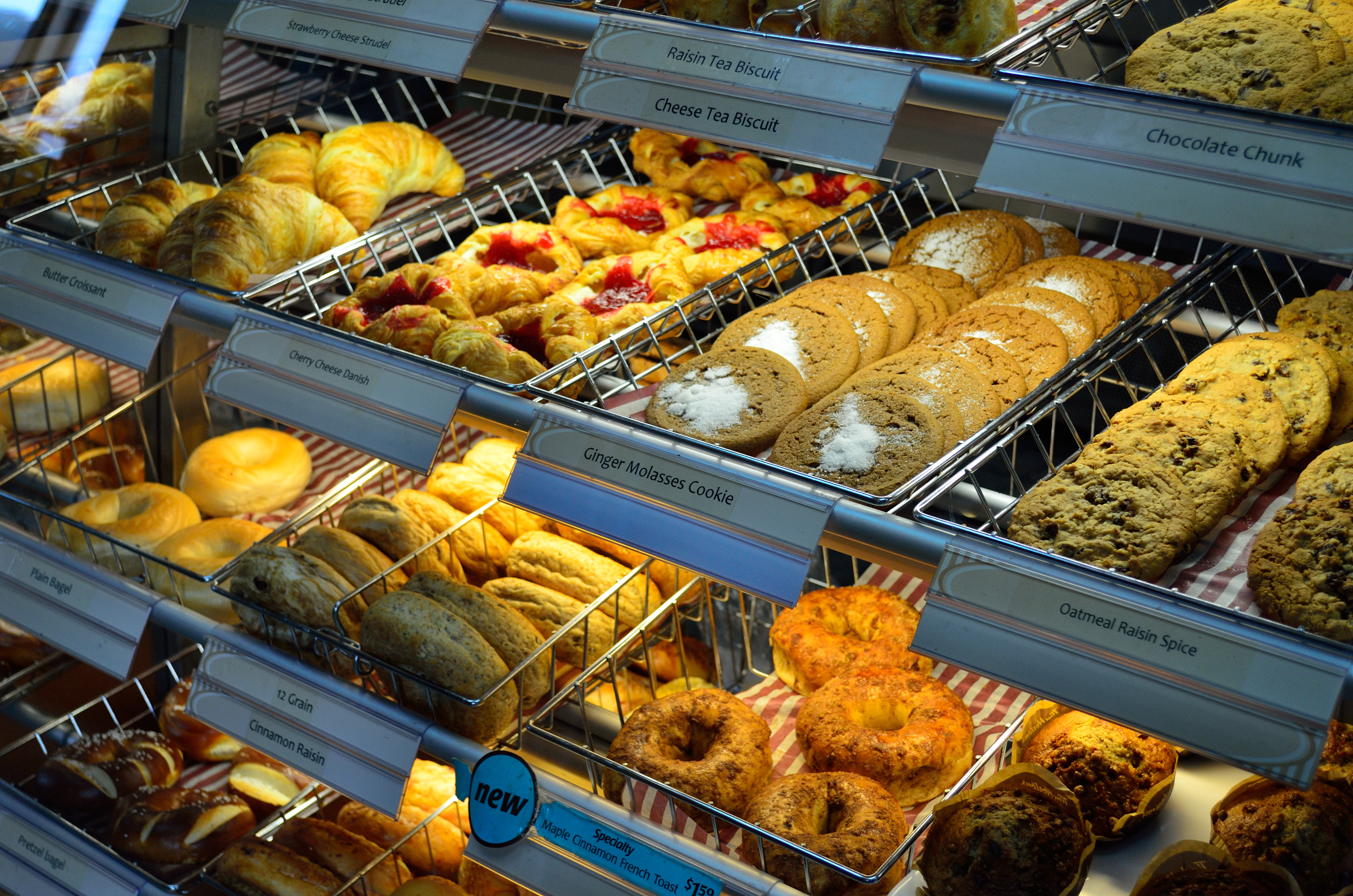
Tim Hortons baked goods in 2015

The menu contains a number of other baked goods, such as donut holes (branded as Timbits), muffins, croissants, tea biscuits, cookies, rolls, danishes, and bagels. The dutchie is a Canadian donut popularized by the Tim Hortons chain.

Since the mid-1990s, the chain has moved into other areas beyond donut and coffee, including specialty items such as New York-style cheesecake, as well as a selection of food items for lunch that include soups, chilli, and submarine sandwiches. In the autumn of 2006, the chain released out a breakfast sandwich, consisting of either a biscuit, English muffin, or bagel sandwiched with an egg patty, processed cheese slice, and ham, bacon, or sausage. In October 2007, they launched a chicken fajita wrap, which contained spiced chicken and sautéed vegetables. This was discontinued and replaced a year later with the barbecue and ranch chicken wrap snackers. In December 2007, they introduced hash browns and the "Bagel B.E.L.T.", a breakfast sandwich of bacon, egg, lettuce, and tomato on a bagel. In February 2009, they announced co-branding with American ice cream parlour Cold Stone Creamery. The deal called for each chain to convert 50 stores into dual-operation franchises, for a total of 100 stores. The idea was successfully tested at two stores in Rhode Island. Despite this expansion, the brand remained heavily dependent on coffee sales. In February 2014, Tim Hortons announced that the dutchie timbit was discontinued due to low popularity.

Despite being offered at other major Canadian restaurant chains, poutine (largely seen as Canada's signature dish), had never been a regular menu item at Tim Hortons. In June 2018, Tim Hortons introduced a limited time poutine across Canada, using seasoned potato wedges instead of the typical French fries. The poutine received mixed responses on social media.

In Canada, the company began to offer hamburgers on the lunch menu in 2017. In an attempt to attract customers with a healthier option, Tim Hortons offered a hamburger filled with the "Beyond Meat" meatless option. The offering of hamburgers was risky for the company in their attempt to compete with the popular, large hamburger chains such as McDonald's. Wendy's and Burger King in Canada. Ironically, Burger King had acquired Tim Hortons in 2014 and was running it as a separate subsidiary and had supply chain mechanisms already in place to supply Tim Hortons with hamburger items. However, after only a brief period, consumers did not respond well to Tim Hortons offering of hamburgers or the "Beyond Meat" variety. With poor national sales, subsequently in 2019, hamburgers were removed from the menus at the Canadian Tim Horton's stores.

On April 17, 2024, Tim Hortons introduced flatbread pizzas to expand on their lunch/dinner menu. The pizzas are available in four flavours: bacon everything, chicken parmesan, pepperoni, and simply cheese. The fifth flavour Spicy Rosé was introduced in October 2024.

==== Baking methods and lawsuit ====
Coupled with the expansion and the expanded menu came the outsourcing of baked goods. Donuts, which used to be made at night to be ready for the morning rush, are now parbaked – partly cooked and then frozen and delivered to every restaurant in Canada from Brantford, Ontario. Each restaurant bakes and finishes the product throughout the day. As of April 2007, many of the various muffin batters were being revoked, as frozen, pre-made and pre-wrapped muffins were being introduced at Tim Hortons locations.

Tim Hortons' switch to the parbaking system disappointed some customers, who noted that it contradicts the chain's "always fresh" slogan. David Swick reported in the Halifax Daily News on September 19, 2003, that Tim Hortons outlets in Atlantic Canada would no longer serve fresh donuts, but rather donuts that had been remotely factory-fried and then frozen and shipped. In 2008, two franchisees initiated a class-action lawsuit against the parent company for the switch to parbaking, "claiming breach of contract, breach of duty of fair dealing, negligent misrepresentation, and unjust enrichment". The lawsuit cited that parbaking tripled the franchisee's fixed cost to produce a donut (from 6 cents per donut to 18 cents), required the purchase of new freezers and microwaves, and reduced profitability for the franchises while increasing profits for the parent company. Franchise owners are required to purchase food products from the Brantford-based parbaking company owned by IAWS Group PLC, and had originally been told the price of each donut would be 11 or 12 cents (and each Timbit 4.6 cents). The case was dismissed in February 2012.

A 2009 New York Times article contrasted the baked from scratch at stores' approach of Krispy Kreme and some Dunkin' Donuts locations compared to the "flash frozen" and shipped Tim Hortons method. The Times article also noted an apparent scarcity of donut specialties such as the dutchie at newly opened Tim Hortons stores in New York City. Noting that "American visitors tend to flock to the sweets," including the "raisin-studded Dutchie", the Times found redemption among Canadians that the brand was once again a Canada-based company while contrasting the way politicians in the U.S. "woo" soccer moms while in Canada they "go after Tim Hortons voters".

== Marketing ==
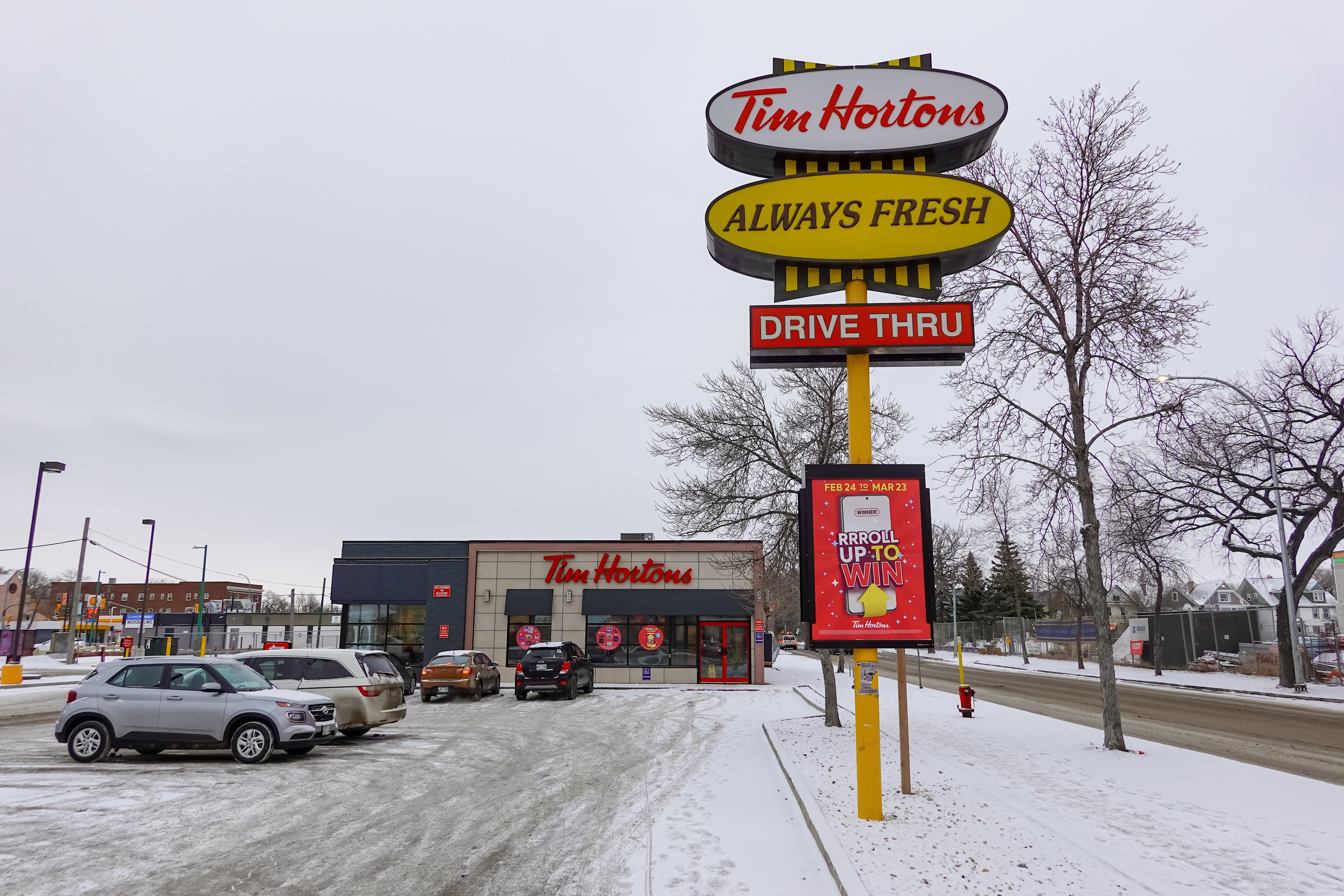
An outlet featuring the classic slogan "Always Fresh", in Winnipeg, Manitoba

Tim Hortons' advertising slogans have included "You've Always Got Time for Tim Hortons" and starting in the mid-2000s, "Always Fresh. Always Tim Hortons."

Canadian Business named Tim Hortons as the best-managed brand in Canada in 2004 and 2005.

From 2005 to 2023, Tim Hortons was the title sponsor of the Brier, the annual Canadian men's curling championships, along with the Canadian Ringette Championships.

In September 2006, Tim Hortons courted controversy by mandating that employees were not to wear red as part of the Red Fridays campaign by families of the military to show support for Canadian troops. Within a few hours, Tim Hortons partially reversed its position and has allowed staff in Ontario stores to wear red ribbons or pins to show support for the wear red on Fridays campaign.

In June 2009, Tim Hortons USA created Twitter and Facebook pages to drive online traffic. After Tim Hortons had agreed to provide 250 cups of free coffee in 2009 for a "Marriage and Family Day" hosted by the National Organization for Marriage, the company removed its sponsorship after it was revealed that the NOM was an organization that campaigns against gay marriage. The company stated the sponsorship was a violation of the company's policy not to sponsor events "representing religious groups, political affiliates or lobby groups."

On July 12, 2013, it was announced that Tim Hortons had acquired the naming rights to the stadium being built in Hamilton, Ontario. In 2014, Tim Hortons Field became the home stadium of the Hamilton Tiger-Cats.

In June 2015, Tim Hortons pulled a four-week advertising campaign by energy company Enbridge from its in-store "Tims TV" service after three weeks following a petition by the advocacy group, SumOfUs. Despite the ads being part of a general "Life Takes Energy" campaign introduced by Enbridge the previous year, the group argued that Tim Hortons' airing of the ads implied an endorsement of controversial projects under development by Enbridge, such as the Northern Gateway pipeline, going on to say that "Enbridge's ad campaign uses attractive actors, cute kids and high production values to hide the real truth—its tar sands project will put ecosystems, salmon and wildlife in danger, create virtually no local jobs, and accelerate climate change." The decision to pull the ads, however, resulted in a boycott of Tim Hortons led by Wildrose Party leader Brian Jean, who felt that the decision was an attack on Alberta's oil industry because Enbridge is one of the province's top-employing companies.

In November 2021, the chain began a promotion with Toronto singer Justin Bieber, which included the release of limited edition "Tim Biebs" Timbits and accompanying merchandise.

Tim Hortons is also the primary sponsor of Forge FC, a Canadian professional soccer club based in Hamilton, Ontario.

As part of the brand's 60th anniversary celebrations in 2024, a musical titled The Last Timbit was produced at the Elgin and Winter Garden Theatres in Toronto.

=== Canadian cultural fixture ===
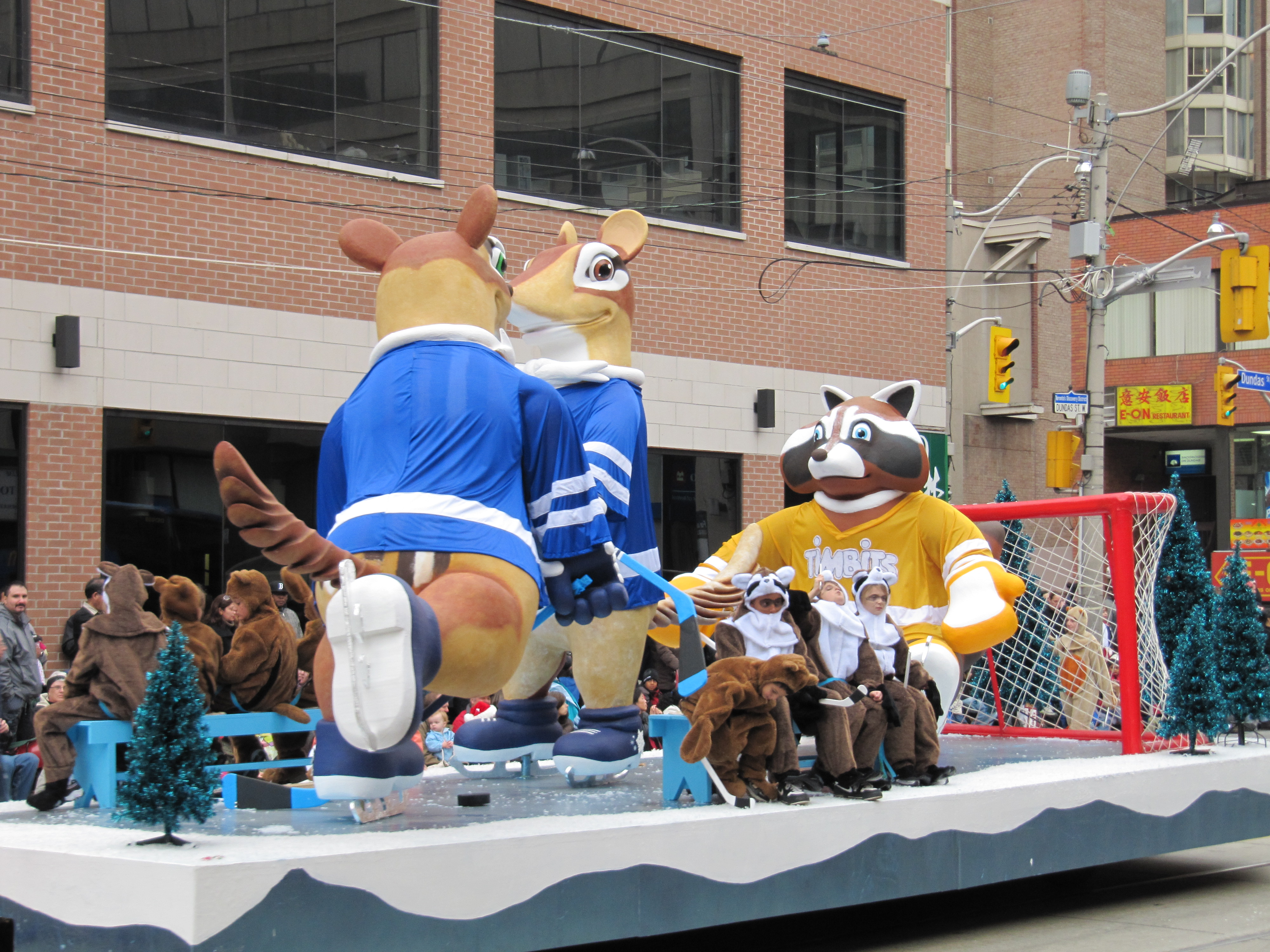
Parade float featuring the logo for Timbits, a Tim Hortons product, on the raccoon playing ice hockey at the Toronto Santa Claus Parade

Tim Hortons is popularly known as "Timmies" or "Timmy's". The ubiquity of Tim Hortons, through the wide expansion of its outlets, makes it a prominent feature of Canadian life; Canadians eat more donuts per capita and have more donut outlets per capita than any other nation. Tim Hortons' prevalence in the coffee and donut market has led to its branding as a Canadian cultural icon. The media routinely refer to its iconic status, despite this being a relatively recent development; there were only a few outlets before the chain's expansion in the late 1990s and 2000s. A series of Tim's television commercials promotes this idea by showing vignettes of Canadians abroad and their homesickness for Tim Hortons. Canadian author Pierre Berton once wrote: "In so many ways the story of Tim Hortons is the essential Canadian story. It is a story of success and tragedy, of big dreams and small towns, of old-fashioned values and tough-fisted business, of hard work and of hockey." Commentator Rex Murphy posited that the reason Tim Hortons "transmuted into a hallowed piece of Canadiana" was perhaps consumers' "reverse-preference" against the sudden penetration of Starbucks in the 1990s.

Other commentators have bemoaned the rise of Tim Hortons as a national symbol. Rudyard Griffiths, director of The Dominion Institute, wrote in the Toronto Star in July 2006 that the ascension of the chain to the status of a cultural icon was a "worrying sign" for Canadian nationalism, adding, "Surely Canada can come up with a better moniker than the Timbit Nation."

The recognition of Tim Hortons as a Canadian icon has permeated into American culture as the result of product placement efforts in conjunction with a marketing agency. In the American sitcom How I Met Your Mother, while standing in a Tim Hortons "just around the corner from the Hockey Hall of Fame", Robin, played by Canadian actress Cobie Smulders, called the location the "most Canadian place in the universe". The chain has embraced this comment as an unofficial slogan and has used it in promotional advertisements to emphasize its fixture in modern Canadian culture. The chain has been featured in the TV series Homeland. Another TV show that has Tim Hortons products making an appearance is The Last Ship.

Stan Mikita's Donuts from the film Wayne's World is supposed to be a parody of Tim Hortons.

=== Partnerships ===
==== Cold Stone Creamery ====
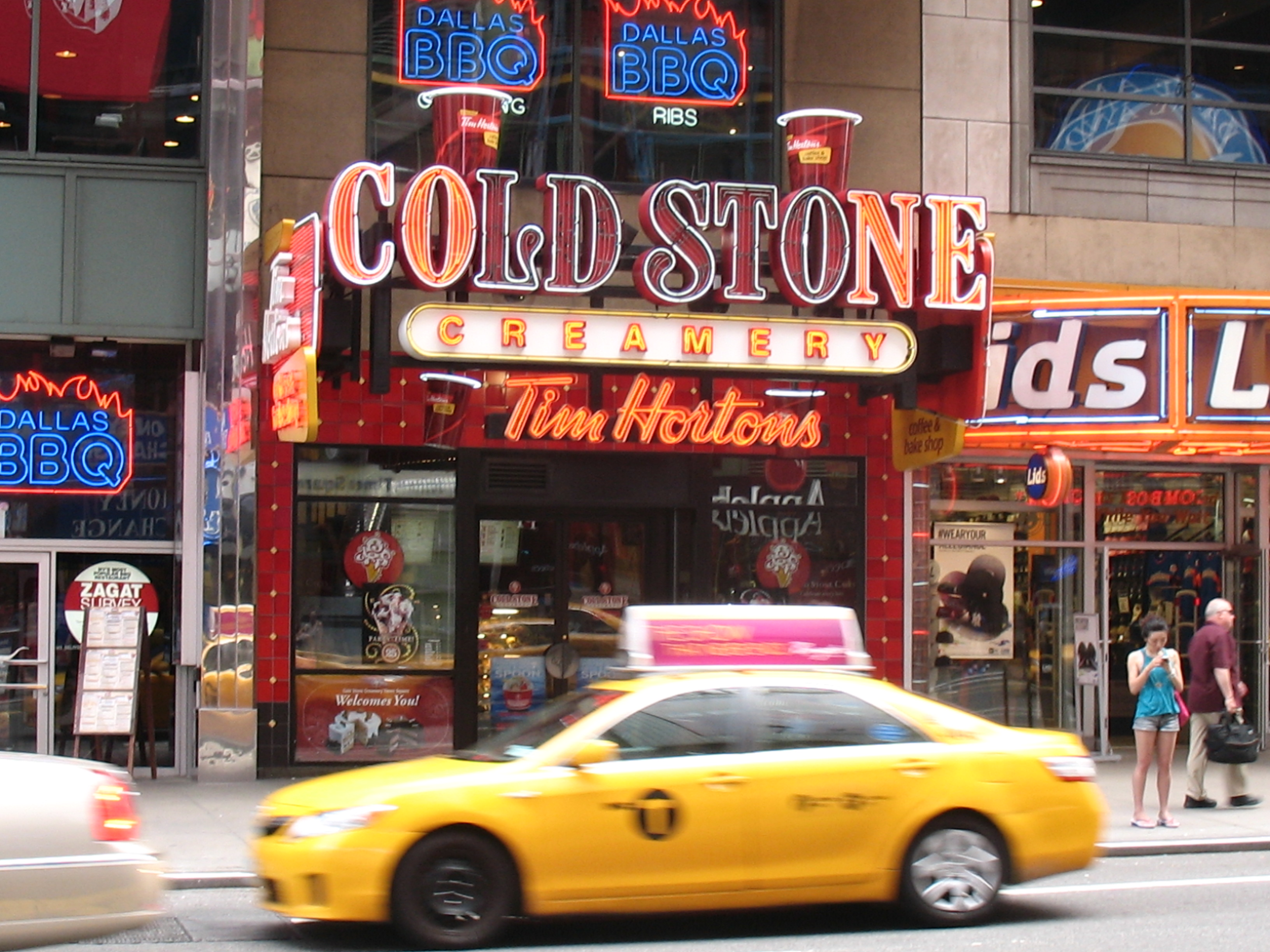
Shared location with Cold Stone Creamery in New York City in 2013

Kahala, the parent company of Cold Stone Creamery, announced in February 2009 that it had reached an agreement with Tim Hortons to open up to 100 co-branded stores in the United States after successfully testing two locations in Rhode Island. The most notable co-branded store opened in August 2009 when Tim Hortons moved into three Cold Stone Creamery locations in New York City, including its flagship Times Square location.

In June 2009, Cold Stone Creamery started testing the Canadian market by opening its six co-branded locations with Tim Hortons in Ontario, and began expanding its test markets in Canada, including Alberta, Nova Scotia, Ontario, New Brunswick, and British Columbia, and in the summer of 2010, Cold Stone Creamery moved into six Tim Hortons locations in Quebec and one in each of Charlottetown, and Summerside, PEI. However, in February 2014, Tim Hortons chief executive Marc Caira announced that they will be pulling Cold Stone Creamery from all its Canadian restaurants, although Tim Hortons would maintain its locations in the United States.

==== Military partnerships ====
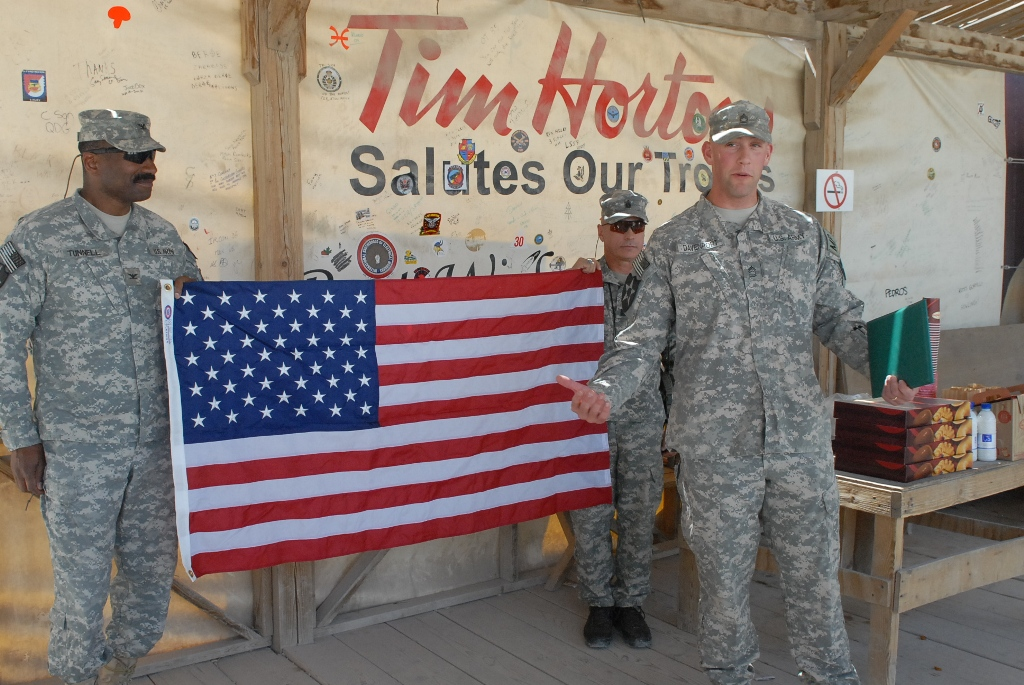
A United States Army sergeant making a speech in front a Tim Hortons coffee shop in Kandahar

Tim Hortons has outlets on at least seven Canadian Forces Bases. TDL Group announced in March 2006, in response to a request by Chief of the Defence Staff, General Rick Hillier, its commitment to open a franchised location at the Canadian Forces operations base in Kandahar, Afghanistan. The new Kandahar location opened on July 1, 2006, in a 40-foot (12 m) trailer on the military base. The 41 staff members of the Kandahar outlet have been drawn from the Canadian Forces Personnel Support Agency who received training on such matters as how to handle a potential nuclear weapons or biological weapons attack before working at the military base. The Canadian Federal government subsidized the operation of the Kandahar outlet in the order of CAD$4–5 million per year. The Kandahar Tim Hortons closed on November 29, 2011, after serving four million cups of coffee and three million donuts over five years.

The first Tim Hortons outlet at a U.S. military base was opened in 2009 at Fort Knox. The following year, a second Tim Hortons outlet was opened at Naval Station Norfolk. As of November 2011, Tim Hortons has five outlets open on four U.S. military bases. Besides the first two, they are also at Naval Air Station Oceana and two locations at the Aberdeen Proving Ground.

==== Harry Potter partnership ====
In August 2026, Tim Hortons announced that it would be releasing a series of themed menu items to mark the 25th anniversary of the release of the first film of the Harry Potter movie franchise as part of its “Back to Hogwarts with Harry Potter” campaign. Menu items included themed donuts and drinks. Harry Potter-themed "quiz nights" were also held at selected stores across Canada.

=== Roll Up the Rim to Win campaign ===
An example of a losing Roll Up the Rim to Win cup in 2007

Each February, Tim Hortons holds a marketing campaign titled "Roll Up the Rim to Win". As of 2007, over 31 million prizes were distributed each year, including cars, televisions, and store products. Customers determine if they have won prizes by unrolling the rim on their paper cups when they have finished their drink, revealing the result underneath. Prizes are not distributed randomly country-wide; each of the company's distribution regions has distinct prize-winning odds. The idea for the campaign began in 1985 when Roger Wilson of one of Tim Hortons' supplier of cups, Lily Cup company, approached Tim Hortons with a new idea to increase their sales. Wilson explained his company had created a new cup design that allowed a message to be printed under the rim; the cup type cost no more than the current one and could enable a promotion or contest. Recognizing the opportunity to promote coffee in the normally weak sales period in the spring, the Roll Up the Rim to Win campaign was first held in 1986 when the biggest prize was a snack box of Timbits. In 2008, over 88% of major prizes were redeemed.

The contest is popular enough that Paul Kind invented the Rimroller (as seen on Dragons' Den), a device for rolling up the rim mechanically.

The contest has seen several controversies including the theft of unrolled cups. In March 2006, two families were fighting over a Toyota RAV4 SUV prize of CA$32,000 value when their daughters found a winning "roll up the rim" coffee cup in a garbage bin of an elementary school in Saint-Jérôme, Quebec. The younger girl had found a cup in the garbage bin and could not roll up the rim, so she requested the help of an older girl. Once the winning cup was revealed, the older girl's family stated that they deserved the prize. Tim Hortons originally stated that they would not intervene in the dispute. A further complication arose when Quebec lawyer Claude Archambault requested a DNA test be done on the cup. He claimed that his unnamed client had thrown out the cup and was the rightful recipient of the prize. On April 19, 2006, Tim Hortons announced that they had decided to award the prize to the younger girl who had initially found the cup. The company has also faced concerns over the amount of additional litter generated by the promotion.

In honour of Canada's sesquicentennial, a special edition of the Roll Up the Rim promotion was held in July 2017, with prizes including an "Ultimate Canadian Vacation" valued at $10,000. In 2018, Tim Hortons began to add digital components to the promotion, via the "Scroll Up the Rim" feature (which gave players a chance at food prizes) on the chain's mobile app. In 2020, as part of environmental initiatives and to promote the chain's new Tims Rewards loyalty program, Tim Hortons announced that it would only distribute Roll Up the Rim cups during the first two weeks of the campaign. Each eligible purchase by a Tims Rewards member during the first half of the promotion was to earn two electronic entries, and one electronic entry in the second two weeks, redeemable via the Tims Rewards mobile app. Any purchase using a reusable cup was to award three entries.

On March 7, 2020, due to the COVID-19 pandemic, Tim Hortons announced that it had cancelled the distribution of physical cups for the promotion due to concerns that the virus could be spread by returned cups, and that the promotion would be conducted solely via the app. The chain had also joined others in temporarily prohibiting the use of reusable cups for similar reasons. The changes from 2020 remained in use through 2024, with the promotion therefore being renamed to "Roll Up to Win". In addition, Tim Hortons announced that every electronic entry would be guaranteed to win Tims Rewards points at a minimum. In February 2025, Tim Hortons announced that physical cups would return to the promotion alongside digital entries for a limited time.

== Community involvement ==
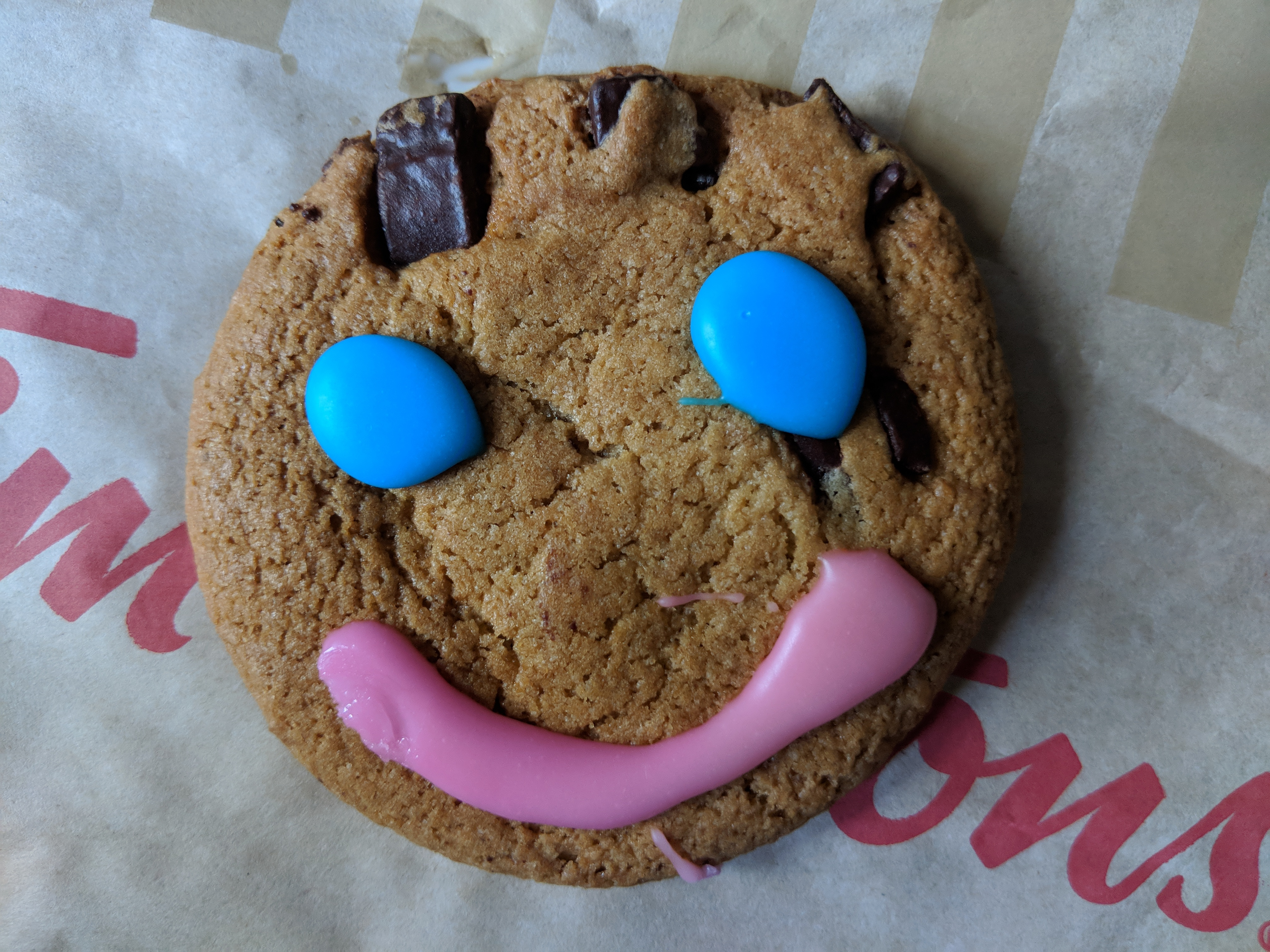
A Smile cookie sold at Tim Hortons. The cookie forms a part of a community outreach program by the company.

Tim Hortons sponsor community outreach programs include Free Skating, Free Swimming, Earn-a-Bike, Remembrance Day, Food Drives, and the Smile Cookie programs (not to be confused with the similar Smiley Cookie sold at regional chain Eat'n Park), as well as community clean-up projects. In a collaboration with Canadian DJ Deadmau5, the Smile Cookie program raised $7.8 million.

The store promotes itself through the Tim Horton Children's Foundation. Founded by Ron Joyce, the foundation sponsors thousands of underprivileged children from Canada and the United States to go to one of six high-class summer camps in Parry Sound, Ontario; Tatamagouche, Nova Scotia; Kananaskis Country, Alberta; Quyon, Quebec; Campbellsville, Kentucky; St. George, Ontario; and most recently Whiteshell Provincial Park, Manitoba.

The foundation's highest-profile fundraiser is Camp Day, held annually on the Wednesday of the first full week in June. All proceeds from coffee sales at most Tim Hortons locations, as well as proceeds from related activities held that day, are donated to the foundation. Small stores in Esso Service Stations do not donate coffee proceeds on Camp Day.

Joyce's work with the Tim Horton Children's Foundation earned him the Gary Wright Humanitarian Award in 1991, presented periodically in recognition of contributions to the betterment of community life throughout Canada. In recognition primarily for his work with the Foundation, he received an appointment to the Order of Canada, with the official presentation taking place on October 21, 1992, in Ottawa.

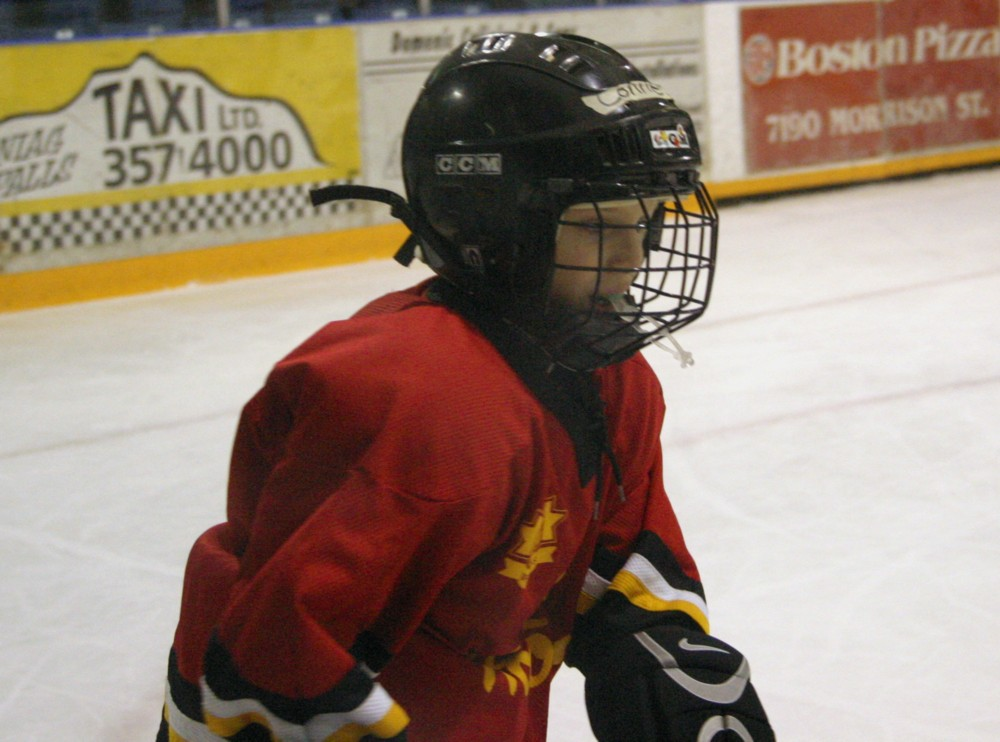
A Timbits hockey player. The company sponsors an ice hockey minor sports program in Canada.

Tim Hortons became a sponsor of Hockey Canada in December 2019, including the presenting sponsor of the Centennial Cup, the national junior "A" ice hockey championship and one of the major sponsors of Canada's national ice hockey teams.

== Controversies ==
=== Ontario minimum wage ===
Tim Hortons became the subject of controversy after the raise of the minimum wage in Ontario from $11.60 to $14.00 an hour which was made effective January 2018. The minimum wage increase was strongly criticized by the Ontario Chamber of Commerce, Restaurants Canada, and the Canadian Franchise Association. Restaurant Brands International did not help franchisees offset the wage hike, refusing to reduce the supply costs that it charged Tim Hortons franchisees, nor did it permit franchisees to raise menu prices in order to offset the wage hikes (in contrast to McDonald's, Cara Foods and Starbucks who did allow menu price increases in Ontario to cope with the wage increases). Tim Hortons franchisees, many of them small business owners who employed an average of 35 staff (the wage hike would cost the franchisee $7,000 per employee a year), responded by cutting employee benefits such as paid breaks and contributions to health plans. In one case, owners posted a memo encouraging employees to contact the Ontario Premier, Kathleen Wynne, and indicate that they "will not vote Liberal in the coming Ontario election in June 2018." Wynne responded by saying "I'm happy to talk to any business owner about the minimum wage but taking it out on employees is not fair and not acceptable." Around 50 demonstrations were held across Canada, including 38 in Ontario, in response to the benefit cuts. The minimum wage controversy hurt the chain's reputation; usually placing in the top 10 of the Leger research poll for the top 10 companies or brands in Canada, Tim Hortons dropped from 4th place in 2017 to 50th in 2018.

The Great White North Franchisee Association, formed in 2017, represented Tim Hortons franchises involved in a series of ongoing disputes with the head office of Tim Hortons due to frustrations with Restaurant Brands International (the parent company of Tim Hortons and Burger King). GWNFA has filed class-action lawsuits against the Restaurant Brands International over the handling of the Ontario minimum wage hike, inflated head office pricing, and misuse of their advertising funds.

=== Plastics pollution ===
Named as one of the top five plastic polluters in Canada in 2018 and 2019; in 2019, Tim Hortons accounted for about 11% of branded plastic waste collected by Greenpeace Canada from rivers and beaches.

In late 2018 and early 2019, Tim Hortons was subject to controversy over their usage of plastic cups. An online Change.org petition asking the company to switch from plastic cups to "a fully recyclable and compostable alternative" gained over 171,000 signatures. The cups were not compostable, due to their plastic lining, and are often very difficult to recycle. As of February 2019, Tim Hortons had not responded to the petition's requests.

In some BC communities, recycling services accept Tim Hortons coffee cups. The City of Toronto announced in 2024 that it is piloting recycling coffee cups.

In early 2020, it gave away reusable cups for its "Roll Up the Rim to Win" promotion to eliminate single-use plastic in its establishments. The effort was criticized as greenwashing through a limited-time promotion.

=== Sick-leave during COVID-19 pandemic ===
In March 2020, Tim Hortons met criticism for not offering sick-leave concessions to employees during the COVID-19 pandemic in Canada.

=== App privacy violation ===
On June 1, 2022, the federal privacy commissioner, with officials in Quebec, British Columbia and Alberta, announced the results of its investigation, that Tim Hortons violated privacy laws by tracking people who used its app, gathering their location data hundreds of times a day – even when the app was not in use. As way of restitution, Tim Hortons offered eligible app users a free coffee and a baked good.

According to a CBC investigation, the Tim Hortons app transmits user data to an overseas third party, though the broadcaster did not disclose the company's identity or location. After that, CJPME released a statement. The group said it had confirmed the company's identity through researchers at the University of Calgary. The company is an Israeli cybersecurity firm known as Forter.

=== Usage of temporary foreign workers ===
Following the COVID-19 pandemic, Tim Hortons utilized the temporary foreign worker program (TFW) to fill employee vacancies. In December 2025, CBC News reported that the company had lobbied federal politicians to expand the program. In May 2026, Tim Hortons announced that it would seek to "hire local" and reduce its usage of the program, stating that 4,000 of its employees were hired through the TFW program as of 2026.

=== Reaction to Harry Potter partnership ===
In August 2026, Tim Horton announced its "Back to Hogwarts with Harry Potter" campaign, with a series of themed products released to mark the 25th anniversary of the release of the first film of the Harry Potter movie franchise. The campaign received criticism from the 2SLGBTQ+ community, with Tim Horton being rebranded by online activists as "TERF-Hortons" for being perceived to be aligning themselves with J.K. Rowling's "anti-trans" views. Advocacy group Egale Canada argued that "as a brand that is synonymous with Canada, Tim Hortons and their partnerships should reflect Canada — a country that is inclusive and proud of its diversity".

== See also ==
- List of Canadian restaurant chains
- List of coffeehouse chains
- List of doughnut shops
- Coffee wars
- History of Burger King
