= Bess Eaton =

Coffee shop chain in the United States

Bess Eaton Management LLC
- Industry: Coffee shops
- Predecessor: Bess Eaton Donut Flour Company Incorporated
- Founded: 1953, reopened in 2011
- Founder: Angelo (Bangy) Gencarelli Jr. (1953), David Ligouri (2011)
- Number of locations: 1 (2026)
- Area served: Rhode Island
- Products: coffee, pastries, baked goods
- Owner: David Liguori
- Website: www.besseaton.com

Bess Eaton or Bess Eaton Management LLC is a small chain of coffee shops based in Rhode Island and Connecticut, serving doughnuts, bagels, and muffins. It started in 1953 sigrew to over 50 shops throughout southern New England. It was sold to other chains following bankruptcy in 2004. The chain reopened in 2011 under new ownership. As of 2026, there is one location in Westerly, Rhode Island.

== History ==
The Bess Eaton Donut Flour Company was founded in 1953 by Angelo (Bangy) Gencarelli Jr. and was known for its coffee and hand-cut donuts. The corporate headquarters were located in Westerly, Rhode Island, with up to 56 retail shops spread between Rhode Island, Massachusetts, and Connecticut. At one time, it was Rhode Island's seventh largest private employer of 750 workers and 650 workers at the chain's sale. Throughout the chain's 50-year history, the company was privately held by the Gencarelli family. In the last year of operations, the firm was focusing on wholesale business and non-store locations to boost profits, but ultimately was sold to Tim Hortons of Canada. Leading up to the company's sale, then CEO, Louis A. Gencarelli, Sr., made headlines printing Biblical scripture verses on the company's cups and product packaging.

=== 2004 closing ===
In its last decade of operation, the Bess Eaton Donut Flour Company faced many internal difficulties, including claims from its own management of financial improprieties. The firm sold its retail division in mid-2004 following bankruptcy litigation. With a reported $35 million bid, the fast-food chain Wendy's International Corporation prevailed over the Dunkin' Donuts chain in their competition to purchase the 48 defunct Bess Eaton stores and other assets. Within two months of acquisition, Wendy's had converted 42 of those stores to their Tim Hortons brand. In conjunction with the sale, Bess Eaton closed its production facility and corporate headquarters. Wendy's sold Tim Hortons in 2006, but kept ownership of the Bess Eaton trademark.

=== 2011 reopening ===
From 2008 to 2010, Tim Hortons closed the doors on all shops in Southern New England, including all of the Bess Eaton shops it had acquired. In late January 2011, David Liguori registered a limited liability company under the name Bess Eaton Management LLC with the Rhode Island Secretary of State's Office. He also acquired the Bess Eaton trademark under his company name, according to the U.S. Patent and Trademark Office, and acquired the leases of several of the closed Tim Hortons. In 2024, the Bess Eaton in Wakefield, Rhode Island closed, followed by the location in Pawcatuck, Connecticut in 2026. The final remaining store is in Westerly, Rhode Island.

=== Original management ===
- Louis A. Gencarelli Sr. - CEO 1982–2002; 2003–2004
- George Cioe - CEO 2002–2003
- Angelo Gencarelli Jr. - CEO and founder 1953–1982
- Paul Gencarelli - CFO and son of Louis Gencarelli Sr.
