= Cees van Riel =

Dutch organizational theorist

Cornelis Bernardus Maria (Cees) van Riel (born 15 June 1951) is a Dutch organizational theorist, consultant, and Professor of Corporate Communication at Rotterdam School of Management and Director of the Corporate Communication Centre at the Erasmus University, known for his work in the area of corporate communication and reputation management.

== Biography ==
Born in Tilburg and raised in Eindhoven, Van Riel studied Mass Communication at the Radboud University Nijmegen from 1973 to 1973, receiving his BA in Political Science, another BA in Economic History and his MA in Mass Communication. In 1986 he obtained his PhD in communication at Erasmus University Rotterdam for the doctoral dissertation entitled "Overheidsvoorlichting en Intermediaire kaders" (Government Information and Intermediary Staff).

In November 1993 Van Riel was appointed Professor of Corporate Communication at Rotterdam School of Management. He is also Director of the Corporate Communication Centre and Vice Chairman of the Reputation Institute. He was founding father of the Master of Science in Corporate Communication (MSc degree programme) at Rotterdam School of Management, Erasmus University. This was the first programme of its kind, offered at a university level (Master Degree), in the world.

Van Riel has worked as a communication strategy consultant for a variety of companies in Europe. He is also the editor-in-chief together with Charles Fombrun of the Corporate Reputation Review.

Van Riel received several awards. The article "The Impact of Employee Communication and Perceived External Prestige on Organizational Identification" with co-authors Ale Smidts and Ad Th.H. Pruyn won the ERIM Top Article Award 2002. His 2003 books Fame & Fortune authored with Charles Fombrun received the Erasmus Research Institute of Management (ERIM) Impact on Management Practice Award 2006. In 2011 Van Riel received the 2011 Pathfinder Award, the highest academic honor bestowed by the Institute for Public Relations (IPR) for his contribution to research in the field of corporate reputation and strategic alignment.

== Work ==
From his academic research and studies, the most applied models are: RepTrak Model and RepTrak Alignment Monitor.

=== RepTrak model ===
The RepTrak Model is a tool that tracks 23 key performance indicators grouped around 7 reputation dimensions that research has proven to be effective in getting stakeholders to support the company. The beating heart of the RepTrak Model is the Pulse. The RepTrak Pulse measures the health of a company's overall reputation with consumers. The RepTrak Pulse score is based on four statements: the esteem, good feeling, trust, and admiration that consumers feel towards a company. The results of this study are published world-wide through Forbes.com as well as through local partners in the 27 countries included in the study.

=== Reputation Institute ===
Van Riel co-founded the Reputation Institute in 1997. This Institute has functioned as a private research and consulting organisation. Its mission is to advance knowledge about corporate reputation and help companies create economic value by implementing coherent reputing strategies.

== Publications ==
Cees van Riel published several books and articles about corporate communication. Books, a selection:

- Van Riel, Cees BM, Principles of Corporate Communication. Prentice Hall, 1992.
- Van Riel, Cees BM, Identiteit en Imago, 1992.
- Fombrun, Charles J., and Cees BM Van Riel. Fame & fortune: How successful companies build winning reputations. FT Press, 2004.
- Van Riel, Cees BM, and Charles J. Fombrun. Essentials of corporate communication: Implementing practices for effective reputation management. Routledge, 2007.

Articles, a selection:

- Fombrun, Charles, and Cees Van Riel. "The reputational landscape." Corporate reputation review (1997): 1-16.
- van Riel, Cees BM, and John MT Balmer. "Corporate identity: the concept, its measurement and management." European journal of marketing 31.5/6 (1997): 340–355.
- Jo Hatch, Mary, C.B.M. van Riel, and Majken Schultz. "Relations between organizational culture, identity and image." European Journal of marketing 31.5/6 (1997): 356–365.
- Smidts, Ale, Ad Th H. Pruyn, and Cees BM Van Riel. "The impact of employee communication and perceived external prestige on organizational identification." Academy of Management journal 44.5 (2001): 1051–1062.
