= Ale Smidts =

Dutch organizational theorist

Ale Smidts (born 1958) is a Dutch organizational theorist, and Professor of Marketing Research at the Rotterdam School of Management, Erasmus University (RSM). known for his work on organizational identification, and neuromarketing.

== Life and work ==
Smidts grew up in Leeuwarden, where he attended the Lienward College. He obtained his MS at the Wageningen University and Research Centre in 1982, and in 1986 his PhD.

After his graduation Smidts started his academic career at the Wageningen University. In 1997 he was appointed Professor of Marketing Research at the Rotterdam School of Management, where he also chairs the Department of Marketing Management. From 2004 to 2011 he was also Scientific Director of the Erasmus Research Institute of Management (ERIM). Since 2005 he also is Director of the Erasmus Center for Neuroeconomics.

His research interests are in the fields of neuroscience, neuroeconomics and particularly neuromarketing.

== Selected publications ==
- Pruyn, Ad, and Ale Smidts. "Effects of waiting on the satisfaction with the service: Beyond objective time measures." International Journal of Research in Marketing 15.4 (1998): 321–334.
- Pennings, Joost ME, and Ale Smidts. "Assessing the construct validity of risk attitude." Management Science 46.10 (2000): 1337–1348.
- Smidts, Ale, Ad Th H. Pruyn, and Cees B.M. Van Riel. "The impact of employee communication and perceived external prestige on organizational identification." Academy of Management journal 44.5 (2001): 1051–1062.
- Leenheer, J., Van Heerde, H. J., Bijmolt, T. H., & Smidts, A. (2007). "Do loyalty programs really enhance behavioral loyalty? An empirical analysis accounting for self-selecting members." International Journal of Research in Marketing, 24(1), 31–47.
- Klucharev, V., Hytönen, K., Rijpkema, M., Smidts, A., & Fernández, G. (2009). "Reinforcement learning signal predicts social conformity." Neuron, 61(1), 140–151.
