= RepTrak =

Research and insights company, Boston

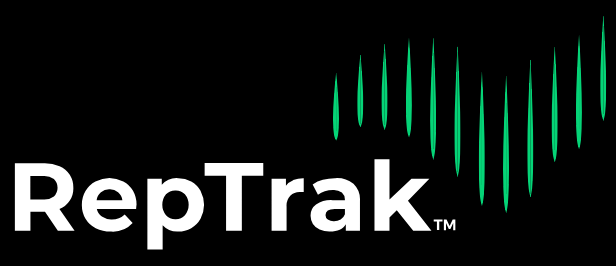
- Formerly: Reputation Institute
- Founded: 1999
- Founder: Charles Fombrun; Cees van Riel
- Headquarters: Boston, Massachusetts, U.S.
- Key people: Mark Sonders(CEO)
- Website: reptrak.com

RepTrak (formerly known as Reputation Institute) is a company that publishes reports on the reputation of corporations and places, based on consumer surveys and media coverage. It is headquartered in Boston, Massachusetts.

== History ==
In 1999, Charles Fombrun, a professor at New York University Stern School of Business, and Cees van Riel, a professor at Rotterdam School of Management, founded Reputation Institute.

In early 2020, the company changed its name to RepTrak.

In early 2023, Mark Sonders became the CEO.

== Reputation ratings ==
In collaboration with Harris Interactive, Reputation Institute developed Reputation Quotient (RQ) in 1999. In 2005, Reputation Institute developed the RepTrak model to replace RQ. As of 2016, RepTrak studies are conducted annually. RepTrak analyzes corporate reputation using measures in seven dimensions: "products and services," "innovation," "workplace," "governance," "citizenship," "leadership," and "performance." The company also publishes Country RepTrak which ranks the reputations of nations using three criteria: "appealing environment," "advanced economy," and "effective government."
