= Johan H. Andresen Jr. =

Norwegian industrialist and investor

Johan Henrik Andresen
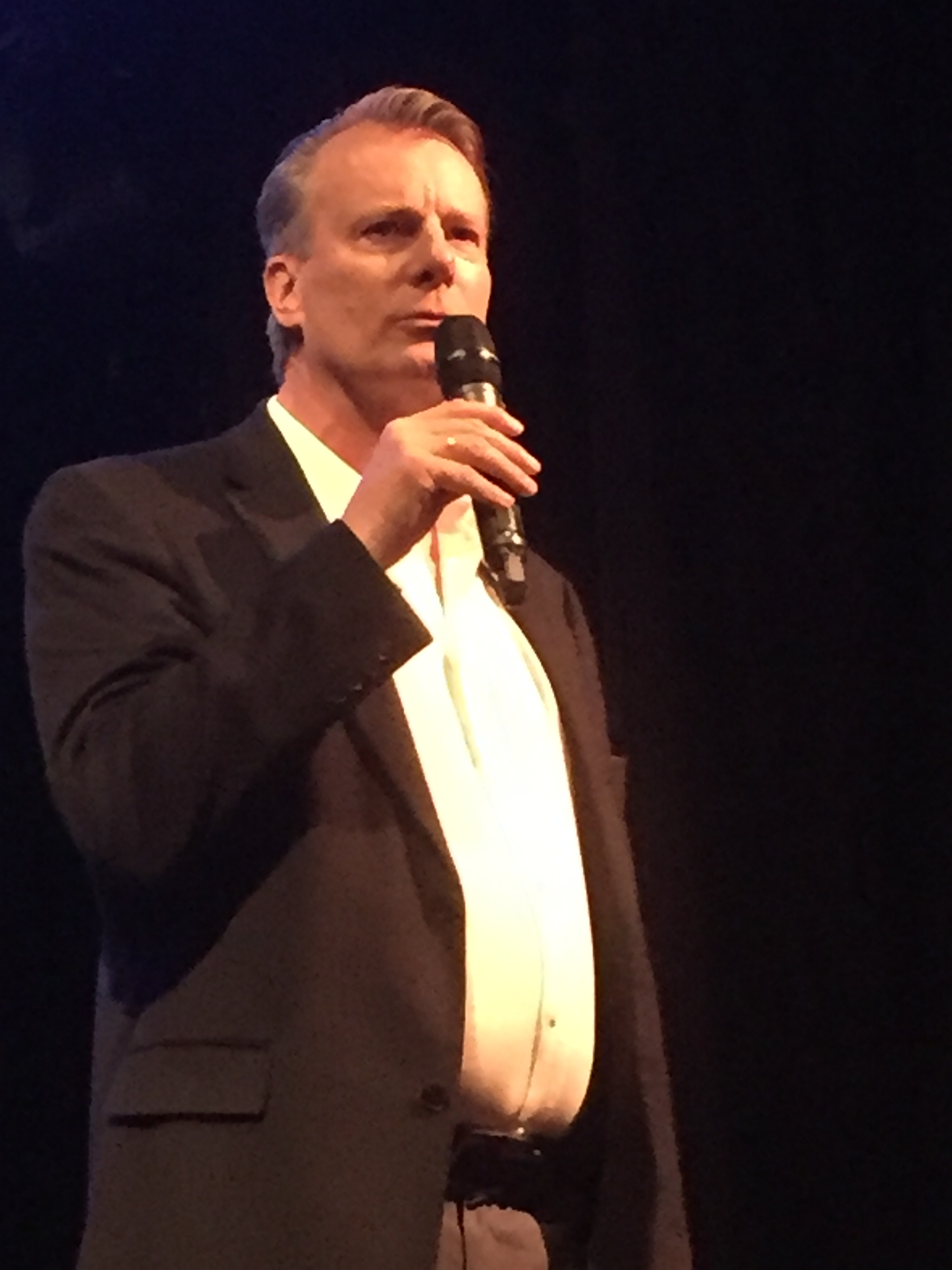
- Andresen in March, 2017
- Born: 25 July 1961 (age 64); Oslo, Norway
- Education: Dartmouth College (BA); Rotterdam School of Management (MBA)
- Occupations: Chairman of Ferd AS (2012–); CEO of Ferd AS (1998–2012)
- Known for: Ferd AS
- Children: Katharina and Alexandra

Johan Henrik Andresen (born 25 July 1961) is a Norwegian industrialist and investor. Since 1998, Andresen has been the owner of Ferd, one of the largest privately held companies in Norway. He served in the position of chief executive from 1998 to 2012, and has been the chairman of the board since 2012. In the magazine Kapital’s list of the 400 richest Norwegians, Andresen is ranked as number five, with a net worth equalling more than US$3.27 billion. While his father Johan H. Andresen Sr. lived, Andresen added 'Jr.' to his name, but ended this practice when his father died in 2011.

== Early life ==
Andresen was born on 25 July 1961 in Oslo, as the son of industrialist Johan Henrik Andresen (1930–2011) and Swedish noblewoman Marianne Ebba Therese Bielke. He received a Bachelor of Arts degree in Government and Policy Studies from Dartmouth College in 1988, and an MBA in 1993 from the Rotterdam School of Management.

== Career ==
Andresen was product manager in International Paper Co., US from 1989 to 1991. In 1993 he became a partner in the Norwegian industrial group Tiedemanns-gruppen. He succeeded his father as the sole owner and CEO in 1998, and thus became the fifth generation of the Andresen family in charge of the company since the first Johan H. Andresen bought the tobacco company J.L. Tiedemanns Tobaksfabrik in 1849. In 1998 the tobacco production of Tiedemanns Tobaksfabrik was merged with the Scandinavian Tobacco Company, and in 2005 Andresen sold all his shares in the company for 3.3 billion kr.

Tiedemanns-gruppen changed its name to Ferd in 2001. Today, Ferd owns Elopak, Aibel (50%), TeleComputing, Interwell and Swix Sport, among other companies, in addition to substantial portfolios of stock, hedge fund investments, private equity and property. The company’s net asset value has grown from 7.4 billion kr in 2003 to 24.3 kr billion as of year’s end 2013.

In September 2006, Andresen famously attempted to acquire the Swiss packaging and former weapons producer SIG, by placing a bid of 11 billion kr for 50.01% of the shares in the company. Andresen's plan was to merge SIG with Ferd-owned Elopak, making it the world's second largest packaging manufacturer. SIG, however, initiated a bidding war, and in March 2007 Ferd announced that it would no longer be pursuing the transaction. This would have been one of the largest acquisitions in Norwegian history.

Andresen chairs the Council on Ethics for the Government Pension Fund Global. He is Chairman of the Board of Ferd AS, and serves as a board member of Skandinaviska Enskilda Banken AB (SEB) in Sweden, NMI – Norwegian Microfinance Initiative, Junior Achievement –Young Enterprise, Europe, and Junior Achievement –Young Enterprise, Norway (Ungt Entreprenørskap).

== Philanthropy ==
In 2006, Andersen initiated a collaborative project between public and private interests. This led to the launching of NMI – Norwegian Microfinance Initiative in 2008, a microfinance institution aimed at stimulating growth in impoverished countries. In 2009 he formed Ferd Social Entrepreneurs, a separate non-commercial business area within Ferd that supports selected organizations, projects and individuals in activities where the social results carry greater weight than the financial results.

== Personal life ==
Andresen is the grandson of Johan H. Andresen, and the great-grandson of Johan Henrik Andresen. He is married to Kristin Gamlemshaug. The couple has two daughters, Katharina and Alexandra.

In 2007, Andresen transferred most of the Ferd Holding shares, with an estimated value of 12 billion kr, to his daughters.
