= Jolly Roger (disambiguation) =

A Jolly Roger is a flag flown by pirate ships to signify an attack.

Jolly Roger may also refer to:

== People ==
- Jolly Roger, banjo player credited on the soundtrack of Pat Garrett & Billy the Kid
- Jolly Roger, a nickname for former Dallas Cowboys quarterback Roger Staubach

== Arts, entertainment, and media ==
=== Fictitious characters ===
- Jolly Roger (frog), a minor character in the Banjo-Kazooie video game series
- Jolly Roger (Pirates of the Caribbean), a primary villain of the Disney MMO Pirates of the Caribbean Online
- Jolly Roger, secondary character in the animated cartoon television series I Am Weasel
- Jolly Roger, a character in Grant Morrison's comic book series The Invisibles

=== Fictitious vessels ===
- Jolly Roger, fictional ship of the pirate Captain Hook
- Jolly Roger, formerly the name of Shanghai Sam's vessel in the Bugs Bunny cartoon "Mutiny on the Bunny", now called the Sad Sack
- Jolly Roger, a Sunracer-class scoutship from the computer game Space Rogue

=== Other uses in arts, entertainment, and media ===
- Jolly Roger Records, an American record label
- "The Jolly Roger" (Once Upon a Time), a television episode
- Jolly Roger Bay, a stage in Super Mario 64
- Jolly Roger, a comic opera by Walter Leigh

== Military ==
- Use of the Jolly Roger by submarines
- Jolly Rogers, a nickname for United States Navy Fighter Squadrons, including:
  - VF-17 Jolly Rogers
  - VF-61
  - VF-84
  - VFA-103
- USS Jolly Roger (SP-1031), a United States Navy patrol vessel in commission from December 1917 or early 1918 to November 1918

== Sports ==
- Jolly Roger (horse), steeplechase racehorse
- "The Jolly Rogers", the factory-sponsored ski and snowboard team for Hertel Wax

== Other uses ==
- Jolly Roger Amusement Park, Ocean City, Maryland, United States
- Jolly Roger Restaurant, an establishment at various locations, such as Lake City, Seattle and Nunley's Happyland in Bethpage, New York, United States
- Jolly Roger's Amusement Park, or Nunley's Happyland, Bethpage, New York, United States
