= Christiania Staalværk =

Former Norwegian steelworks in Oslo

- Formerly: Christiania Ferro Chrom Compagnie
- Type: Aksjeselskap
- Industry: Steel
- Founded: 1895
- Defunct: 1920
- Fate: Bankruptcy
- Headquarters: Kampen, Oslo, Norway
- Key people: Hans Peter Fyhn Krag, Harald Jensen
- Products: Steel, projectiles, cannons, harpoon grenades

Christiania Staalværk was an industrial company at Kampen in Oslo, founded in 1895 and greatly expanded from 1901.

During the First World War (1914–1918), the works was taken over by a consortium that planned large expansions to meet the need to make Norway more self-sufficient in steel. Extensive investments were made in new production halls at Ensjø in the expectation of strong state support for the steel cause. After the war ended in 1918, changed economic and political conditions led to the project being halted. In 1920 the steelworks went bankrupt, and the whole plan stood as a typical speculative venture of the boom years. The works buildings were sold and put to new uses: the production hall at Kampen was taken over by the sports club Kampørn, while the halls at Ensjø were used by, among others, the Armed Forces supply command and the car firm Kolberg, Caspary & Co.

== Background ==
The forerunner of Christiania Staalværk began around 1880, when the engineer Christian Olsen at Eidsfos Jernverk, which he later came to own, experimented his way to a method that produced 65 percent chromium from chromium iron ore. He wanted to market this as "ferro-chrome" and gathered investors in 1885 to establish the company Christiania Ferro Chrom Compagnie. The company began producing chromium steel in a factory by the Kampen water basin in 1891 and, besides supplying the Norwegian market, exported to Sweden and Switzerland, among other places.

== Establishment of the steelworks ==
When chromium prices fell, Christiania Ferro Chrom Compagnie was sold and reorganized several times before it was taken over in 1893 by the wholesaler and investor Hans Peter Fyhn Krag (1859–1925). He re-established the company as Christiania Staalverk from 1895, with ambitions to invest in steel production, and obtained new premises in Bøgata at Kampen, where a small gas-fired crucible steel works was built.

From 1901 two larger factory buildings were erected on a neighboring site at Normannsløkka to the east. In cooperation with the German industrial company Rheinische Metallwaaren- und Maschinenfabrik, this was equipped with a larger open-hearth steelworks, which came into operation in 1903 with an annual capacity of 7,000 tonnes. The works gave employment to 100 men and could at times employ up to 200. The company secured several favorable contracts with the armed forces for the production of projectiles and shells, among other things, and also made cannons and harpoon grenades for the rapidly expanding whaling fleet.

== First World War and the steel venture ==
During the First World War it became difficult to import steel to Norway from Britain and Germany, so a manifold increase in the country's own steel production became relevant, supported by an active state policy that many see as the start of the "ironworks question." In 1916 the state took the initiative to stimulate the steel industry and planned to raise total domestic production from 16,000 to 65,000 tonnes. The plan was for Christiania Spigerverk to supply 12,000 tonnes, and Raufoss, Hamar Jernstøperi, and Strømmen Staal were also involved in the project.

== Major new steelworks venture ==
In 1916 Christiania Staalverk was taken over by a consortium led by Harald Jensen, who owned Myrens Verksted. With him were, among others, the power-station and industrial developer engineer Harald Boe, the Hjula heir Halvor John Schou, and Thorleif Paus, son of the steel wholesaler Ole Paus. They signed on to the state initiative for increased steel self-sufficiency with plans to expand at Kampen and to establish a new gigantic factory hall at Gladengen in Ensjø, east of the Kampen factory. There were several brickworks in the area, including Lilleberg Teglverk, which the steelworks bought up.

In 1918 a building application was submitted for a modern industrial building of over 10,000 square meters. Four main halls were designed with arched roofs without supporting columns, so that they were large and flexible, intended to house a steelworks based on both pig iron and scrap iron, as well as rolling mills for both bars and plates. A dedicated power station at Bingsfoss in the Glomma was also planned to supply electricity for the melting, in what was described as an "electric blast furnace" for pig-iron smelting. This plan required much development and was abandoned in favor of using peat fuel, an investment Myrens had made, as the energy source for melting scrap steel and rolling it into plates.

The plan would cost up to 30 million kroner, half of which was to be raised as private share capital. In addition, in 1917 a production subsidy and a state-guaranteed loan of 12 million kroner were sought through the newly created Ministry of Industrial Supply. Half the amount was guaranteed, and a support of 6 kroner per tonne of rolled steel produced was also promised, the ambition being an annual production of 50,000 tonnes. These state guarantees, far lower than assumed, came only in 1919, however, when construction was already under way, and the investor group and Myrens Verksted took on costly bridge financing through new bank loans.

== Bankruptcy ==
The steelworks planned to complete its new factory at Ensjø by the end of 1918, a timeframe that proved unrealistic. In the middle of construction the First World War ended, and economic conditions became even more unstable. With the state guarantees failing to materialize and costly bank loans, the project ran into great financial difficulties. This stirred engagement in some political circles, where some held that the factory halls at Ensjø should be carried on as a steelworks, while in other political circles there was great doubt about whether the state should support a new company like Christiania Staalverk, some holding it better to back the established and expanding Spigerverk and other existing companies such as Strømmen Staal, which were also in turbulent times now that the war was over.

No solution to the financial problems was found, and Christiania Staalverk finally went bankrupt in 1920. In February 1921 the properties were put up for sale, including the old steel plant with open-hearth furnaces at Kampen, the new factory halls at Ensjø, and Lilleberg Teglverk and Normannsløkka. Even with realizable assets, the investors were hard hit: Halvor John Schou was declared personally bankrupt, and Harald Jensen had to enter private composition negotiations. The family company he led, Myrens, was also left with high debt that probably contributed to its having to write down its share capital several times during the 1920s, and it was finally taken over by its arch-competitor Kværner Brug in 1928.

== Later use ==
The industrial building at Kampen was taken over by the sports club Kampørn, which converted it into Oslo's largest sports hall, Sportshallen, where boxing and wrestling were practiced and concerts and political meetings were also held. In 1939 the sports hall was demolished to make way for housing and a park, and the smallest hall at Kampen was used by the car firm Kolberg & Caspari for storage and car assembly.

After the site at Kampen was rezoned for housing, Kolberg was offered the use of the large steelworks halls in Gladengveien. Under the name Kampen lagerhaller, Kolberg became one of the firms that contributed to the establishment of the car trade in the area, with many different firms and brands in what came to be called the "car town at Ensjø." The halls also housed other smaller businesses in the 1950s, including a metalware factory. After 2000, Ensjø was rezoned from "car town" and industrial use to housing and built up with large residential complexes in an area that included the former Tiedemanns tobacco factory and surrounding industrial buildings. The five steelworks halls were, after some discussion of alternative uses as sports halls, art spaces, and local cultural venues, decided to be demolished, the first two in 2008 and the last three in 2022. What remains is housing and a park, and street names such as Stålverksveien, Stålverkskroken, and Stålverksparken.

== Bibliography ==
- Knudsen, Sverre (1990). Noen merknader til relasjonene stat-bank-bedrift under jobbetiden 1914–20.
