= Bentley Oil Field =

Oil field in the UK sector of the North Sea

- Location within North Sea
- Country: United Kingdom
- Location: North Sea
- Block: 9/3b
- Offshore/onshore: Offshore
- Coordinates: 59°56′N 1°34′E
- Owner: Xcite Energy
- Service contractors: AMEC, Aibel, ARUP, Baker Hughes, BP, COSL, Teekay

Field history
- Discovery: 1977
- Start of development: 2016 (est)
- Start of production: 2019 (est)
- Peak year: 2025 (est)
- Abandonment: 2069 (est)

Production
- Estimated oil in place: 880.9 million barrels (~1.202×10^{8} t)
- Recoverable oil: 267.3 million barrels (~3.647×10^{7} t)
- Estimated gas in place: 13.1×10^{9} cu ft (370×10^{6} m^{3})
- Recoverable gas: 35.9×10^{9} cu ft (1.02×10^{9} m^{3})
- Producing formations: Dornoch formation (Late Paleocene)

The Bentley Oil Field is a heavy oil field located on the East Shetland Platform in the UK Northern North Sea, 8 kilometres (5.0 mi) southeast of the Bressay Field (operator: Statoil), 15 kilometres (9.3 mi) east of the Kraken Field (operator: EnQuest) and 20 kilometres (12 mi) north-northeast of the Bruce Field (operator: BP).

== History ==
The Bentley Field, located on the UK continental shelf in block 9/3b in 110 m of water, contains approximately 900 million barrels (140 million cubic metres) in-place of heavy (10 to 12 oAPI) viscous (1500 cP) crude. The field is four-way dip closed at uppermost Palaeocene, lowermost Eocene, Dornoch sandstone level, and covers an area of about 16 km by 5 km at a depth of around 1.1 km TVDss. The reservoir is high porosity (33%), net to gross pay (90%) and with ultra-high apparent horizontal permeabilities approaching 50 Darcies based on flow-test measurements, but consistent with unconsolidated sand.

=== Appraisal History ===
The field was discovered in 1977 with the Amoco 9/3-1 vertical exploration well, which discovered an 81 ft oil column in high quality Dornoch sandstone. The field was subsequently licensed to Conoco who appraised it with two further vertical wells (9/3-2A and 9/3-4) in the 1980s. These confirmed the presence of a large accumulation, estimated at that time to be similar to today’s figure at around 900 MMstb in-place. Attempts to gas-lift the 9/3-1 well failed due to the viscous nature of the Bentley crude, whilst an attempt to flow 9/3-2A using a downhole pump failed due to mechanical reasons.

With two failed tests and an oil price below $20/bbl Conoco relinquished the license in the mid 1990s.

There was no further activity on the block until 2003 when Xcite applied for, and were awarded, a Promote License on the block during the UK 21st Licensing Round. This was the first licensing round in which Promote Licences had been awarded and represented an important initiative from the UK licensing authorities to encourage small and new-start companies to acquire and promote acreage. The license was converted to a Traditional License in 2005 prior to Xcite’s first appraisal well (9/03b-5) in 2008.

This well was a vertical appraisal well, drilled at the end of 2007 and successfully flow-tested in January 2008. This was followed two more wells drilled November 2010 (9/03b-6 and 9/03b-6Z) to identify reservoir structure and characterise reservoir properties. The resultant flow-test delivered a surface constrained, final stabilised rate of 2,900 stb/day.

In August 2012 a successful extended well test was performed to gather more data on the reservoir properties and water cut by using the jack-up Rowan Norway. In October 2012 after 60 days, Xcite Energy announced the successful conclusion of the extended well test, with the 9/3b-7 and 7Z wells successfully suspended for future use as production wells.

The Bentley crude oil produced during the extended well test was stored on a floating storage unit Scott Spirit, and was sold to BP as per the off take agreement.

== Reserves ==
The recoverable reserves are estimated at 267 million barrels (42.4×10^{6} m^{3}) of heavy oil (API 10-12) and total oil in place is in excess of 880 million barrels (140×10^{6} m^{3}).

== Development ==
Since 2013 Xcite Energy Resources has been working with and signed memorandums of understanding with a number of industry partners to do pre-FEED/assurance engineering prior to arranging financing. The industry partners include AMEC, ARUP, Teekay Shipping, AIBEL AS, Baker Hughes and China Oilfield Services Limited. The company has also signed a collaboration agreement with Statoil and Shell in May 2014 to make available and share field-specific technical and operational information for the evaluation of potential synergies and collaboration between the Bentley and Bressay Fields, and another collaboration agreement in October 2014 with EnQuest and Statoil in order to evaluate the potential utilisation of common gas import infrastructure between the Kraken, Bentley and Bressay fields.

In October 2015 the Bentley license was reviewed in order to ascertain the appropriate field determination boundary for agreement with the OGA and the boundary of the Bentley oil field has been accepted subject to formal FDP approval.

Xcite announced in February 2016 that they had successfully completed a technical review of the first phase of the Bentley field development with the Oil and Gas Authority to ensure that the plan meets the OGA's policy objectives of maximising the economic benefit to the UK of its oil and gas resources. At the same time the company announced that they anticipate submitting a field development plan to the OGA in 2016.

The Bentley field is planned with a phased development. The first phase development, with a 5-year drilling programme, and focused on the northern area of the field will be followed by a second phase, which will focus on the western and south areas of the Bentley field. As the Bentley development will be short of fuel gas for meeting its power generation and process heat requirements, the first phase development plans is to include a 10 km 6" pipeline from a tie-in to the Kraken field for fuel gas import.

Technical and engineering work streams are largely complete and it is expected that the field will commence operation approximately three years after FDP approval from the UK Government. FDP submission is currently pending commercial and funding discussions which are ongoing as of May 2016. The company announced in their 2015 third quarter results that technical and commercial due diligence on the Bentley field had been completed by a potential field development partner, but that they remained very actively engaged with a wide range of parties in order to maximise the opportunity to secure the required funding. Separately, that the company has committed a significant amount of time to a technical review of the Bentley field development concept with the United Kingdom Oil and Gas Authority.

In late May 2016 Xcite Energy announced that they had reached agreement on the principal commercial terms for the development funding of the first phase of the Bentley project, but that they require a partner to join the development group. Separately, the company is running a tender process to select an EPCIC contractor for the MOPU and FSO and to finalise a drilling rig contract.

== Liquidation ==
The company was due to repay 139.05 (USD m) of bonds which fell due for repayment on 30 June 2016. They announced on 16 June 2016 that they had requested an extension of bond maturity to 30 September 2016, which was granted at a bondholders meeting on 30 June 2016. The following day the three non-executive directors resigned and the chief operating officer, Stephen Kew, stepped down from the company to remain solely as a non-executive director. On the 27 September 2016 they announced that negotiations were being concluded between the principal bondholders and the company for a restructuring that would see the bondholders exchange 100% of the value of the outstanding bonds being exchanged for 98.5% of the enlarged share capital of the company. The company advised that should the shareholders not support the proposed restructuring the bondholder would likely pursue enforcement action against the company.

Private shareholders were vocal in their support to vote down any proposal, and on the 25 October 2016 the company announced that the bondholders were planning to instruct the Bond Trustee to petition the Court in the British Virgin Islands requesting the appointment of a liquidator to the company. As a consequence of this planned action the Directors of the company requested the immediate suspension of the trading on AIM of shares.

The petition to place the company into liquidation was heard by the Eastern Caribbean Supreme Court in the British Virgin Islands on 5 December 2016.

Licence P1078 was subsequently licensed to Whalsay Energy, who have sold it for $42 million to Enquest.
