= J. L. Tiedemanns Tobaksfabrik =

Former Norwegian tobacco manufacturer

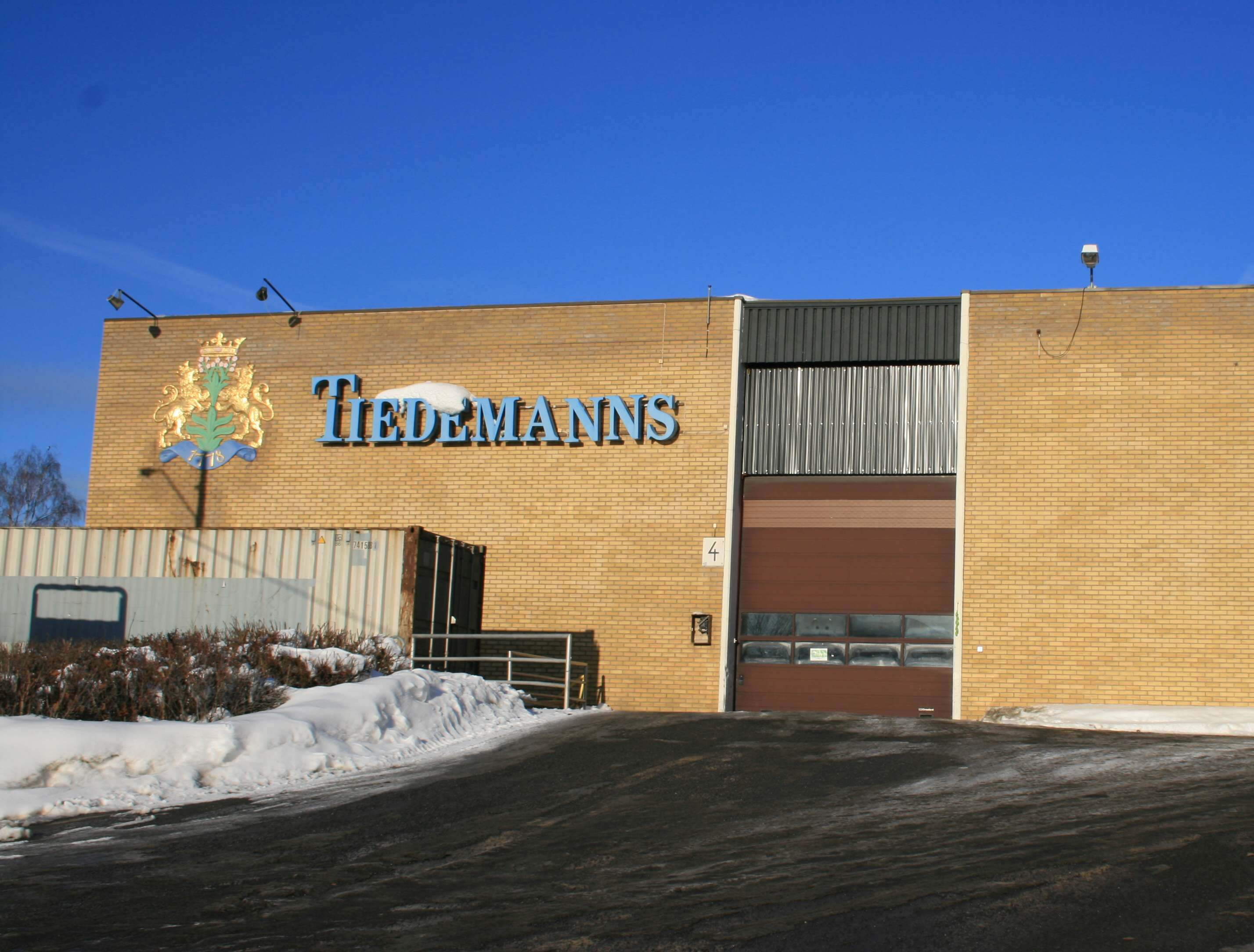
- Tiedemann's former factory in Hasle, Oslo
- Type: Aksjeselskap
- Industry: Tobacco
- Founded: 18th century
- Defunct: 2008
- Fate: Acquired by British American Tobacco; production moved to Denmark
- Headquarters: Oslo, Norway
- Key people: Johan Henrik Andresen
- Products: Cigarettes, pipe tobacco, snuff, cigars
- Number of employees: 38 (2026)

J. L. Tiedemanns Tobaksfabrik was a Norwegian tobacco manufacturer. The company produced tobacco in Oslo from the 18th century until 2008, when production was moved to Denmark and the company was sold to British American Tobacco (BAT).

The company changed hands many times over its history and took its name in 1833, when it was taken over by Johann Ludwig Tiedemann. In 1849 the factory was sold on to the wholesaler Johan Henrik Andresen (1815–1874), who also owned a number of other trading businesses, and the factory was owned by the Andresen family through several generations.

In 1998 the factory was merged with Skandinavisk Tobakskompani of Denmark. The owner at the time, Johan H. Andresen Jr., held a substantial number of other businesses and investments gathered under the Tiedemann name, including Swix, which from 2001 were part of the Ferd group. Andresen's stake in Skandinavisk Tobakskompani was sold in 2005.

== History ==
=== Beginnings ===
Tiedemann's tobacco factory has a natural place in the industrial history of Christiania and Oslo. Its roots reach back to the 18th century, and it was founded by the alderman Jens Jacobsen, who was granted the right to carry on merchant trade in the city as early as 1723. No exact founding date can be established, but newspapers and historical documents give an indication of when it was certainly part of the cityscape: a document from 1778 describes it as having existed 30 years earlier, while a fire assessment from 1763 gives detailed information about the factory building and its contents.

The use of tobacco had spread quickly in Europe from the 17th century, and was at first imported into Norway and the other Nordic countries from England and the Netherlands. Through the 18th century tobacco also began to be produced locally in Norway, and before long tobacco imports were regulated, with consumers compelled by ordinance to use locally produced tobacco rather than imported.

Tiedemann's tobacco factory was granted a royal privilege in 1778 for tobacco production and tobacco trade in Norway, meaning it could freely process and trade in tobacco at home and abroad, in town and country, and at markets and other places. The royal privilege also carried product protection, under which foreign processed tobacco was, with some exceptions, banned in Denmark and southern Norway, though not in northern Norway. The privilege must be seen in light of the economic policy of the Denmark-Norway dual monarchy, as part of an overall policy to make the nation economically self-sufficient and thereby also militarily strong. Other smaller tobacco factories later appeared around the country, and around 1850 tobacco was produced at about 25 smaller places, the industry employing some 800 people in all.

=== From craft to industry ===
Through the 1850s the tobacco factory changed character from a craft-based business to an industry with mechanical production. Production at Tiedemann's was extensive, and in 1850 the factory produced 31 different brands of smoking tobacco, 12 types of snuff, and 15 cigar brands. From the mid-19th century onward the factory was run as a more or less integrated part of Joh. A. Andresen's merchant and wholesale business, in which it played an important but subordinate role.

When Johan H. Andresen died in 1874, the extensive and many-sided business passed to his son Nicolai Andresen (1853–1923). Production was mostly profitable. A significant reorganization came in 1880: the company had long carried on extensive exports to Sweden, but tariff increases made these hard to maintain, so a tobacco factory was built in Charlottenberg in 1880, and up to the First World War this factory accounted for over 50 percent of total production. It proved profitable, and its output soon exceeded that of the factory in Kristiania, though the Norwegian factory also saw strong growth up to the First World War and accounted for a substantial part of the country's total tobacco production in this period.

In 1906 the factory used an automatic cigarette machine for the first time, ending the hand-rolling of cigarettes. At first the hand-rollers were more efficient than the machines: a skilled hand-roller could produce between 2,000 and 2,400 cigarettes a day, while the machines made only 1,800. Tiedemann's factories employed at most 16 hand-rollers. But the introduction of automation eventually lowered prices and raised production, and the hand-rollers gradually lost their jobs, the group reduced to a single person within a few years.

=== Expansion ===
In 1922 Tiedemann's tobacco factory bought Johannes N. Withs Tobakksfabrikker A/S, and the following year it took over W. Hartog & Co. These acquisitions brought a substantial increase in production, especially of cigarettes, but they were only the beginning of the factory's expansion, and further acquisitions of competitors followed: Norsk-Engelsk Tobakksfabrikk (NETO) in 1930, Carl E. Olsen & Co's Tobakksfabrikk in 1935, P. Pedersen & Søn in 1946, T. M. Nielsen & Søn in 1959, N.K.L's tobacco factory in 1960, Rose tobacco factory in 1971, and H. Petterøes tobacco factory in 1972. Through these acquisitions Tiedemann's tobacco factory gained a largely monopoly position in the field in Norway in the postwar period.

The expansion through the 1900s made the factory's original building in Falbes gate, which in time covered the whole block of Falbes gate, Stensberggata, and Sofies gate, too small. In the 1960s it was decided to build a new factory at Ensjø, in what had previously been an area of warehouse buildings for the company. The plant was built between 1968 and 1980 and housed administration, production, and storage.

=== Advertising ===
Tiedemann's had advertised its products almost from the time it started, and the scale of advertising grew as the range of products increased. Before long the advertising took on deeper significance. In 1914 the company launched the cigarette Teddy, with a drawing of Theodore (Teddy) Roosevelt on the pack. The launch was a symbolic act, to be seen in connection with Roosevelt's opposition to the American tobacco trust introduced some years earlier, which had led to a monopolization of the American tobacco market. The Teddy cigarette also became an example of the tobacco industry's long-term brand-building, in which each product had its own theme, logo, and slogan; Teddy was marketed under the slogan "Teddy, alle mands ven" ("Teddy, everyone's friend").

In the 1930s the factory used well-known women in advertising to break down stereotypes. Two of those used were Margarete Bonnevie, leader of the Norwegian Association for Women's Rights, and the writer Sigrid Undset. Smoking was recommended, among other things, to increase the desire to work.

=== Tobacco industry as a workplace ===
As a large industrial company, Tiedemann's tobacco factory was an important workplace in Christiania and Oslo over the years. A recurring feature was that the tobacco industry was an important workplace for women, and that female workers were relatively better paid than colleagues in other branches of industry.

Working conditions were nonetheless demanding, and it soon became known that the tobacco industry had conditions harmful to workers' health: there was poor ventilation in the factories, poor lighting, and physically demanding working positions, so many became ill from the work. Many children also worked in the industry, and surveys carried out in the 1870s showed that children made up about 45 percent of the workforce. It was assumed that by working in factories children learned discipline and order, trained their practical abilities, and improved their powers of observation, reflecting the attitude to leisure in the latter half of the 19th century, that life should consist of work.

The tobacco industry was subjected to especially strict provisions in the labor-protection legislation toward the end of the 19th century. The Act on Inspection of Work in Factories etc., passed in 1892, aimed to reduce the danger of work accidents, improve hygienic conditions, ensure that no one under 12 worked at the factories, and limit the work of children between 12 and 18. The tobacco workers were also early to establish trade unions, with the Female Tobacco Workers' Union and the Cigar-Makers' Union formed in the 1890s, probably out of a wish to assert themselves toward the employers.

In the postwar period, Tiedemann's tobacco factory became known for carrying out a job-design program intended to make the work tasks as interesting as possible. This was done by dividing the workforce into partly self-governing work teams of varying size, so that the individual gained greater influence over their own work situation, and as part of the program the company sought to increase workers' skills and pay so that the tobacco industry would not be seen as low-wage work.

=== The industry's health liability ===
As tobacco's harmful health effects became known, the tobacco manufacturers also had to answer for the harm caused by the products they made. In the late 20th and early 21st centuries there were therefore several court cases pointing to the consequences of tobacco use. People who began smoking before the 1975 ban on advertising and the requirement for warning labels sued Tiedemann's factories, claiming that the company had continued advertising its tobacco products even though it knew of their harmful effects. One of the cases reached the Supreme Court in the early 2000s, but the plaintiff, Robert Lund, lost.

== Bibliography ==
- Gierløff, Christian; Bull, Olaf; Thornam, Adolf (1928). Tobakkens Krønike. Oslo: Grøndahl.
- Gjernes, Marta (2019). «Jødiske arbeidarar i norsk sigarettindustri». Arbeiderhistorie, 125–145.
- NOU 2000:16. Tobakksindustriens erstatningsansvar. 1998.
- Ronge, Kari (2002). «Viktig dom for fremtidige røykesaker». Tidsskrift for Den norske legeforening, 20 March 2002.
- Schrumpf, Ellen (1991). «Arbeidervernloven – vern av arbeiderbevegelsens eller arbeiderfamiliens interesser?». Arbeiderhistorie, 99–115.
- Sejersted, Francis; Strømme Svendsen, Arnljot. Blader av tobakkens historie. J. L. Tiedemanns tobakkfabrikk 1778–1978. Oslo: Gyldendal.
