= Ski wax =

Material for use on snow runners

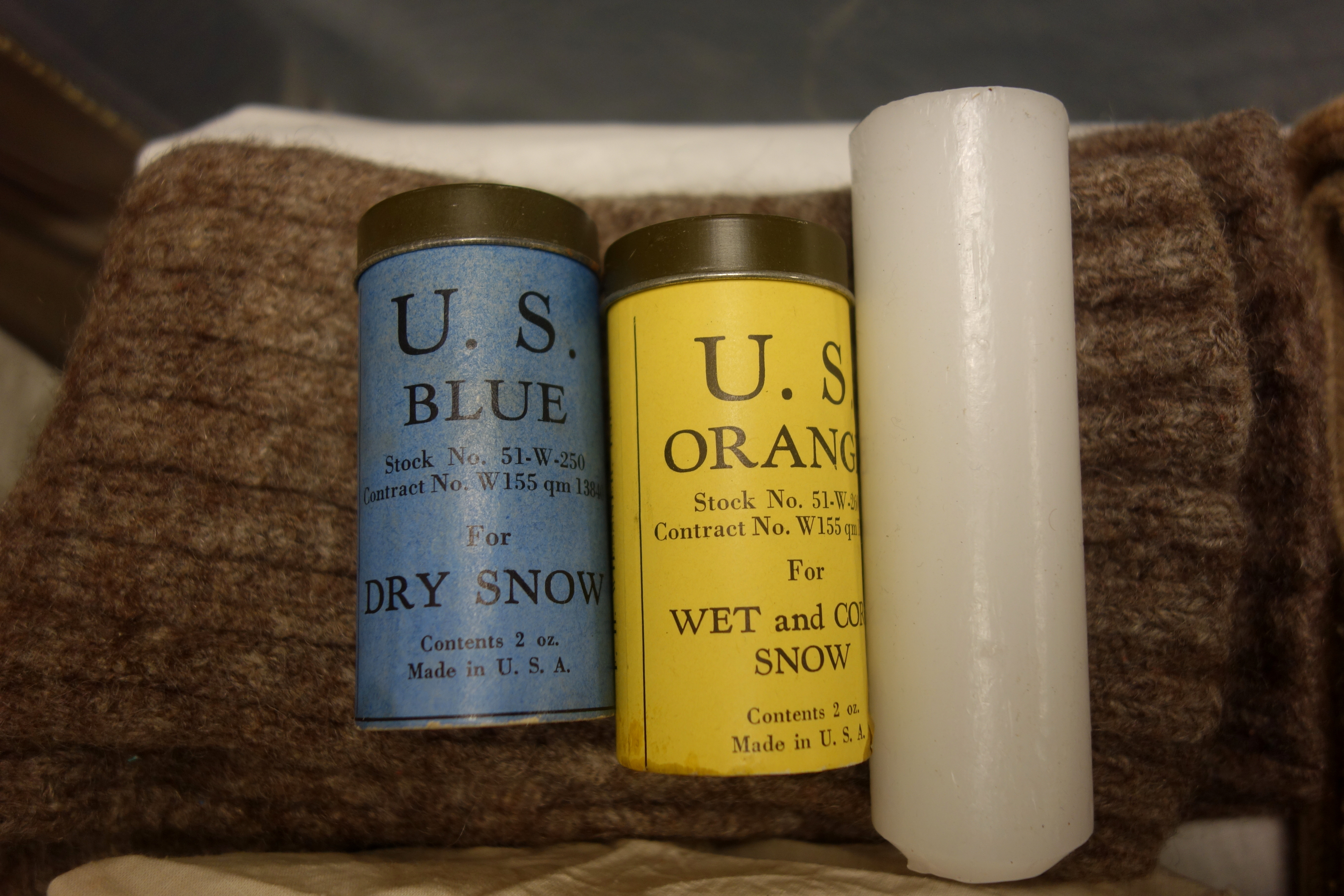
- Vintage ski waxes, once used by U.S. Army ski troops. Left to right are: grip waxes in canisters (blue for "dry snow" and yellow for "wet and corn snow") and a paraffin glide wax.
- Industrial sector(s): Winter sports equipment and supplies
- Main technologies or sub-processes: Tribology
- Feedstock: Paraffin wax, resins, fluorocarbons
- Product(s): Glide wax, grip wax
- Leading companies: Brav Group (Swix, Toko), Briko-Maplus, BeaverWax, Dakine, Dominator, Guru, Hertel Wax, Holmenkol, Oneball, Purl, Speedwax, Rex, Rode, Skigo, Startex, Vauthi,

Ski wax is a material applied to the bottom of snow runners, including skis, snowboards, and toboggans, to improve their coefficient of friction performance under varying snow conditions. The two main types of wax used on skis are glide waxes and grip waxes. They address kinetic friction—to be minimized with a glide wax—and static friction—to be achieved with a grip wax. Both types of wax are designed to be matched with the varying properties of snow, including crystal type and size, and moisture content of the snow surface, which vary with temperature and the temperature history of the snow. Glide wax is selected to minimize sliding friction for both alpine and cross-country skiing. Grip wax (also called "kick wax") provides on-snow traction for cross-country skiers, as they stride forward using classic technique.

Modern plastic materials (e.g. high-modulus polyethylene and Teflon), used on ski bases, have excellent gliding properties on snow, which in many circumstances diminish the added value of a glide wax. Likewise, unidirectional textures (e.g. fish scale or micro-scale hairs) underfoot on cross-country skis can offer a practical substitute for grip wax, particularly in wet or icy snow conditions.

== History ==
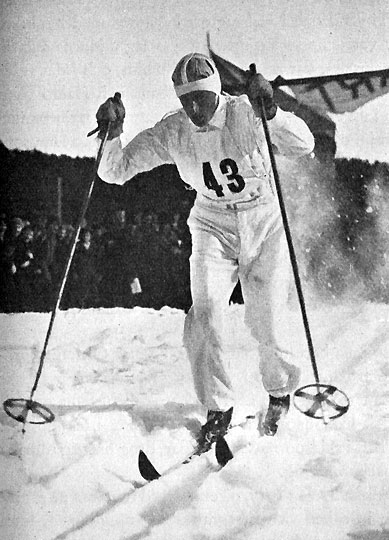
Swedish ski racer Martin Matsbo pioneered the development of modern cross-country ski waxes.

Johannes Scheffer in Argentoratensis Lapponiæ (History of Lapland) in 1673 gave what is probably the first recorded instruction for ski wax application He advised skiers to use pine tar pitch and rosin. Ski waxing was also documented in 1761. In 1733 the use of tar was described by Norwegian colonel Jens Henrik Emahusen. In the 1740s the Sami people’s use of resin and tallow under their skis is recorded in writing.

Beginning around 1854, California gold rush miners held organized downhill ski races. They also discovered that ski bases, smeared with lubricants brewed from vegetable and/or animal compounds, increased speed. This led to some of the first commercial ski lubricants, such as Black Dope and Sierra Lighting; both were mainly composed of sperm oil, vegetable oil and pine pitch. However, some instead used paraffin candle wax that melted onto ski bases, and these worked better under colder conditions.

Pine tar on wooden ski bases proved effective for using skis as transport over the centuries, because it fills the pores of the wood and creates a hydrophobic surface that minimizes suction from water in the snow, yet has sufficient roughness to allow traction for forward motion. In the 1920s and 30s, new varnishes were developed by European companies as season-long ski bases. A significant advance for cross country racing was the introduction of klister, for good traction in granular snow, especially in spring conditions; klister was invented and patented in 1913 by Peter Østbye. In the early 1940s Astra AB, a Swedish chemical company, advised by Olympic cross-country skier Martin Matsbo, started the development of petroleum-based waxes, using paraffin wax and other admixtures. By 1952, brands such as Toko, Swix, and Rex were providing an array of color-coded, temperature-tailored waxes.

Later in the 20th century, researchers addressed the issue of water and impurities adhering to skis during spring conditions. This was done through the novel use of a surfactant that interacted with the wax matrix to repel water effectively, an innovation first introduced in 1974 by Hertel Wax. Terry Hertel also developed the first fluorocarbon product and the first spring-time wax that repels and makes the running surface slick for spring time alpine ski and snowboard. This technology was introduced to the market in 1986 by Hertel Wax. In 1990, Hertel filed for a U.S. patent on a "ski wax for use with sintered-base snow skis", containing paraffin, a hardener wax, roughly 1% per-fluoroether diol, and 2% SDS surfactant. In the 1990s, Swix chief chemist Leif Torgersen found a glide wax additive to repel pollen and other snow impurities—a problem with soft grip waxes during distance races—in the form of a fluorocarbon that could be ironed into the ski base. The solution was based on the work of Enrico Traverso at Enichem SpA, who had developed a fluorocarbon powder with a melting temperature just a few degrees below that of sintered polyethylene, patented in Italy as a "ski lubricant comprising paraffinic wax and hydrocarbon compounds containing a perfluorocarbon segment".

== Science of sliding on snow ==
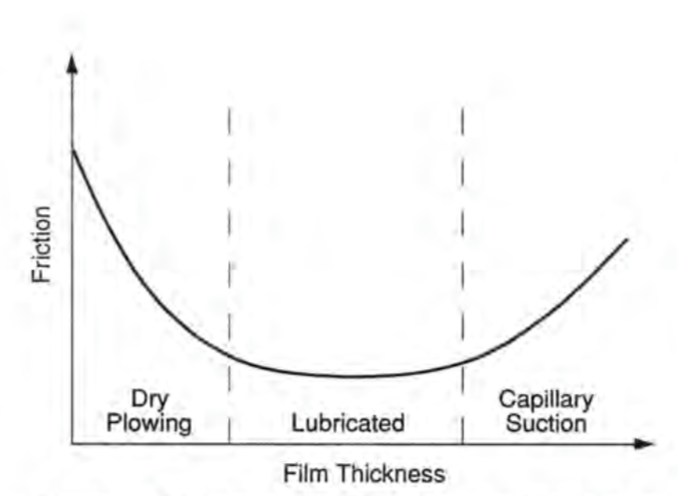
Conceptual representation of sliding friction over snow, as a function of water film thickness, created by passage of a ski or other slider over a snow surface

The ability of a ski or other runner to slide over snow depends on both the properties of the snow and the ski to result in an optimum amount of lubrication from melting the snow by friction with the ski—too little and the ski interacts with solid snow crystals, too much and capillary attraction of meltwater retards the ski.

=== Friction ===
Before a ski can slide, it must overcome the maximum value static friction, $F_{max} = \mu_\mathrm{s} F_{n}\,$, for the ski/snow contact, where $\mu_\mathrm{s}$ is the coefficient of static friction and $F_{n}\,$ is the normal force of the ski on snow. Kinetic (or dynamic) friction occurs when the ski is moving over the snow. The coefficient of kinetic friction, $\mu_\mathrm{k}$, is less than the coefficient of static friction for both ice and snow. The force required for sliding on snow is the product of the coefficient of kinetic friction and the normal force: $F_{k} = \mu_\mathrm{k} F_{n}\,$. Both the static and kinetic coefficients of friction increase with colder snow temperatures (also true for ice).

=== Snow properties ===
Snowflakes have a wide range of shapes, even as they fall; among these are: six-sided star-like dendrites, hexagonal needles, platelets and icy pellets. Once snow accumulates on the ground, the flakes immediately begin to undergo transformation (called metamorphism), owing to temperature changes, sublimation, and mechanical action. Temperature changes may be from the ambient temperature, solar radiation, rainwater, wind, or the temperature of the material beneath the snow layer. Mechanical action includes wind and compaction. Over time, bulk snow tends to consolidate—its crystals become truncated from breaking apart or losing mass with sublimation directly from solid to gas and with freeze-thaw, causing them to combine as coarse and granular ice crystals. Colbeck reports that fresh, cold, and man-made snow all interact more directly with the base of a ski and increase friction, indicating the use of harder waxes. Conversely, older, warmer, and denser snows present lower friction, in part due to increased grain size, which better promotes a water film and a smoother surface of the snow crystals for which softer waxes are indicated.

Freshly fallen and metamorphosed snow crystals

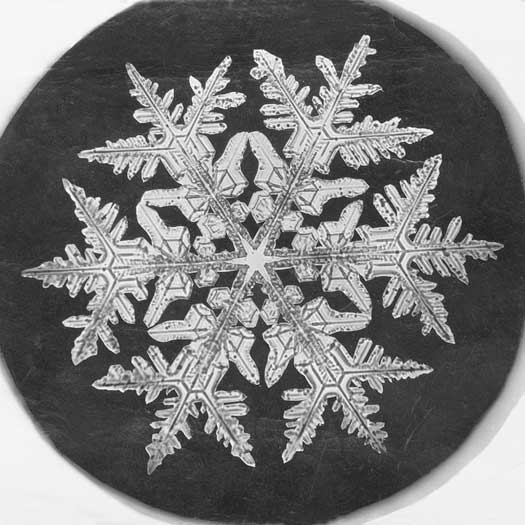
Dendritic snowflake—micrograph by Wilson Bentley

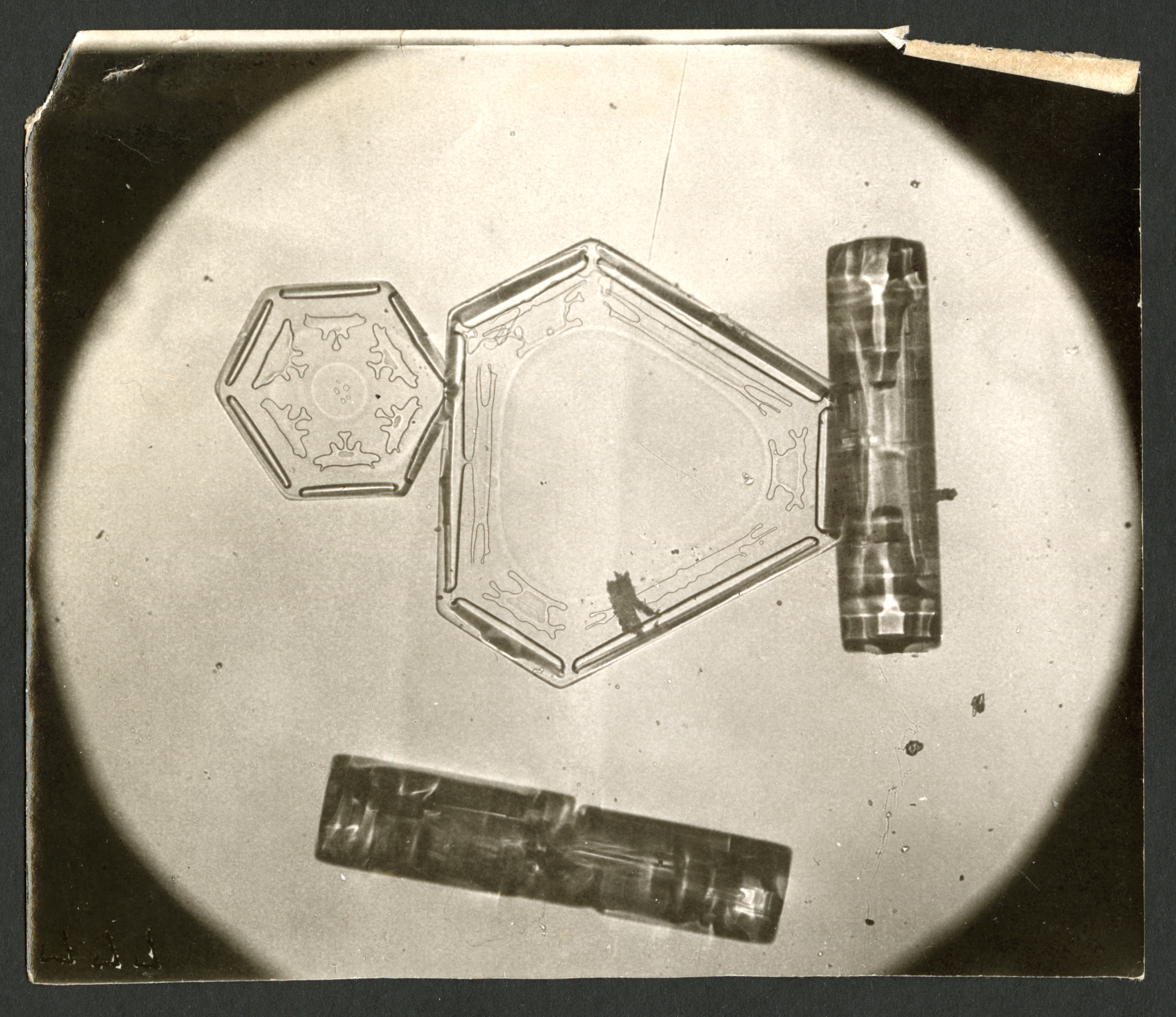
Platelets and needles, two alternate forms of snowflakes

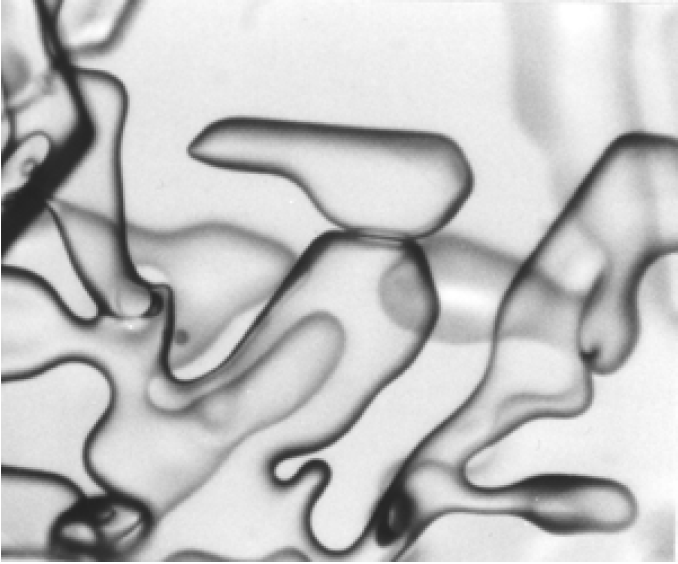
Fresh, dry snow with newly formed bonds, showing a grain boundary (top center)

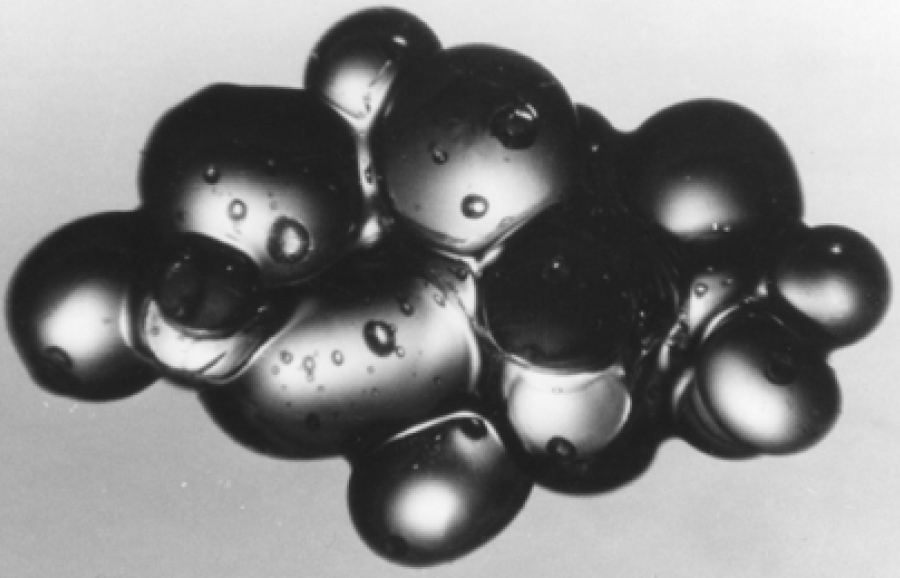
Cluster of ice grains in wet snow at a low liquid content—grain crystals range 0.5 to 1.0 mm.

=== Ski friction properties ===
Colbeck offers an overview of the five friction processes of skis on snow. They are the: 1) resistance due to plowing of snow out of the way, 2) deformation of the snow over which the ski is traveling, 3) lubrication of the ski with a thin layer of melt water, 4) capillary attraction of water in the snow to the ski bottom, and 5) contamination of the snow with dust and other non-slippery elements. Plowing and deformation pertain to the interaction of the ski, as a whole, with the snow and are negligible on a firm surface. Lubrication, capillary attraction and contamination are issues for the ski bottom and the wax that is applied to reduce sliding friction or achieve adequate grip.

Typically, a sliding ski melts a thin and transitory film of lubricating layer of water, caused by the heat of friction between the ski and the snow in its passing. Colbeck suggests that the optimum water film thickness is in the range between 4 and 12 μm. However, the heat generated by friction can be lost by conduction to a cold ski, thereby diminishing the production of the melt layer. At the other extreme, when the snow is wet and warm, heat generation creates a thicker film that can create increased capillary drag on the ski bottom. Kuzmin and Fuss suggest that the most favorable combination of ski base material properties to minimize ski sliding friction on snow include: increased hardness and lowered thermal conductivity of the base material to promote meltwater generation for lubrication, wear resistance in cold snow, and hydrophobicity to minimize capillary suction. These attributes are readily achievable with a PTFE base, which diminishes the value added by glide waxes. Lintzén reports that factors other than wax are much more important in reducing friction on cross-country skate skis—the curvature of the ski and snow conditions.

== Glide wax ==
Glide wax can be applied to alpine skis, snowboards, skate skis, classic skis, back-country skis, and touring skis. Traditional waxes comprise solid hydrocarbons. High-performance "fluorocarbon" waxes also contain fluorine, which substitutes some fraction of the hydrogen atoms in the hydrocarbons with fluorine atoms to achieve lower coefficients of friction and higher water repellency than the pure hydrocarbon wax can achieve. Wax is adjusted for hardness to minimize sliding friction as a function of snow properties, which include the effects of:

- Age: Reflects the metamorphism of snow crystals that are sharp and well-defined, when new, but with aging become broken or truncated with wind action or rounded into ice granules with freeze-thaw, all of which affects a ski's coefficient of friction.
- Moisture content: The percentage of mass that is liquid water and may create suction friction with the base of the ski as it slides.
- Temperature: Affects the ease with which sliding friction can melt snow crystals at the interface between ski and snow.

=== Properties ===
A variety of glide waxes are tailored for specific temperature ranges and other snow properties with varying wax hardness and other properties that address repellence of moisture and dirt. The hardness of the glide wax affects the melting of the snow to lubricate its passage over the surface and its ability to avoid suction from meltwater in the snow. Too little melting and sharp edges of snow crystals or too much suction impede the passage of the ski. A tipping point between where crystal type dominates sliding friction and moisture content dominates occurs around 26 °F (−3 °C). Harder waxes address colder, drier or more abrasive snow conditions, whereas softer waxes have a lower coefficient of friction, but abrade more readily. Wax formulations combine three types of wax to adjust coefficient of friction and durability. From hard to soft, they include synthetic waxes with 50 or more carbon atoms, microcrystalline waxes with 25 to 50 carbon atoms and paraffin waxes with 20 to 35 carbon atoms. Additives to such waxes include graphite, teflon, silicon, fluorocarbons, and molybdenum to improve glide and/or reduce dirt accumulation.

=== Application ===
Glide wax can be applied cold or hot. Liquid or spray waxes are most often used for cold applications. Some hard waxes and wax pastes can also be applied cold, though these typically require the heat generated by the friction of a waxing cork to properly adhere.

Hot applications of wax include the use of heat from an iron, infrared lamp, a "hot box" oven, or a waxing machine.

=== Base material ===
The role of glide wax is to adapt and improve the friction properties of a ski base to the expected snow properties to be encountered on a spectrum from cold crystalline snow to saturated granular snow. Modern ski bases often are made from ultra-high-molecular-weight polyethylene (UHMWPE). Kuzmin asserts that UHMWPE is non-porous and can hold neither wax nor water, so there is no possibility for filling pores; furthermore, he asserts that UHMWPE is very hydrophobic, which means that wet snow does not appreciably retard the ski and that glide wax offers little additional ability to repel water. He notes that clear bases are more durable and hydrophobic than those with carbon content. The same author asserts that texture is more important than surface chemistry for creating the optimum balance between a running surface that's too dry (not slippery enough) and too wet (ski subject to suction forces). In warm, moist snow, texture can help break the retarding capillary attraction between the ski base and the snow. Giesbrecht agrees that low wetting angle of the ski base is key and also emphasizes the importance of the degree of surface roughness at the micrometre scale as a function of snow temperature—cold snow favoring a smoother surface and wetter, warmer snow favoring a textured surface. Some authors question the necessity to use any glide waxes on modern ski bases.

== Grip wax ==
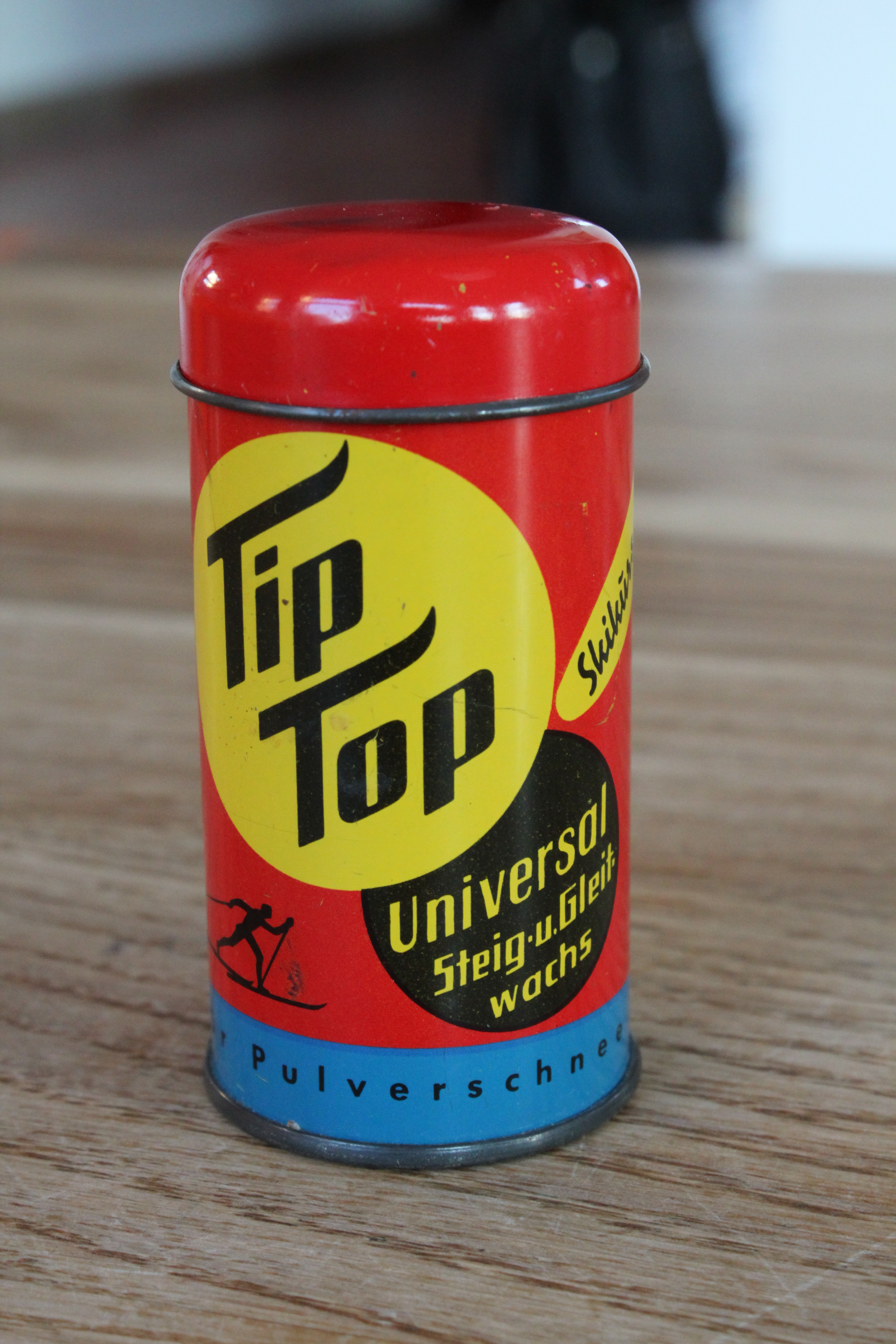
Canister of vintage German grip wax

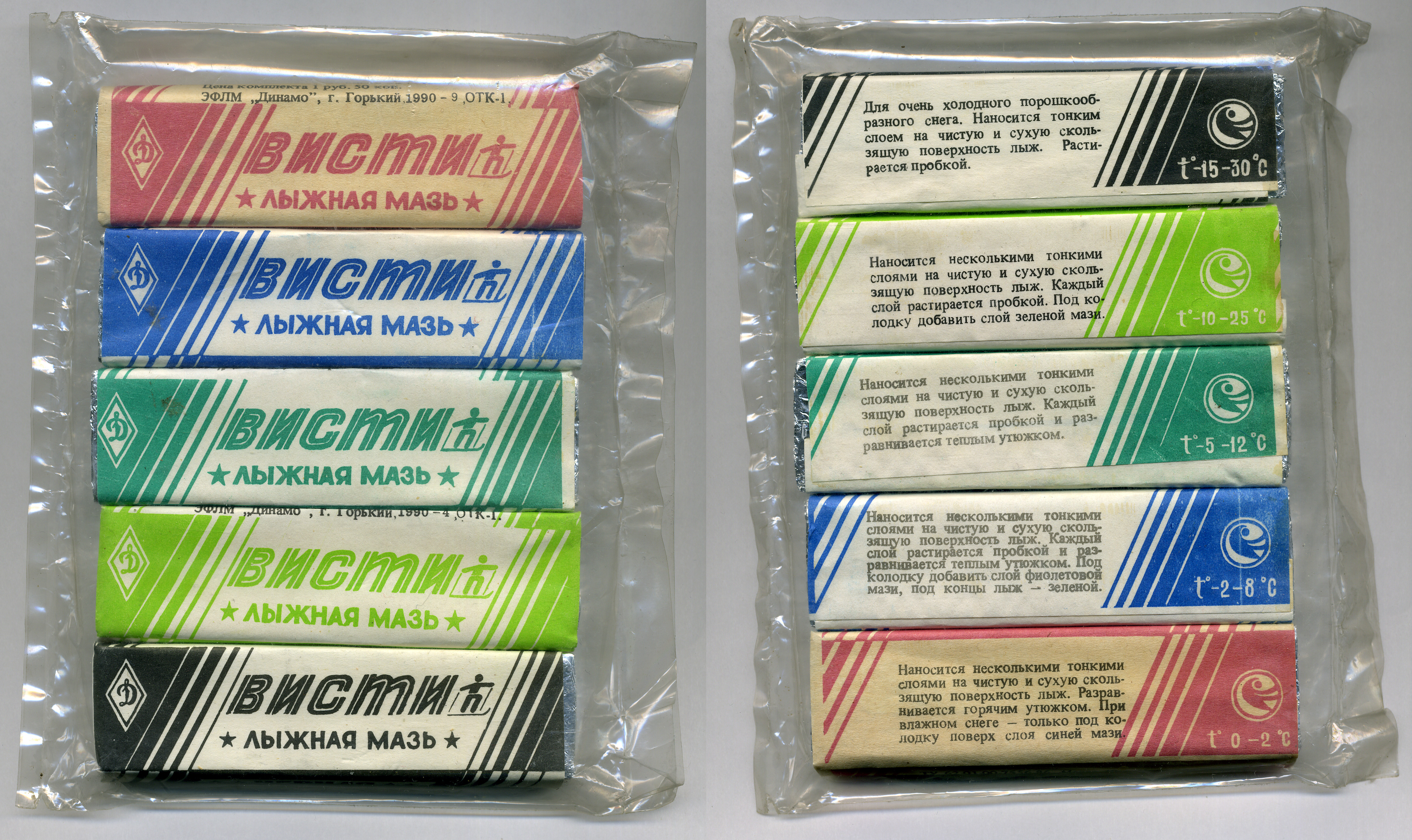
Soviet-era Visti (Висти)–brand klisters, graded by color and temperature range

Cross-country skiers use a grip wax (also called "kick wax") for waxable classic skis to provide traction with static friction on the snow that allows them to propel themselves forward on flats and up hills. They are applied in an area beneath the skier's foot and extending, somewhat forward, that is formed by the camber of the classic ski, called the "grip zone" (or "kick zone"). The presence of camber allows the skis to grip the snow, when the weight is on one ski and the ski is fully flexed, but minimize drag when the skis are weighted equally and are thus less than fully flexed. Grip waxes are designed for specific temperature ranges and types of snow; a correctly selected grip wax does not appreciably decrease the glide of skis that have proper camber for the skier's weight and for the snow conditions. There are two substances used for grip wax: hard wax and klister.

- Hard wax: A traditionally paraffin wax-based substance with admixtures for snow comprising crystals that are relatively intact and not substantially transformed by packing or freeze-thaw. The admixtures, which include a dye, rubber, rosin, resin and colophony, adjust the hardness of the wax to tailor the effectiveness of its grip for specific, discrete temperature ranges (from approximately -25 °F to +35 °F); waxes are graded and color-coded according to these temperature ranges. Harder grip waxes are designed for colder snow temperatures, but grip poorly in warm temperatures. Conversely, softer waxes in cold temperatures create enough friction and melting that the melt layer may accumulate and promote frozen accretion of snow.
- Klister: A sticky ointment, which may contain a combination of rosins, waxes, solvents and fats—with the formulation tailored for snow that comprises coarse crystals, having been transformed through freeze-thaw or being wind-blown, and adjusted for specific temperature ranges. Spray-on klister is often more convenient than klister applied from a tube. An incorrect match of klister to snow conditions can also cause icing.
- Waxless skis: Instead of wax, some skis use a texture in the kick zone to prevent the ski from sliding backwards. A common texture resembles fish scales or other small ridges that offer kick in a variety of conditions at the expense of speed, owing to their greater sliding resistance. Other textures include hairs that lie flat, when moving forward or engage the snow when pushed backwards; these vary in scale from visible to microscopic, the latter working best around 0 °C.
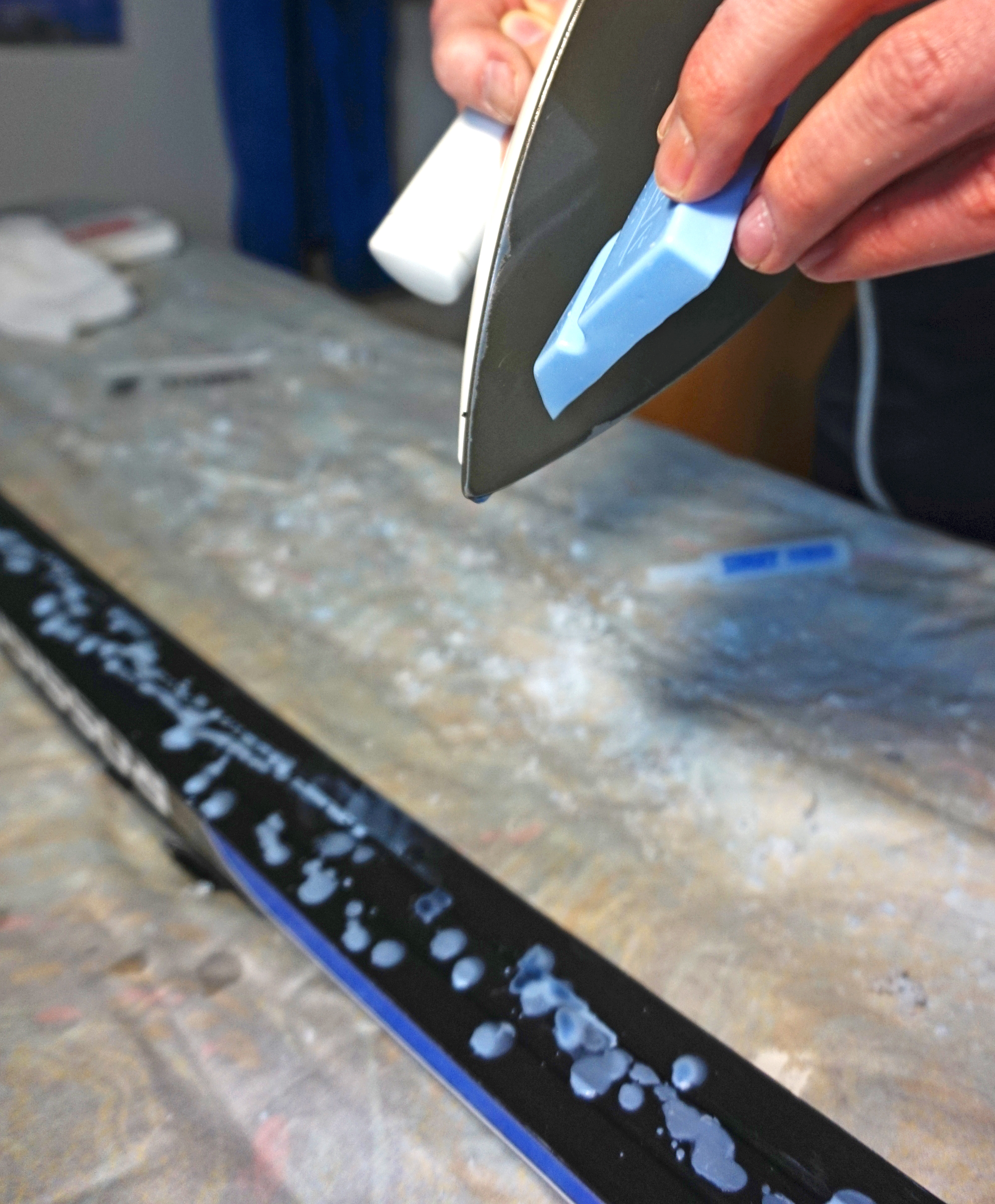
Melting glide wax onto a skate ski to be ironed in and scraped smooth

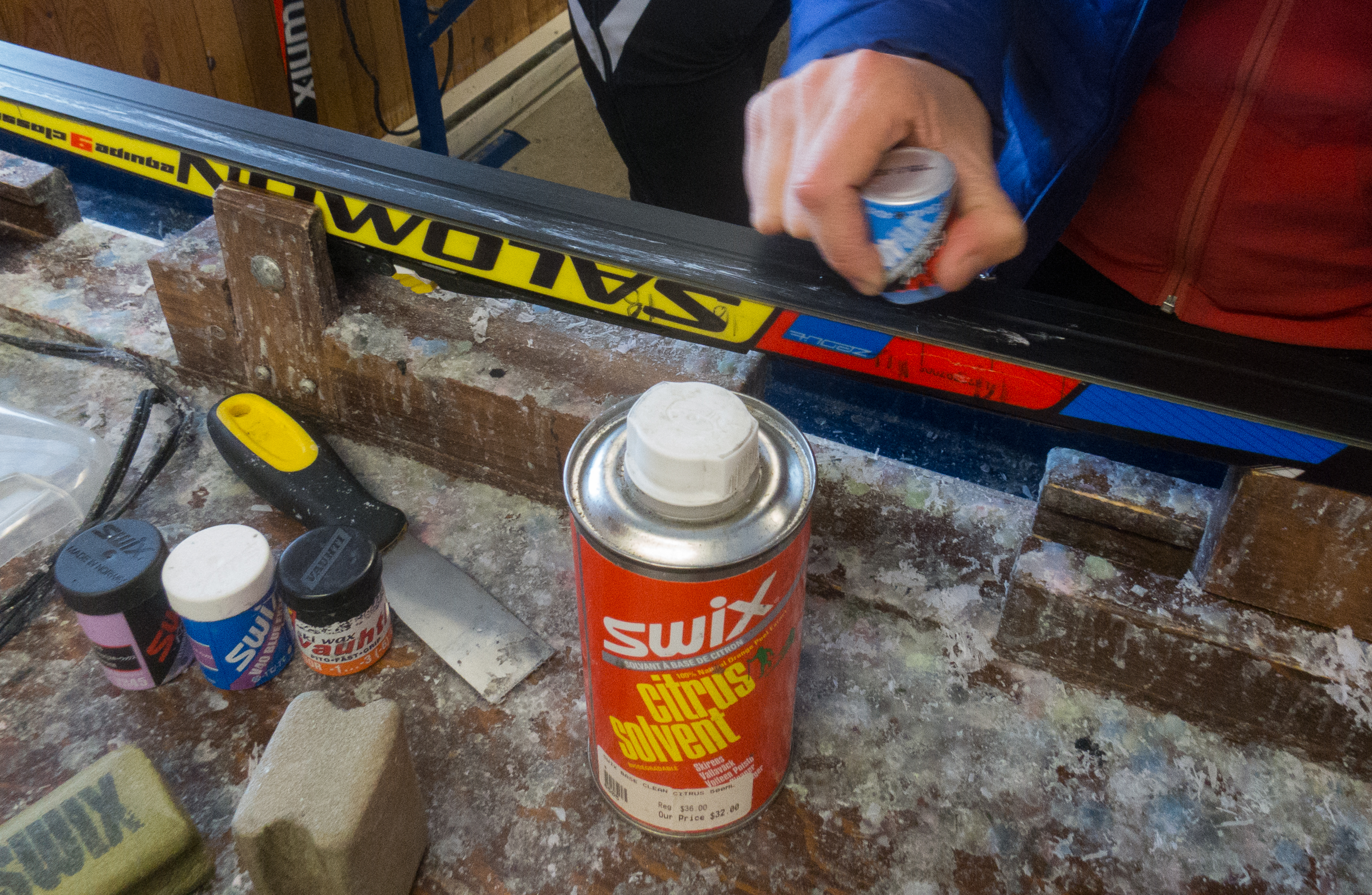
Application of grip wax to a classic cross-country ski, using a canister of wax, like those shown in the left foreground

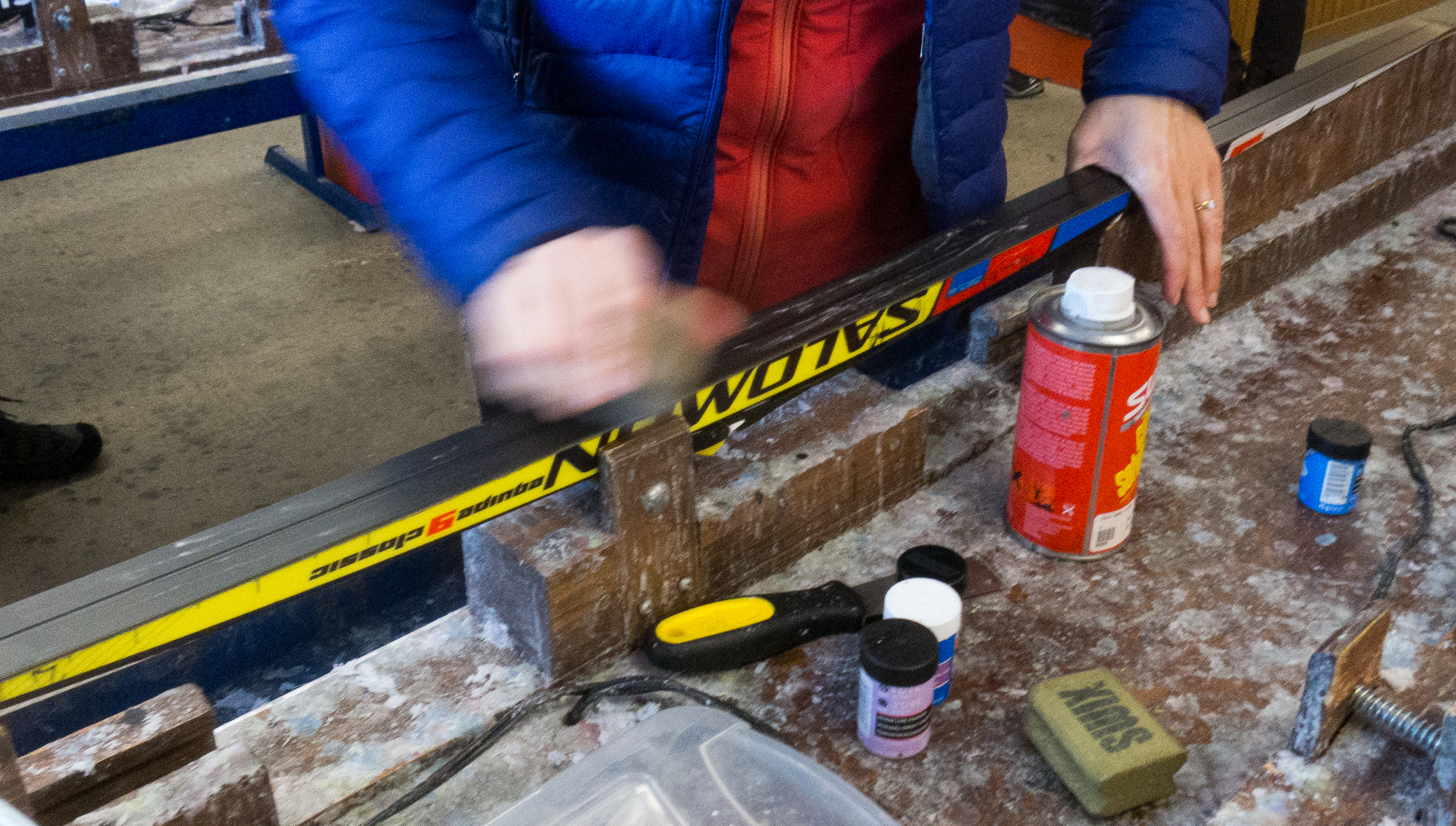
Smoothing of grip wax on a classic cross-country ski, using a hand-held "cork", like the item marked "Swix" in the right foreground

== Wax solvents ==
Wax can be dissolved by non-polar solvents like mineral spirits. However, some commercial wax solvents are made from citrus oil, which is less toxic, harder to ignite, and gentler on the ski base. When removing grip wax, these are typically used in combination with a scraper and/or an abrasive pad to help the solvent work into the wax and lift it from the ski surface.

== Fluorinated waxes ==
Fluorinated waxes are a mixture of simple waxes and fluorinated waxes available in varying proportions. They glide slightly better and repel dirt slightly better than conventional waxes (also known as hydrocarbon waxes) because they are slightly more hydrophobic due to the fluorination.

Fluorinated glide waxes are divided into different product categories:

- Products with a low fluorine content of 0.5–1.5% (low-fluoro ski wax, LF)
- Products with a high fluorine content of 4–12% (high-fluoro ski wax, HF)
- Products that only contain fluorine compounds (pure fluorocarbon, FC or Cera)

Semifluorinated alkanes are used in the first two categories, while perfluoroalkanes are used in the third.

Structural formula of F_{6}H_{16}, an example of semifluorinated n-alkanes

Structural formula perfluorododecane, used in FC waxes

Around 20 tonnes of fluorinated waxes have been produced annually in the European Economic Area.

=== Health effects ===
Fluorinated ski wax contains chemicals with potential health affects including per- and polyfluoroalkyl substances (PFASs). Levels of perfluorinated carboxylic acids, especially perfluorooctanoic acid (PFOA), have been shown to increase in ski wax technicians during the ski season. The use of respirators and protective garments may reduce the risk of PFAS exposure.

=== Environmental effects ===
When skiing, the friction between the snow and skis causes wax to abrade and remain in the snow pack until spring thaw. Then the snowmelt drains into watersheds, streams, lakes and rivers, thereby changing the chemistry of the environment and the food chain. PFASs in ski wax are heat resistant, chemically and biologically stable, and thus environmentally persistent. They have been shown to accumulate in animals that are present at ski venues. The International Ski Federation (FIS) introduced a ban on waxes containing PFASs, often labelled "fluor" or "fluoro" waxes, in all competitive ski disciplines from the winter season of 2020/21. In January 2022, the EPA released an enforcement alert which revealed that the manufacture and import of waxes containing PFAS violated the Toxic Substances Control Act. Most major manufacturers of competition ski wax have since ended production of waxes containing PFASs.
