= Katharina Andresen =

Norwegian billionaire heiress

- Born: Katharina Gamlemshaug Andresen; 21 May 1995 (age 31); Oslo, Norway
- Parent: Johan H. Andresen Jr.
- Relatives: Alexandra Andresen (sister)

Katharina Gamlemshaug Andresen (born 21 May 1995) is a Norwegian heiress, and as of 2020, the world's third-youngest billionaire (US$ 1.1 billion) as reported by Forbes.

She is the daughter of Johan H. Andresen Jr., owner of Ferd AS, who, in 2007, transferred 42.2% ownership stakes each to Katharina and her sister Alexandra. She is the great-granddaughter of Johan H. Andresen, great-great-granddaughter of Johan Henrik Andresen and Anton Klaveness, and great-great-great-granddaughter of Nicolai Andresen. Johan Henrik was the brother of Nicolay August Andresen, and the uncle of Nils August Andresen Butenschøn.

In November 2017, Andresen was fined 250,000kr (US$27,000) for drunken driving. Andresen's blood-alcohol content was three times the legal limit. Alongside the fine, the sentence included a 13-month license suspension.

In 2019, she stated that she would be moving to London, England.

An advisor for Oslo Pride, Andresen is known as a supporter of LGBTQ+ rights.
