= Alexandra Andresen =

Norwegian heiress

- Born: Alexandra Gamlemshaug Andresen; 23 July 1996 (age 29); Oslo, Norway
- Partner: Colin Thompson
- Parent: Johan H. Andresen Jr.
- Relatives: Katharina Andresen (sister)

Alexandra Gamlemshaug Andresen (born 23 July 1996) is a Norwegian heiress and equestrian. She became the world's youngest billionaire at age 19 in 2016 and held the position of youngest billionaire on the Forbes list for three consecutive years. As of June 2025, Andresen's net worth is estimated at US$2.1 billion.

== Early life ==
Andresen is the daughter of Norwegian industrialist Johan H. Andresen Jr., owner of Ferd AS, who in 2007, transferred ownership stakes of 42.2 per cent each to Alexandra and her sister Katharina (even though their father insists that he will not force his daughters to take part in the family company if they do not want to).

She is the great-granddaughter of Johan H. Andresen, great-great-granddaughter of Johan Henrik Andresen and Anton Klaveness, and great-great-great-granddaughter of Nicolai Andresen. Johan Henrik was the brother of Nicolay August Andresen, and the uncle of Nils August Andresen Butenschøn.

== Career ==
Andresen has won multiple awards and honors in horse dressage competitions, and has modeled several times for equestrian clothing company KingsLand.
