= Sintered polyethylene =

Polyethylene formed by selective laser sintering

Sintered polyethylene is a polyethylene powder that is formed into a solid without melting it. It can be produced using heat, pressure, or selective laser sintering. It has applications as a coating on pipes and skis, and as a filter medium.

== Applications ==
=== Pipes ===
Sintered polyethylene is applied to steel pipes to resist corrosion. Pipes are heated and then polyethylene powder coated, either electrostatically or through immersion.

=== Skis ===
Sintered polyethylene was introduced as a coating on skis in 1962. It is more durable, and less dense than solid, extruded polyethylene. Its porous structure allows the ski to absorb wax.

=== Filter medium ===
Sinter plate filter elements were developed in Germany during the years of 1981 and 1982. These rigid filter elements are used in dust collectors and will produce clean gas values of 0.1 to 1.0 mg/m^{3} with emissions of 0.001 pounds per hour with a maximum of 0.0004 gr/ft3, even with dusts of D50 < 1 μm. The EPA defines high efficiency as removal of 0 to 5.0 μm particulates.

The filter element matrix consists of molded sintered polyethylene (PE) with a reinforced mounting header. An additional PTFE-coating gets into the pores of the PE-basic body and forms a micro-porous, non-sticking surface resulting in surface-loaded filtration. This combined material is chemical resistant and unaffected by slight moisture. The rigid sinter plate filters have an extremely stable structure and can be recycled. The average useful life of a sinter plate filter element can exceed 10 years.

Sinter plate PE filter elements are environmentally compatible. They produce no toxic waste in themselves and can be washed off and reused. There is no contamination of material from filter fibers like fabric and cartridge media elements. Dust collector#Fabric Collectors

The rigidity of the matrix results in no wear from abrasive material. Cleaning is accomplished by on-line, low-pressure reverse air jet-pulse. Standard elements will handle temperatures up to 158 °F with improved elements designed for up to 230 °F

The separation efficiency exceeds that required by the BIA-certificate regarding dust classification M.
