= Erasmus Research Institute of Management =

Dutch research institute

Coordinates: 51°54′57.9″N 4°31′27.58″E

Erasmus Research Institute of Management (ERIM)
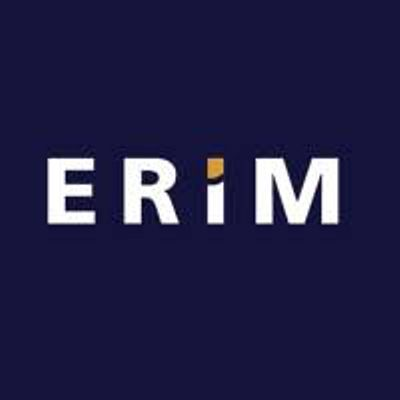
- ERIM logo
- Type: Research institute
- Established: 1998; 28 years ago
- President: Prof.dr. Pursey Heugens
- Administrative staff: ~450
- Location: Rotterdam, Netherlands
- Website: www.erim.eur.nl

The Erasmus Research Institute of Management (ERIM) is the joint research institute of the Rotterdam School of Management and the Erasmus School of Economics, both at Erasmus University Rotterdam. It aims to bring together top researchers in business and management from each of these schools. Alongside its research program ERIM also has a graduate program in management designed to attract and train young scholars from around the world. ERIM seeks to contribute to "scientific research that enables organisations to assess and improve their business processes in order to perform in a profitable and responsible way."

== History ==
ERIM was founded in 1999. It modeled itself on the top American and European business schools such as Wharton Business School, Stanford Graduate School of Business, UCLA Anderson School of Management, London Business School, and INSEAD.

By 2010, ERIM has become one of the top three schools in business research in Europe, and is among the top 25 in the world. It has achieved a top ranking at the Social Science Research Network (SSRN), periodically ranking first outside the United States.

In the next decade, ERIM will additionally focus on impacting business practice and the views of business professionals and the general public.

== Research ==
Within ERIM, research in management is divided into five broad streams: marketing; finance and accounting; strategy; organization and business processes; logistics and information systems.

Currently, more than 200 researchers are engaged in ERIM’s research programs. They are an international collection of researchers with backgrounds in business administration as well as other disciplines such as psychology, sociology, economics, econometrics and technical sciences.

Also under ERIM’s umbrella are more than 20 specialist research centers, focusing on topics as diverse as customer value chains, mutual and hedge funds, neuroeconomics, entrepreneurship, closed loop supply chains, sustainability, climate change, and business in China.

== Doctoral program ==
ERIM offers a five-year doctoral program that includes two years of course work (following which the candidate receives a Master title) and three-years for dissertation. The program is aimed at building competitive researchers, would could lead faculty positions and become “thought leaders”.

=== PhD in Management ===
The ERIM PhD Program in Management is part of the doctoral program. To enter the program, an MPhil, MSc or M.A. degree is mandatory. In 2010, around 100 students from around 30 countries were enrolled in the PhD program.

ERIM offers two types of PhD Projects:

- ERIM Predefined PhD Projects train future researchers in or across five key disciplines of management: business processes, logistics & information systems, organization, marketing, finance, and strategy. These projects are initiated each year.
- ERIM Open PhD Projects are designed to give PhD candidates much freedom in choosing their own research topic. These open projects are financed with an endowment of 800,000 euros from the Netherlands Organisation for Scientific Research (NWO). ERIM was one of nine Dutch academic institutions who were awarded the grant in 2009, which was intended to give future doctoral students more say in the research to be carried out. A limited number of open projects was initiated in 2010.

=== Research Master in Business Research ===
The ERIM Master of Philosophy in Business Research is part of the doctoral programme. This Research Master is designed for academically talented and motivated students who wish to combine education in a specialization area of their choice with conducting research in that field.

== See also ==
- Econometric Institute
- Tinbergen Institute
- TRAIL Research School
