= Bjørn Flatgård =

Bjørn Flatgård (born 13 September 1949) is a Norwegian businessperson.

He is the deputy chair of Aker Solutions and chair of SalMar.

He was educated with a Master of Science in Chemical Engineering from the Norwegian Institute of Technology, and also holds a degree from BI Norwegian Business School. He has been vice president for Hafslund Nycomed and Nycomed, and CEO of Nycomed Pharma. From 1996 to 2007 he was the CEO of Elopak.
