= Rotterdam School of Management, Erasmus University =

International business school of Erasmus University in Rotterdam, Netherlands

Rotterdam School of Management, Erasmus University (RSM)
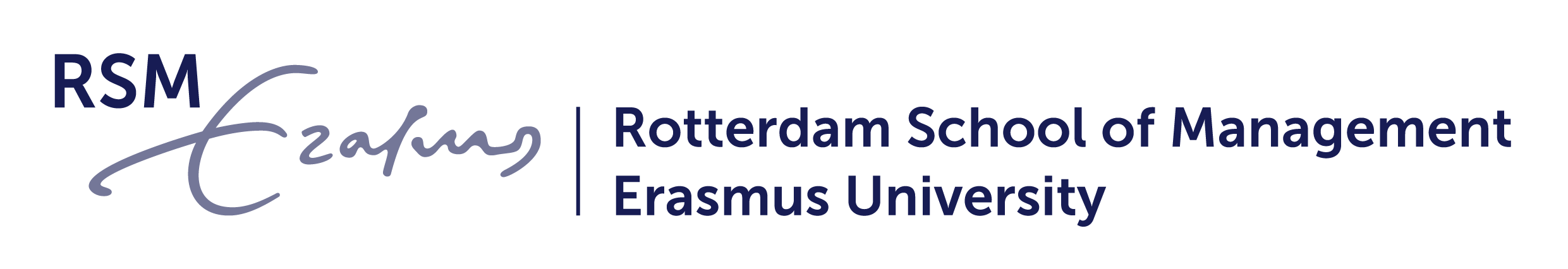
- Motto: A force for positive change
- Type: Business school
- Established: 1970
- Affiliations: AMBA, EQUIS, AACSB, CEMS, Erasmus University Rotterdam
- Endowment: €66.4 Million (2016)
- Dean: Prof. Ansgar Richter
- Faculty: 250 senior researchers and 150 PhD students
- Students: 10 000
- Location: Burgemeester Oudlaan 50; 3062 PA, Rotterdam, Netherlands
- Colors: Erasmus night blue
- Website: www.rsm.nl

Rotterdam School of Management, Erasmus University (or RSM) is the business school of the Erasmus University Rotterdam located in Rotterdam, Netherlands. RSM offers undergraduate and postgraduate programmes mostly taught in English, including MBA, executive education, and PhD programmes.

Rotterdam School of Management, Erasmus University is ranked among the best business schools in Europe and in the world, while ranked 1st worldwide according to the 2021 Shanghai Global Ranking of Academic Subjects in the category Business Administration. RSM is also a member of the Partnership in International Management (PIM) network, and hosts a diverse international student body. In 2013, RSM became part of the Alliance of European and Chinese Business Schools, which is under the patronage of the European Federation of Management Development.

== History ==
=== Erasmus University ===
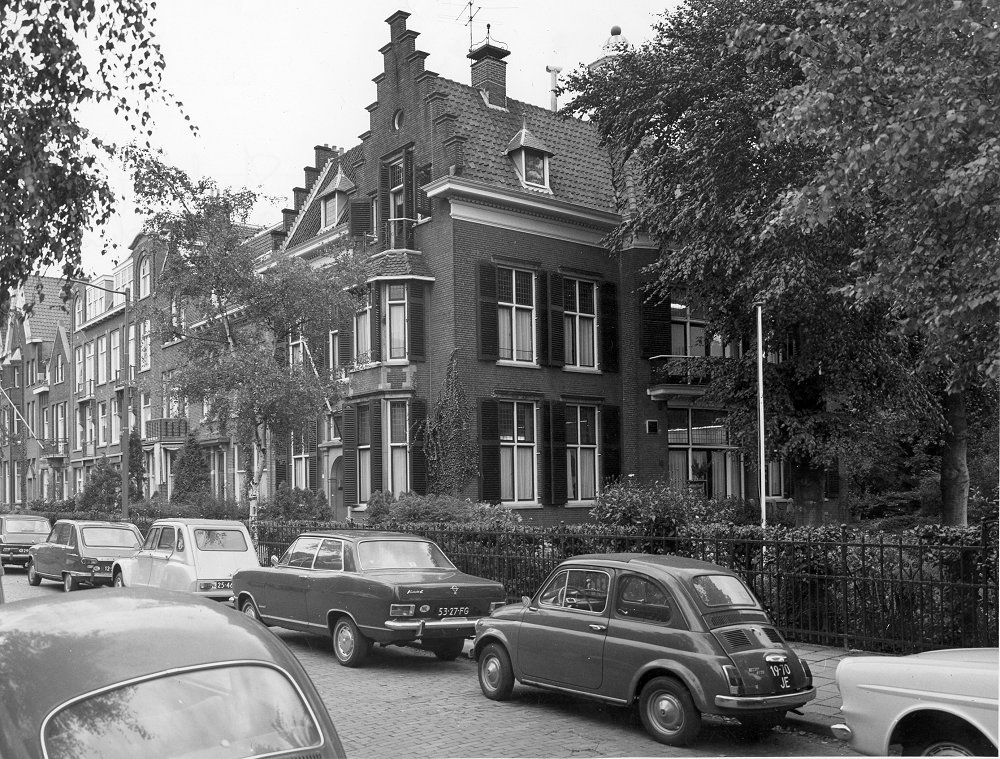
Historical building of RSM in Kralingen-Crooswijk

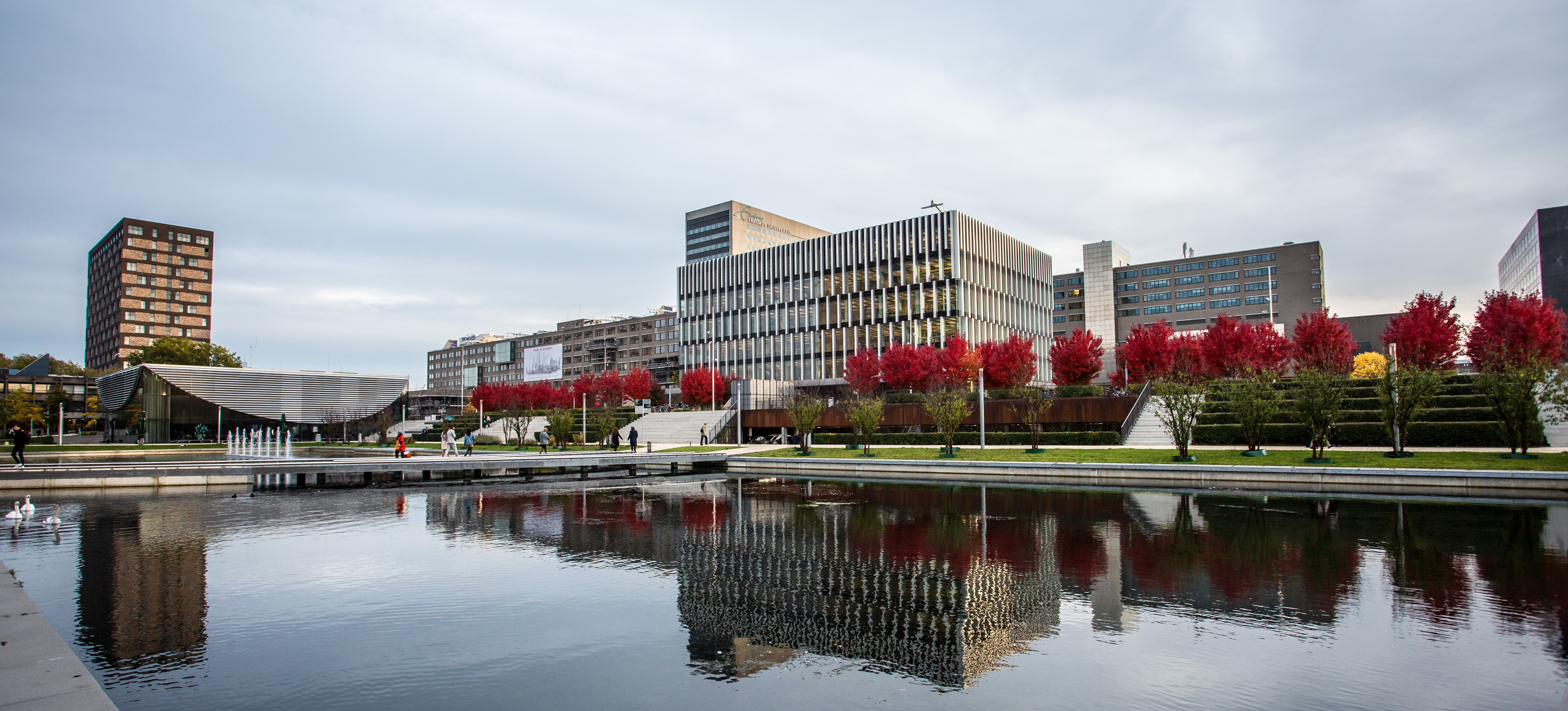
Campus of the university with the buildings of RSM

The roots of RSM stretch back to the founding of Erasmus University as the Dutch School of Higher Commercial Education in 1913. Originally a business-oriented institution, the Dutch School of Higher Commercial Education was a private initiative established with the support of the Rotterdam business community.

In 1966 Erasmus University (then the Netherlands Institute for Economic Science), commissioned an investigation into the feasibility of founding a Graduate School of Management dedicated to the subject of business administration. The result, inaugurated in 1969, was the 'Interfaculteit Bedrijfskunde/Graduate School of Management', a joint initiative of the schools of economics, law and social sciences of Erasmus University, and the schools of civil, mechanical and maritime engineering and general sciences at the Delft University of Technology.

=== Graduate School of Management ===
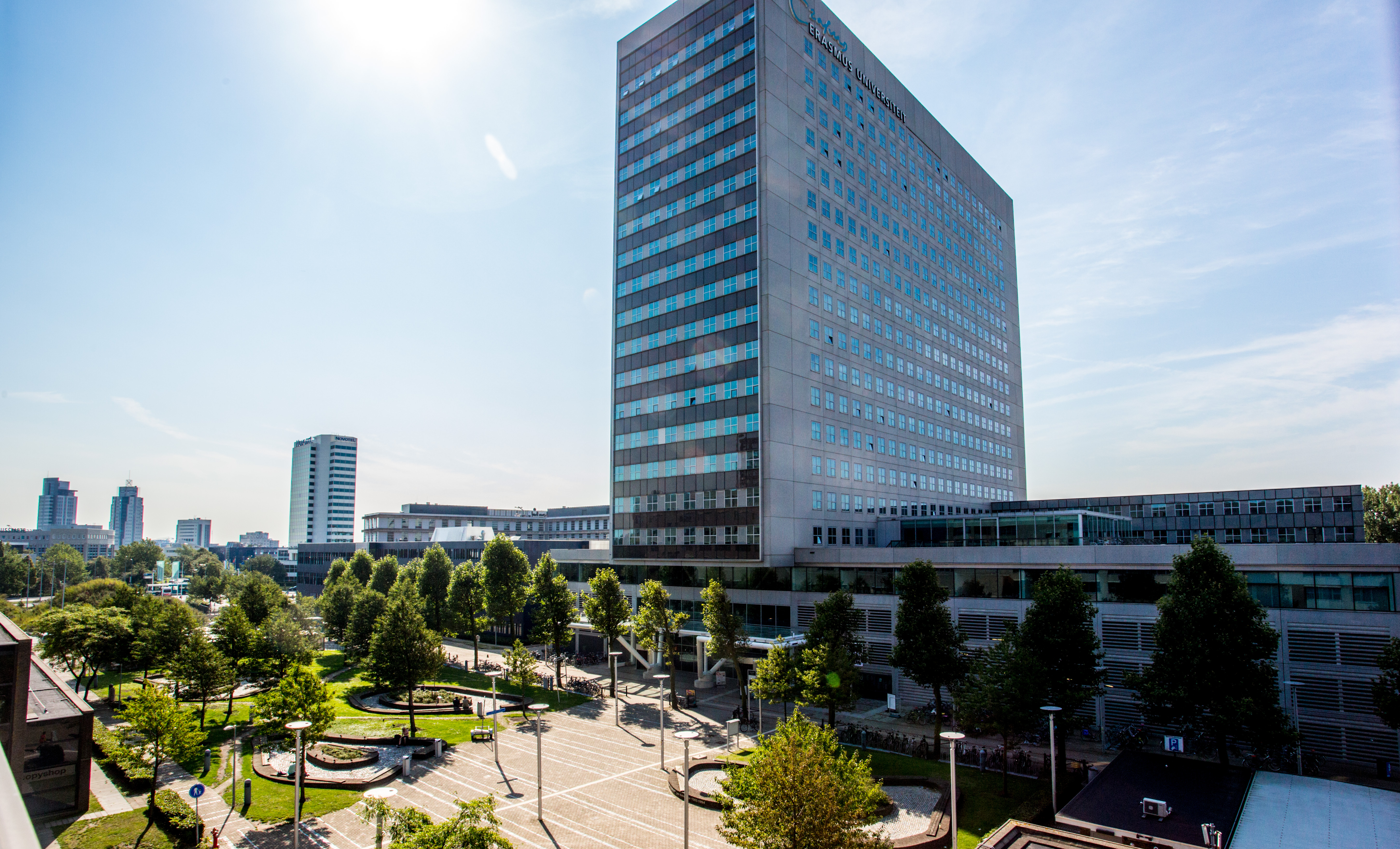
Main building RSM

Rotterdam School of Management, Erasmus University first opened its doors in 1970 in the suburb of Kralingen, Rotterdam. The first 30 students began classes in the two-year 'post-kandidaats' programme (equivalent to a master's). The school became the first in the Netherlands to offer the degree "Doctorandus in de Bedrijfskunde" post-kandidaats, for students with a university qualification in a non-business discipline.

In 1972 the school moved to new premises in Delft and was once again remodelled, this time as the Interuniversities Institute for Business Administration ('Interuniversitair Instituut Bedrijfskunde' or IIB). It had only one division, the 'Interuniversitaire Interfaculteit Bedrijfskunde/Graduate School of Management Delft'. In November that year the first 29 students graduated with the new academic degree 'Doctorandus in de Bedrijfskunde' (Drs.), and the Alumni Association VIB, the 'Vereniging van afgestudeerden van de Interfaculteit Bedrijfskunde' was formally established.

=== Internationalisation ===
In 1975 the curriculum was revised and, from 1977 onwards, the focus turned towards the internationalisation of the school. The first exchange programme was established in 1980 with the French Institut Supérieur des Affaires, visited by IIB-students Hans van der Laan and Rino Schreuder. The second exchange programme was established with the Wharton School of the University of Pennsylvania in 1986. The number of English-language modules with an international focus expanded. In 1984 the four-year 'doctorandus' programme was launched. The first European CEMS master's degree was conferred in 1991, a result of RSM's membership in the renowned CEMS network.

In 1986 the Graduate School of Management Delft moved back to the premises of Erasmus University, and was renamed the Faculty of Business Administration. The doctoral programme was established in the same year. In 1993 the ERASM research school was founded, bringing together researchers from the Faculty of Business Administration and the School of Economics. It is known today as the Erasmus Research Institute of Management (ERIM).

In 2000 the BSc International Business Administration programme (IBA) was established, an English-language bachelor (undergraduate) programme which aims to provide a truly international learning experience with a large proportion of students from outside the Netherlands.

=== Foundation for Business Administration (Stichting Bedrijfskunde) ===
In 1966 a consensus on the lack of suitable training and higher educational facilities for managers in the Netherlands spurred Dutch-based multinationals including Royal Dutch Shell, Unilever and Philips to establish the Foundation for Business Administration (Stichting Bedrijfskunde), which was attached to the Netherlands University of Economics at Rotterdam. This started out as an institute for postgraduate management education, and later became Rotterdam School of Management (RSM).

The founders of RSM each donated two million guilders and included:

- Royal Dutch Shell
- Algemene Kunstzijde Unie
- Koninklijke Zout/Ketjen (Akzo Nobel)
- Amsterdam-Rotterdam Bank
- Algemene Bank Nederland (ABN AMRO)
- Unilever
- Philips Gloeilampen fabriek
- Koninklijke Hoogovens en Staalfabrieken (Tata Steel Europe)

=== Rotterdam School of Management, Erasmus University ===
In 1985 Rotterdam School of Management launched its International Full-time MBA programme, initially offered in both Dutch and English. In 1986 the 'post-kandidaats' IMSEC exchange programme was absorbed into the MBA, and a new IMScEC 'doctorandus' programme was launched.

In 2003 RSM joined four schools located in three continents to create the "Global Executive OneMBA".

In 2004 Rotterdam School of Management merged with Erasmus University's Faculty of Business Administration and the Erasmus Research Institute of Management to become Rotterdam School of Management, Erasmus University (RSM).

In 2006 the MSc General Management programme was established, a new master's degree for non-business graduates, now called the MScBA Master in Management.

In 2011 the school appointed Professor Steef van de Velde as dean, who was re-appointed for a second term in 2015.

In 2015 RSM opened an office in Chengdu, China. The RSM China office offers services to prospective students, partners, and alumni as well as maintains relationships with research universities and business schools.

In 2019 the school appointed Professor Ansgar Richter as dean. As of 2022, Professor Werner Brouwer has been serving as interim dean. A new dean is expected to be appointed in Fall 2024.

== Academics ==
=== Admissions ===
The admission procedure varies for bachelor and master programmes. Bachelor programme in International Business Administration at RSM was the most popular and among the most competitive programmes in the Netherlands, receiving 2,605 foreign student and 767 Dutch student applications for the 550 available places in 2018. The admission to the programme are mostly based on previous academic performance as well as CV and motivation.

For the master admission candidates are selected based on sufficient background in bachelor studies as well as academic performance, GMAT results and English proficiency.

=== Rankings ===
Business school rankings

Europe
- QS MBA: 14
- Financial Times MBA: 18

Global
- QS MBA: 30
- Financial Times MBA: 52

According to the Financial Times, QS and Forbes; RSM is ranked as follows:

	2015	2016	2017	2018	2019	2020	2022
FT European Business School Ranking	13th	10th	9th	9th	12th	15th	14th
FT Global MBA	45th	42nd	31st	37th	55th	66th	86th
FT MBA for Women	-	-	-	50th			
FT Executive MBA (EMBA Program)	60th	54th	54th	51st	59th		
FT Executive MBA (OneMBA Program)	24th	29th					
FT Master in Management	5th	5th	11th	8th	6th	5th	3rd
FT Master in Finance (Pre-experience)	23rd	22nd	36th	34th		35th	31st
FT Executive Education - Open		72nd	58th	59th	65th		
FT Executive Education - Customized		65th	66th	63rd	60th		
QS World University Rankings: Global MBA				25th	27th	29th	
QS Master in management				13th	13th	18th	
Forbes International MBAs					14th		
QS Master in Marketing Management (world)					16th	19th	
QS Master in Finance (world)						23rd	26th

== Programmes ==
=== Bachelor programmes ===
- BSc in Business Administration / Bedrijfskunde (in Dutch)
- BSc in International Business Administration (IBA)

=== Master programmes ===
- MScBA in Management
- MScBA in Management (Part time)
- MScBA in Accounting & Financial Management
- MScBA in Business Analytics & Management
- MSc in Business Information Management
- MSc in Finance & Investments
- MSc in Global Business and Sustainability (formerly Global Business and Stakeholder Management)
- MSc in Human Resource Management
- MSc in International Management
- MSc in Management of Innovation
- ERIM Research Master in Business and Management
- MSc in Marketing Management
- MSc in Organisational Change & Consulting
- MSc in Strategic Entrepreneurship
- MSc in Strategic Management
- MSc in Supply Chain Management

=== Pre-master programmes ===
- Pre-master Business Administration / Bedrijfskunde (Dutch)
- Pre-master Business Administration (English)

=== MBA programmes ===
- International Full-time MBA
- Executive MBA

=== Research programmes ===
- ERIM Research Master in Business and Management
- PhD in Management

=== Executive Master programmes ===
- MSc in Corporate Communication
- Full-time MBA, Executive MBA and Global Executive OneMBA
- MSc in Maritime Economics & Logistics
- MSc in Customs and Supply Chain Compliance

=== Customised programmes ===
Through RSM's customized programs, employees can access modern business and management thinking while engaging with influential thought leaders. These programs are designed for each client by a team of consultants, and can be delivered in-house.

=== Open programmes ===
Led by internationally recognised academic and business experts, RSM's current portfolio of open programmes includes:

- General Management
- Leadership & People Development
- Finance & Accounting
- Strategy
- Marketing and Sales
- Management of Technology, Innovation and Sustainability
- Corporate Communication

== Student life ==
RSM's study association STAR is Europe's largest student ruled study association, with more than 6,500 members. STAR's committees include Consultancy Castle, RSM STAR Case Club, Erasmus Recruitment Days, Management Week, and others. Additionally, there are numerous student clubs at RSM. The focus is on specific business areas as well as event organization.

In 1985, students of the RSM faculty founded the study association 'RSM Student Representation' (SR). The goal of SR is to voice student feedback toward the faculty personnel. SR strives for improving the education of the RSM via this way. SR has about 80 volunteers working for them, coordinated by a board of 7 board members.

== International partner schools ==
RSM students can take part in study exchanges with other leading business schools around the world.

Partner schools include :

- In the USA: University of Chicago, New York University, Ross School of Business, Northwestern University, University of California, Berkeley, University of California, Los Angeles, Duke University, Emory University, UNC Kenan–Flagler Business School, University of Illinois at Urbana–Champaign, Marshall School of Business, McCombs School of Business, Kelley School of Business, Cornell University Samuel Curtis Johnson Graduate School of Management.
- In Canada: HEC Montréal, McGill University, University of British Columbia, University of Toronto, Schulich School of Business, Queen's School of Business, Darla Moore School of Business.
- In Asia: National University of Singapore, University of Hong Kong, Seoul National University, Yonsei University, Korea University, KAIST College of Business, Hong Kong University of Science and Technology, Peking University, Tsinghua University, Indian Institute of Management Ahmedabad, Management Development Institute, The Chinese University of Hong Kong, Shanghai Jiao Tong University, Keio University, Singapore Management University, National Taiwan University, Universitas Gadjah Mada.
- In Europe: HEC Paris, ESCP Business School, London School of Economics, Copenhagen Business School, SDA Bocconi School of Management, ESADE Business School, University of St. Gallen, WHU – Otto Beisheim School of Management, University of Warwick, Manchester Business School, BI Norwegian Business School, University College Dublin, IE Business School, Grenoble École de Management, Vienna University of Economics and Business, Stockholm School of Economics, IESE Business School, University of Economics, Prague, University of Cologne, Sciences Po Paris.
- In Latin America: Universidad Torcuato di Tella, Fundação Getúlio Vargas, Pontificia Universidad Católica de Chile, Instituto Tecnológico Autónomo de México, Instituto Tecnologico de Estudios Superiores Monterrey.
- In Oceania: The University of Melbourne, University of Sydney, University of New South Wales, University of Otago

== Distinguished alumni ==
Notable alumni of Rotterdam School of Management are awarded each year in the Distinguished Alumni Awards.

Name	Notability	Class
Boudewijn Beerkens	CFO, SHV Holdings	Full-time MBA 1991
Else Boutkan	Founder, Something Else	Part-time MBA 2002
Asthildur Margret Otharsdottir	Chairman of the board, Marel	Full-time MBA 1996
Maria van der Heijden	Founder of Women on Wings, owner of ComVerander	Part-time MSc Bedrijfskunde 2000
Hans Smits	CEO, Port of Rotterdam Authority (2005–2013), now President of the Board of Trustees, Erasmus University Rotterdam	Post-kandidaats Opleiding Bedrijfskunde 1973-1975
Saskia Stuiveling	President, Netherlands Court of Audit	Post-kandidaats Opleiding Bedrijfskunde 1970–1972
Alexander Ribbink	Partner, Prime Technology Ventures, formerly Executive Board Member and Chief Operating Officer of TomTom	Full-time MBA 1990
Bart Becht	Former CEO, Reckitt Benckiser	Post-kandidaats Opleiding Bedrijfskunde 1977–1980
Sukhbir Jasuja	CEO, ITpreneurs	Full-time MBA 1998
Johan H. Andresen Jr.	CEO, Ferd Norway	Full-time MBA 1993
Meiny Prins	CEO, Priva BV	Part-time Bedrijfskunde 2000
Hans van Ierland	Co-founder and CEO, Holland Private Equity	Full-time MBA 1990
Diederik Laman Trip	Former CEO, ING Netherlands	Doctorandus Post-kandidaats 1970
Feike Sijbesma	CEO, Royal DSM	Post-kandidaats Opleiding Bedrijfskunde 1987
Joost Notenboom and Michiel Roodenburg	Cycle for Water	MScBA 2009 and BScBA 2009 & MScBA 2010
Robert-Jan van Ogtrop	The Circle Economy	Doctoraal Post-kandidaats Bedrijfskunde 1980
Jente de Vries and Lisanne van Zwol	Founders, Kromkommer	Both MScBA 2012
Niels Van Deuren	Founder, HousingAnywhere	International Business Administration 2006

== See also ==
- Erasmus University Rotterdam
- STAR Study Association at Rotterdam School of Management, Erasmus University
- Erasmus Research Institute of Management (ERIM)
- CEMS
- Triple accreditation
