= HousingAnywhere =

Mid-term rental platform

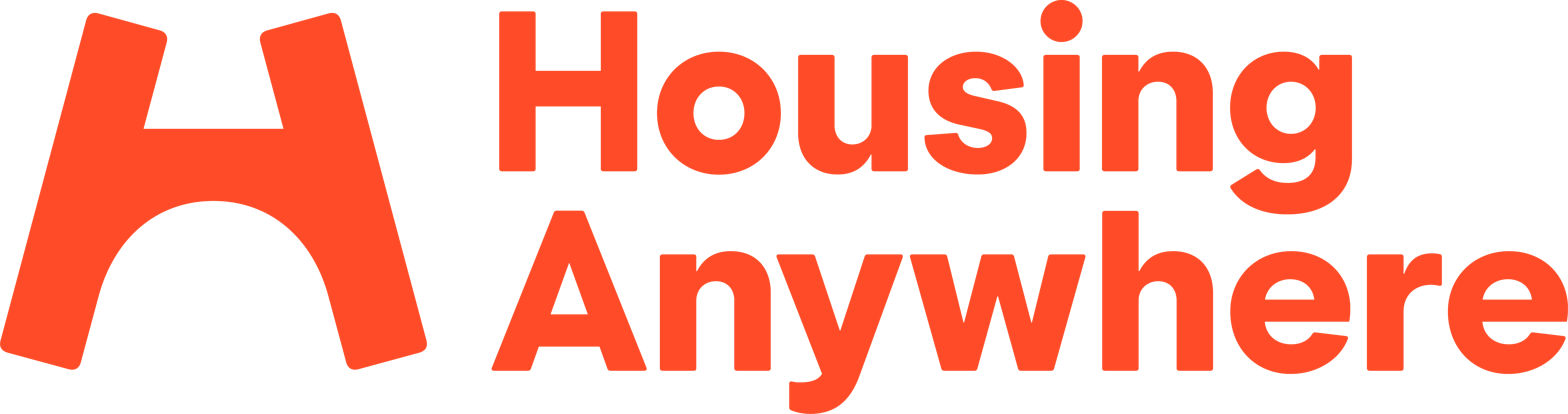
- Founded: 2009
- Founder: Niels Van Deuren
- Headquarters: Rotterdam, the Netherlands
- Area served: Europe, US
- Key people: Antonio Intini (CEO); Jim Bijwaard (COO); Sander van Der Putten (CPO)
- Services: Rental platform, online viewings, and bookings
- Website: housinganywhere.com

HousingAnywhere is a mid-term rental platform founded in 2009 and headquartered in Rotterdam, Netherlands. The company specializes in connecting international students and professionals with property providers, through its online platform, including booking and payment systems.

== History ==
In 2009, HousingAnywhere's founder Niels Van Deuren was pursuing a degree in International Business Administration at the Rotterdam School of Management, which included a semester exchange to the National University of Singapore. He then faced the challenges of finding a room in Singapore, and came up with the idea of HousingAnywhere. As a result, he established HousingAnywhere.com as a student-to-student messaging forum for room subletting. In the upcoming years, the platform expanded its services to other European countries, including Spain, France, Germany, and Denmark.

HousingAnywhere's business model was based on selling memberships to universities for a fee. Universities promoted the services on their own communication channels so that students could see the available accommodation for them. Students who had accommodation and were soon to embark on an exchange would advertise their properties on the platform, while interested students would respond with their requirements.

In 2014, the platform developed its own integrated booking system, which transformed a student-to-student messaging forum into a rental platform based on a booking model.

In 2015 HousingAnywhere secured initial funding in a seed round followed by a €5 million in a Series A funding round from venture capital firm henQ and Real Web, operator of immobiliare.it in 2017.

In 2017, it was recognized as the 4th most innovative company in the Netherlands and the 1st in Rotterdam by the Dutch Chamber of Commerce.

The company received €6 million in Series B funding led by Vostok New Ventures, along with existing investors Real Web and henQ in 2018.

HousingAnywhere raised €24 million in Series C funding, acquiring Kamernet to expand its presence in the Netherlands and other European countries in 2021.

In June 2023, HousingAnywhere expanded to key cities in the UK and the US. It also secured €8 million in debt financing from BNP Paribas in 2023.

In the Deloitte Tech Fast 50 ranking for the Netherlands, it secured the 21st position in 2023 and the 36th position in 2022. The company received recognition from DISQ in 2023, 2022, and 2021.

Acquisitions
#	Date	Company	Notes	Ref(s).
1	Aug 2012	HousingExchange.it	Italian platform for international students.	
2	June 2014	casaswap.com	Danish platform whereby students that go abroad for an exchange semester or internship can sublet their rooms.	
3	January 2020	Studenten-WG	German classifieds website with three million users, and 20,000 active listings.	
4	March 2020	Rentmate	Icelandic rental platform	
5	2021	StanzaZoo	Italian classifieds platform	
6	2021	Kamernet	Dutch student accommodation platform	
7	2022	Studapart (majority stake)	French student accommodation platform	

== Activities ==
HousingAnywhere is a mid-term rental platform, enabling international students and professionals to find homes abroad. The platform enables online viewings, bookings, and rent, and other fee collection through a payment system. It is headquartered in Rotterdam, and operates in 125 cities across US and Europe. It teams up with over 300 partner universities and, along with its sister brands Kamernet and Studapart, has over 30 million users yearly.

HousingAnywhere oversees three brands: HousingAnywhere, Kamernet (fully acquired), and Studapart (majority stake).

In 2023, Jim Bijwaard was appointed as COO and Erik Gruwel became CFO.

In March 2022, HousingAnywhere launched a dedicated housing platform to support displaced individuals affected by the Russian invasion of Ukraine.
