= Xcite Energy =

British oil company

Xcite Energy Ltd
- Type: Public
- Traded as: LSE: XEL
- Industry: Oil and gas
- Founded: 2004
- Headquarters: Guildford, United Kingdom
- Number of locations: 2 offices (2016)
- Area served: Europe
- Key people: Rupert E. Cole (CEO); Andrew Fairclough (CFO); Timothy S. Jones (Chairman)
- Products: Petroleum
- Total equity: $350.83 million
- Number of employees: 17
- Subsidiaries: Xcite Energy Resources plc
- Website: www.xcite-energy.com

Xcite Energy was an oil company based in the United Kingdom. The company's main asset is the Bentley Heavy Oil Field in the North Sea, although it also has a number of smaller assets included in License P.1979, located near to the Bentley Oil Field.

== Organisation ==
Its registered office is in the British Virgin Islands. Its corporate office is located in Guildford, Surrey and its operations office is located in Aberdeen, Scotland. It operates through a wholly owned subsidiary company Xcite Energy Resources PLC.

== History ==
Xcite Energy was created as Xcite Energy Resources Limited in 2002 with the goal of developing the Bentley Heavy Oil Field which had been discovered some 25 years earlier by Amoco. It became a subsidiary of a new British Virgin Islands corporation, Xcite Energy Limited, in 2007 and was subsequently listed on the AIM and TSX stock exchanges. The subsidiary changed from a private limited company to a public limited company in June 2014.

The company was awarded UKCS Block 9/3b containing the Bentley Heavy Oil Field in 2003. Additional licenses were awarded over Blocks 9/3c and 9/3d in the UK 26th Offshore Licensing Round in 2010 but were relinquished in January 2015, in accordance with their terms. A final license was awarded over Blocks 9/4 (part), 9/8b and 9/9f (split) in the UK 27th Offshore Licensing Round in 2012. This latter license is due to be farmed out to Azinor Catalyst Limited pending the result of a technical evaluation of the license area.

Richard Smith retired as CEO in August 2012 and was replaced by then-CFO Rupert Cole. Andrew Fairclough was promoted to CFO in February 2014, having worked for the company since August 2012, as Corporate Affairs Director. The current board chair is Timothy S. Jones, who replaced the previous chairman, Roger Ramshaw, in April 2014.

In May 2013, the company sold data to Statoil for $15 million. In May 2014, Xcite Energy signed a collaboration agreement with Statoil and Royal Dutch Shell, and a further collaboration agreement with Statoil and EnQuest in October 2014 to evaluate the potential utilisation of common gas import infrastructure between the companies oil fields. As of 30 June 2016, Xcite Energy had a market cap of 45.7 (GBP m) representing 309.93 million shares and unrestricted cash reserves of 7.36 (USD m).

The company was due to repay 139.05 (USD m) of bonds which fell due for repayment on 30 June 2016. The Company told shareholders at the previous AGM in Dublin that further finance for the company was being sought and the CFO confirmed to shareholders that he was in discussions about various, unspecified financial options to move the Company forward. The Company then announced on 16 June 2016 that they had requested an extension of bond maturity to 30 September 2016, which was granted at a bondholders meeting on 30 June 2016. The following day the three non-executive directors resigned and the Chief Operating Officer, Stephen Kew, stepped down from the company and Cole was removed from office. On the 27 September 2016 the Company issued a statement saying that negotiations were being concluded between the principal bondholders and the company for a so-called restructuring that would see the bondholders exchange 100% of the value of the outstanding bonds being exchanged for nearly all (98.5%) of the enlarged share capital of the company. The company warned that should the shareholders not support the proposed so-called restructuring the bondholder would likely pursue enforcement action against the company.

Private shareholders were vocal in their support to vote down the proposal, and on the 25 October 2016 the company announced that the bondholders were planning to instruct the Bond Trustee to petition the Court in the British Virgin Islands requesting the appointment of a liquidator to the company. As a consequence of this planned action the Directors of the company requested the immediate suspension of the trading on AIM of shares.

The petition to place the company into liquidation was heard by the Eastern Caribbean Supreme Court in the British Virgin Islands on 5 December 2016.

Xcite Energy was then liquidated. A shell Company, Whalsay Energy, was established by the bond holders to develop Xcite's sole asset the large undeveloped Bentley oil field and the OGA agreed to extend the development licence. Whalsay thereafter failed to exploit the oilfield and in July 2021 Enquest acquired the field from them for a nominal sum with the possibility of further sums being paid to Whalsay if any revenues came to Enquest from Bentley in the future. The Bentley field remains undeveloped by Enquest.

== Reserves ==
The company owns a 100% stake in the Bentley Heavy Oil Field, License P.1078 (block 9/3b) and a 100% stake in License P.1979 (blocks 9/4a, 9/8b and 9/9h). These latter blocks contain four prospects, Chadwick, Cartwright, Camm and Clement, that are currently the subject of a detailed technical evaluation being carried out by Azinor Catalyst. Under the terms of the license agreement license P.1979 is due to be relinquished at the end of 2016 unless the license requirements for drill-or-drop have been fulfilled prior to that date.

An reserves assessment report evaluates the amount of recoverable oil (1P, 2P, 3P) in the first and second stage production areas and its net asset value. The most recent statement of reserves data, dated 17 March 2016, shows the probabilistic forecast of mean petroleum initially-in-place for the Bentley field of 880.9 million barrels (140,050,000 m^{3}), with 1P, 2P, and 3P oil reserves for the Bentley field of 235.9 million barrels (37,510,000 m^{3}), 267.3 million barrels (42,500,000 m^{3}), and 298.0 million barrels (47,380,000 m^{3}) respectively, based on an initial 35 year production period. The NPV10 valuation (after tax) was stated as approximately $2.1 billion, $2.5 billion and $2.9 billion on a 1P, 2P, and 3P basis respectively.

The company delisted from the London Stock Exchange on 28 November 2016 following on from the resignation of its nominated advisor on the 28 October 2016.

== Liquidation ==
The bondholders took control of the company and closed it down. The companies assets were liquidated in 2017 by a British Virgin Islands insolvency court and sold to Whalsay Energy a private company for $1.
