= Ferd (company) =

Norwegian holding company

Ferd Holding
- Company type: Private
- Industry: Holding
- Founded: 2001; 25 years ago
- Headquarters: Bærum, Norway
- Area served: Norway
- Key people: Johan H. Andresen Jr. (chairman)
- Revenue: ▲NOK 19,364 million (2017)
- Operating income: NOK 1,192 million (2017)
- Net income: NOK 1,096 million (2017)
- Total equity: NOK 24,926 million (2017)
- Owner: Katharina and Alexandra Andresen
- Number of employees: 75
- Subsidiaries: Swix; Elopak
- Website: https://ferd.no

Ferd is a Norwegian holding company which holds partial ownership in companies within industry and finance as well as a real estate portfolio. The company has 75 employees and is owned by Johan H. Andresen and his two daughters Katharina and Alexandra; it was established in 2001. The group also has several venture and private equity holdings.

The company's name Ferd is a Norwegian word meaning journey.

== Business ==
The company operates in several business areas including:

- Ferd Capital and Ferd Invest, an investor in private and public companies in Norway making investments from the company's balance sheets
- Ferd External Managers, a fund of funds making investments in hedge funds, private equity funds and mutual funds
- Ferd Real Estate, manages approximately 70,000 square meters of real estate

== History ==
The company was founded in 2001, when Tiedemanns-Joh. H. Andresen DA and Hartog & Co AS were merged to form the current Ferd AS. The company's history dates back to 1849, when the Andresen family acquired J. L. Tiedemanns Tobaksfabrik, a tobacco factory. The original tobacco company was sold to Skandinavisk Tobakskompagni in 1998.

== Ownership ==
Ferd's portfolio consists, among others, of the private holdings in:

- Swix
- Elopak
- Mestergruppen
- Interwell
- Aibel
- mnemonic
- Servi Group
- Fürst Medisinske Laboratorium
- Infotjenester Group
- Desenio AB
- Fjordline
- General Oceans
- Brim Explorer
