= Elopak =

Norwegian company

Elopak is a Norwegian company producing cartons for liquids, starting with aseptic gable top cartons for milk. The company was founded in 1957 by Johan Henrik Andresen and Christian August Johansen as a European licensee of Pure-Pak, the Elopak name standing for European License Of PURE-PAK. In 1987, Elopak bought the Ex-Cell-O Packaging Systems Division from which it was originally a licensee, and hence got full ownership of Pure-Pak.

The CEO of the company was Bjørn Flatgård from 1996 until his resignation in 2007. The current CEO is Thomas Körmendi. Körmendi joined the company in 2018.

In 2003 the company had some 2500 employees and a revenue of about 4 billion Norwegian Kroner, and is the world's third largest supplier of packaging for beverages.

All production now takes place outside Norway. It is instead produced in Finland. The company's headquarters are in Spikkestad.

The company is currently owned by the investment company Ferd AS.
