= Hertel Wax =

American company

Hertel Wax is an American company which produces ski wax, snowboard wax, skate wax and related accessories. The company is owned by Terry Hertel and is based in Sunnyvale, California.

Terry Hertel founded the company in California in 1972. Hertel Wax was the first producer of all-temperature ski and snowboard waxes. The company’s approach was involved micro-encapsulate tiny water-soluble surfactants into the wax.

The company holds a patent on the first fluorocarbon waxes, introduced in 1986.
