= Aibel =

Norwegian energy service company

Aibel AS
- Company type: Private
- Industry: Petroleum
- Founded: 2007; 19 years ago
- Headquarters: Stavanger, Norway
- Key people: Mads Andersen (president and CEO); Jan Skogseth (former CEO)
- Products: Maintenance and modifications onshore and offshore, field development, renewable energy
- Number of employees: 4000 (2019)
- Parent: Ratos (32 %), Sjätte AP-fonden (18 %) and Ferd Capital (50 %)
- Website: www.aibel.com

Aibel AS /ˈeɪbəl/ is a service company within the oil, gas and offshore wind industries. The company provides engineering, construction, modifications and maintenance through a project's life cycle.

== About Aibel ==
Aibel has more than 4000 employees who design, build, maintain and upgrade oil and gas production facilities. The company works with new and existing facilities onshore and offshore. Aibel is currently present at approx. half of the offshore installations on the Norwegian Continental Shelf, at three onshore facilities in Norway and delivers a wide range of services to operators all over the world; ranging from concept development, studies and field developments to modifications and maintenance of oil and gas installations.

Aibel’s headquarter is situated in Stavanger. The company also has engineering offices in Asker, Bergen, Harstad, Hammerfest and Haugesund. The company also has two major yards; one in Haugesund, Norway (former HMV) and one in Laem Chabang, Thailand.

== Operations ==
About half of Aibel’s employees are engaged with maintenance, modification and operating services at existing oil and gas facilities on the Norwegian Continental Shelf. The company has several large, long-term maintenance and modification frame agreements. In addition, Aibel delivers stand-alone modification projects, which include new modules.

The company develop concepts for e.g. onshore production facilities, FPSO's (Floating Production Storage and Offloading) and fixed platforms. Being a turnkey supplier, Aibel offers its clients the full range of services, including studies, project management, engineering, procurement, fabrication, installation, commissioning and completion.

In August 2011, Aibel was awarded a major contract with ABB for the design and development of the DolWin beta platform for a major offshore wind park off the coast of Germany. The platform will receive alternating current from wind parks and convert it into direct current before sending it onshore via subsea cables. The platform left Aibel’s yard in Haugesund August 2014. In February 2015, Aibel won the contract for the engineering, procurement and construction of the drilling platform for the Johan Sverdrup field. The construction work is now underway at the company’s yards in Haugesund and Thailand and at partner Nymo's yard at Grimstad, Norway.

== History ==
As a trademark and company name, Aibel is relatively new, but the company can look back at over a hundred years of history through companies such as the Electrical Bureau (EB), Haugesund Mekaniske Verksted (HMV), ABB and Umoe. The company has been involved in the development of the oil and gas industry ever since oil was first discovered under the North Sea. Today, Aibel is an independent company owned by the investment companies Ferd (50 percent), Ratos (32 percent) and the Sixt AP Funds (18 percent). In addition, Aibel owns 40 percent of the Deeline Construction Company, outside Pattaya, Thailand and 50 percent of the EMC (Egyptian Maintenance Company), in Cairo.

In recent years, Aibel has become a leading service company also within the offshore wind industry.

== See also ==
- List of oilfield service companies
