= Swix =

Manufacturing company of winter sports equipment

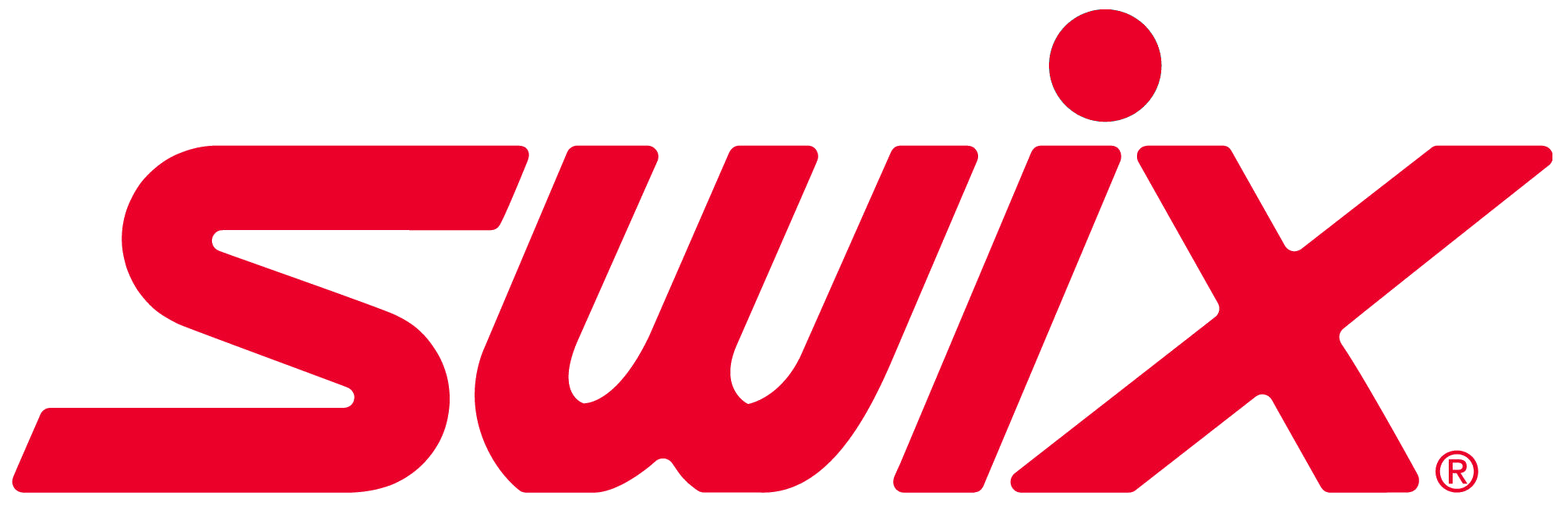
- Industry: Sports equipment
- Founded: 1946; 80 years ago in Sweden
- Founder: Börje Gabrielsson
- Headquarters: Lillehammer, Norway
- Products: Ski wax, ski poles, sportswear
- Number of employees: 101 (2026)
- Parent: Ferd AS
- Website: swixsport.com

Swix is a Norwegian manufacturing company of winter sports equipment, headquartered in Lillehammer. Range of products by Swix include ski wax, ski poles and sportswear. The company is owned by the investment company Ferd AS.

The company was founded in Sweden in 1946 by Börje Gabrielsson, based on experience with ski wax by Swedish skier Martin Matsbo. Swix was the first producer of modern ski wax, and had a scientific approach to the challenge. The wax was colour-coded according to type, a practice that has since been adopted by the entire ski wax industry. Production was in Skåne in Sweden and in Fjellhamar near Oslo, Norway. By 1964 all production had been moved to Norway. In 1974, Swix bought Liljedahls Skistavfabrikk in Lillehammer, bringing the brand under the Swix name and becoming a leading ski pole manufacturer. Swix was bought by Ferd in 1978. In 1989, Swix bought Norheim, which was once owned by Gresvig AS, and has since been expanding into the technical sportswear market.

Toko, founded by Jakob Tobler in 1916 in Altstätten, Switzerland as "Tobler & Co.", was bought in 2010, and renamed Toko-Swix Sport AG.

In 2018, Swix Sport Group changed its name to BRAV. The new name is not consumer-facing, but serves internally to unite the company's multiple brands.

== Gallery ==
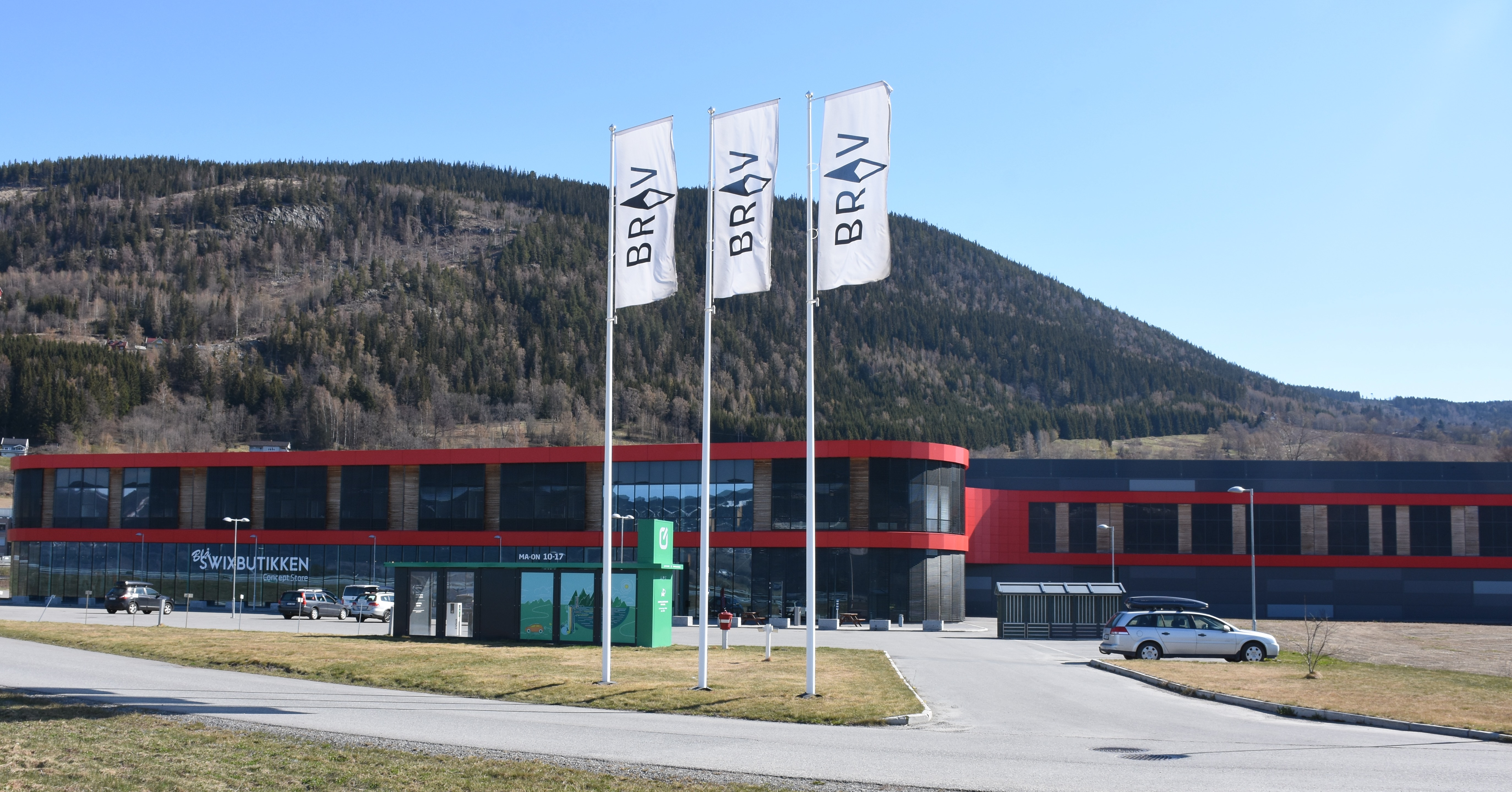
Swix headquartered in Lillehammer.

Mid-to-late 20th-century Swix manual ski waxing iron.
