= Torp (surname) =

Torp is a surname. Notable people with the surname include:

- Alf Torp (1853–1916), Norwegian philologist
- Ane Dahl Torp (born 1975), Norwegian actress
- Arne Torp (born 1942), Norwegian professor
- Carl-Erik Torp (born 1984), Norwegian association footballer
- Else Torp (born 1968), Danish soprano
- Ernst Torp (1900–1988), Norwegian architect
- Fredrik Torp (born 1937), Norwegian architect
- Harald Torp (1890–1972), Norwegian journalist and politician
- Jette Torp (born 1964), Danish singer
- Leif Torp (1897–1991), Norwegian architect
- Linn Torp (born 1977), Norwegian cyclist
- Maren Bolette Torp (1876–1989), Norwegian supercentenarian
- Martin Torp (born 1992), Norwegian association footballer
- Nichlas Torp (born 1989), Swedish hockey player
- Nikolaj Torp Larsen (born 1973), Danish musician
- Niels A. Torp (born 1940), Norwegian architect, owner of the architectural firm Niels Torp AS
- Oscar Torp (1893–1958), former Prime Minister of Norway
- Reidar Torp (1922–2017), Norwegian soldier
- Trine Torp (born 1970), Danish politician
- Victor Torp (born 1999), Danish association footballer

== See also ==
- Anisette Torp-Lind (born 1971), Danish figure skater
