= Nils August Andresen Butenschøn =

Norwegian businessperson

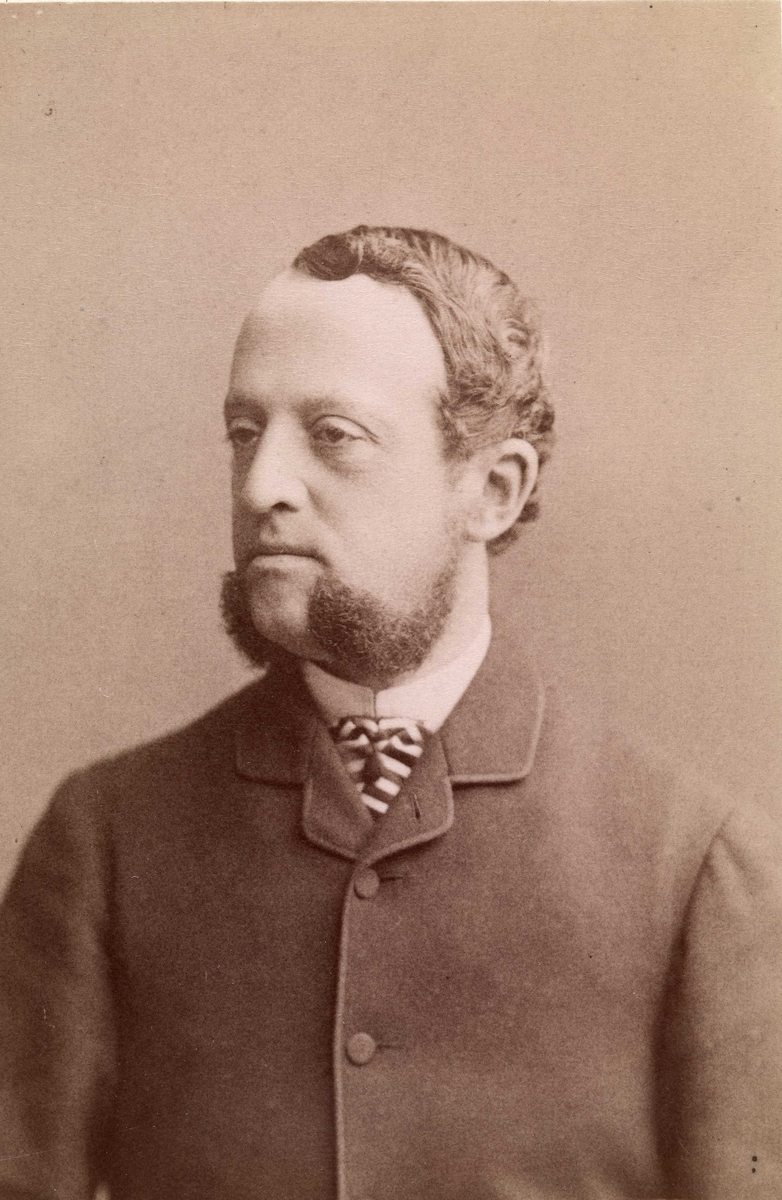
Nils August Andresen Butenschøn ca. 1880

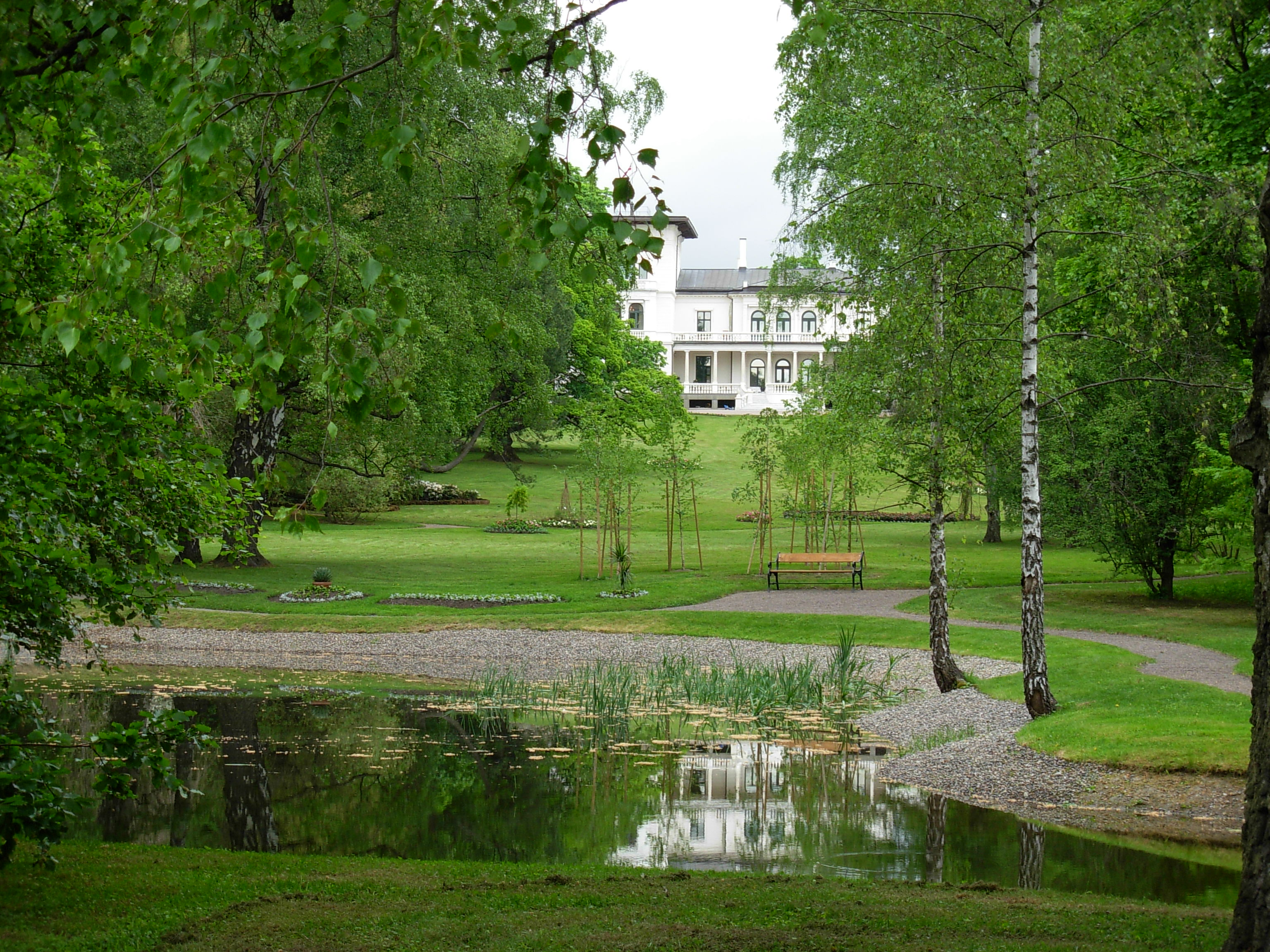
Søndre Skøyen at Skøyenparken

Nils August Andresen Butenschøn (3 February 1842 – 27 September 1935) was a Norwegian businessperson.

He was born in Kristiania (now Oslo, Norway) as the only son of banker Nicolay August Andresen (1812–1894) and Nilsine Augusta Butenschøn (1818–1842). He was a grandson of Nicolai Andresen and grandnephew of Johan Henrik Andresen. His forefathers had founded and run a banking company later named Andresens Bank. In 1893, he took his mother's surname, Butenschøn.

He joined the company in 1867, as a junior partner of his father and his uncle Engelhart Andresen. They died in 1894 and 1896 respectively, but from 1892 Butenschøn was a partner with his cousins Carl Christian and Engelhart Jr (the latter left in 1902). Butenschøn spent his career as a chief executive in Andresens Bank, and also served as a consul general. He was decorated as a Knight, First Class of the Order of St. Olav and a Commander of the Order of the Crown of Italy.

Dating to the 1860s, his father had been the owner and developer of Skøyen Manor (Sondre Skoyen) which he inherited. This estate was located in the neighborhood of Skøyen and is today the site of Skøyenparken, a residential park in Oslo. In 1871, he married Hanna Døderlein. They had the son Barthold A. Butenschøn, who married Mabel Plahte, a daughter of Frithjof M. Plahte; through them Nils August was a grandfather of Barthold A. Butenschøn, Jr. His son became a company partner in 1910, and by that time there were two additional partners as well; Herbert and Viktor Plahte, two brothers of Mabel Plahte.
