= Christian Wilhelm Andresen =

Norwegian judge

- Born: 13 June 1811; Christiania, Norway
- Died: 28 October 1886 (aged 75)
- Occupation: Judge
- Parent: Nicolai Andresen
- Relatives: Nicolay August Andresen (brother); Johan Henrik Andresen (brother)

Christian Wilhelm Andresen (13 June 1811 – 28 October 1886) was a Norwegian judge.

He was born in Christiania to merchant Nicolai Andresen and Engel Johanne Christiane Reichborn. He graduated as cand.jur. in 1832, and was named as a Supreme Court Justice from 1859 to 1883 (acting from 1855). He was decorated as Knight of the Order of St. Olav in 1860, and as Commander in 1873.
