= Plahte =

Plahte is a Norwegian surname. Notable people with the surname include:

- Frithjof M. Plahte (1836–1899), Norwegian merchant
- Viktor Plahte (1878–1965), Norwegian businessman

== See also ==
- Plate (surname)
