= Johan Henrik Andresen =

Johan Henrik Andresen or Johan H. Andresen may refer to:

- Johan Henrik Andresen (1815–1874), Norwegian merchant, factory owner
- Johan H. Andresen (1888–1953), Norwegian industrialist and politician, grandson of above
- Johan Henrik Andresen (1930–2011), Norwegian businessman, son of above
- Johan H. Andresen Jr. (born 1961), Norwegian businessman, son of above
