= Barthold A. Butenschøn Sr. =

Norwegian businessperson (1877–1971)

Hans Barthold Andresen Butenschøn (27 December 1877 – 28 November 1971) was a Norwegian businessperson.

He was born in Kristiania as a son of Nils August Andresen Butenschøn and Hanna Butenschøn, and grandson of Nicolay Andresen. Together with Mabel Anette Plahte (1877–1973, a daughter of Frithjof M. Plahte) he had the son Hans Barthold Andresen Butenschøn Jr. and was through him the father-in-law of Ragnhild Butenschøn and grandfather of Peter Butenschøn. Through his daughter Marie Claudine he was the father-in-law of Joakim Lehmkuhl, through his daughter Mabel Anette he was the father-in-law of Harald Astrup (a son of Sigurd Astrup) and through his daughter Nini Augusta he was the father-in-law of Ernst Torp.

He took commerce school and agricultural school. He was hired in the family company N. A. Andresen & Co, and became a co-owner in 1910. He eventually became chief executive officer. The bank changed its name to Andresens Bank in 1913 and merged with Bergens Kreditbank in 1920. The merger was dissolved later in the 1920s. He was also a landowner, owning Nedre Skøyen farm and a lot of land in Enebakk. He chaired the board of Nydalens Compagnie from 1926, having not been a board member before that.

He also chaired the supervisory council of Forsikringsselskapet Viking and Nedre Glommen salgsforening, and was a supervisory council member of Filharmonisk Selskap. He was a member of the gentlemen's club SK Fram since 1890, and was proclaimed a lifetime member in 1964.

He was buried in Enebakk.

Business positions
Preceded by Magnus Blikstad	Chairman of Nydalens Compagnie; 1926–	Succeeded by
