= Niels A. Torp =

Norwegian architect (born 1940)

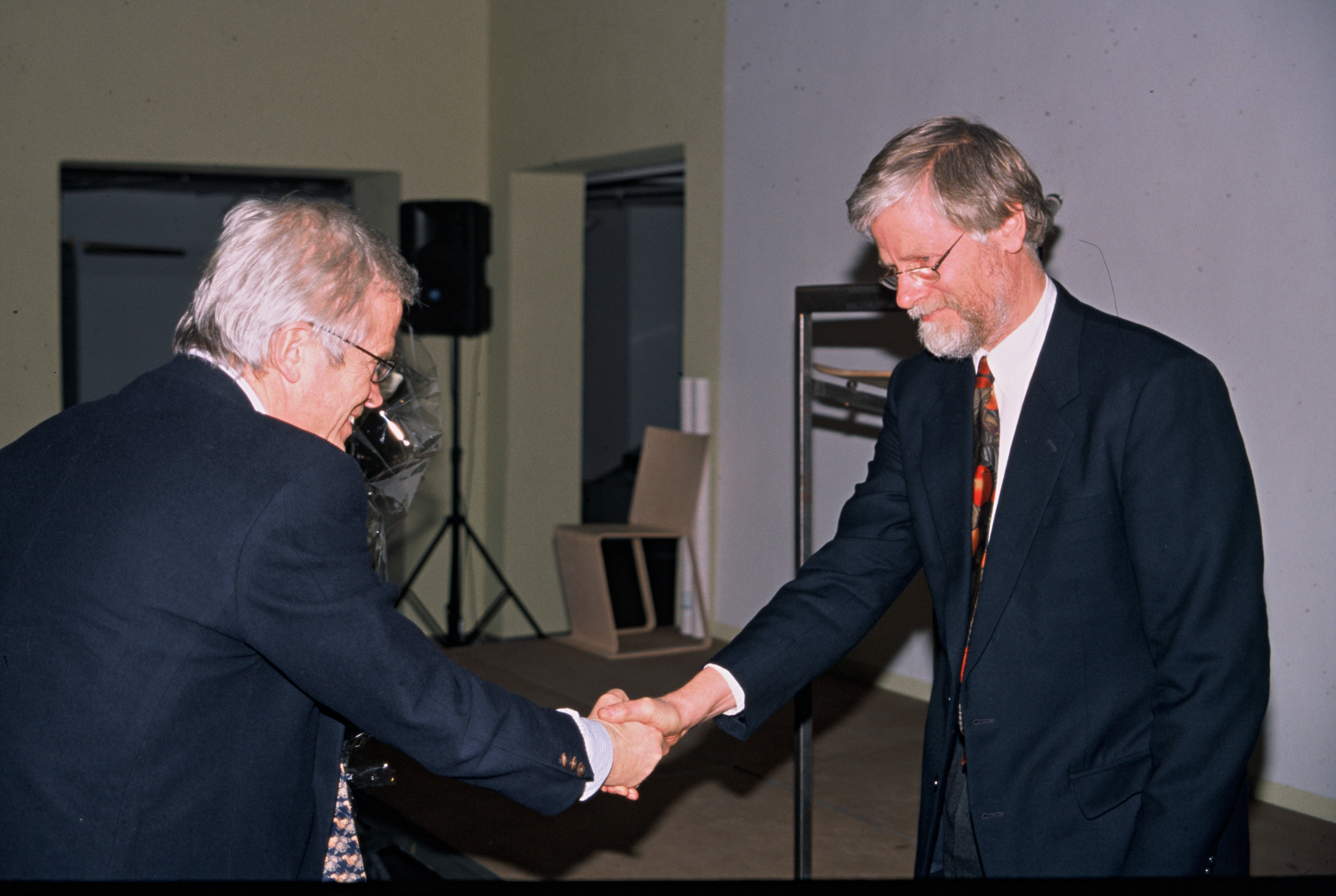
- Torp (left) receives the Jacob Award for 1999 from Peter Butenschøn.
- Born: 8 March 1940 (age 85); Oslo, Norway
- Occupation: Architect

Niels August Torp (born 8 March 1940) is a Norwegian architect.

He was born in Oslo to architect Ernst Torp and Nini Augusta Butenschøn. He is a brother of Fredrik Torp, and nephew of Leif Torp and Barthold A. Butenschøn.

Torp was appointed at his father and uncle's architect company Torp & Torp from 1965, and took over as leader of the company from 1974. He renamed the company to Niels Torp AS in 1984. Among his designs are offices for the companies Norsk Data, Noiseless and Fellesdata in Oslo, British Airways main office at Heathrow, the BI Norwegian Business School main campus in Oslo, parts of Aker Brygge, Smestaddammen, Vikingskipet and the Oslo Airport, Gardermoen terminal building.
