= Torp =

Torp may refer to:

== People ==
- Torp (surname), a list of people

== Places ==
- Torp, Iran, a village in East Azerbaijan Province
- Torp Court District, an administrative region of Sweden
- Torp, a place in the Norwegian municipality Fredrikstad, Østfold county, Norway
- Torp, a place in the Norwegian municipality Sandefjord, Vestfold county, Norway
- Torp, a village in the Swedish municipality Borgholm, Sweden
- Torp or Torps, a hamlet in Villers-Canivet, Normandy, France
- Torp, a former French commune, now part of the commune Le Torp-Mesnil, Normandy, France

== Other uses ==
- Torp (architecture), a small rural dwelling and agricultural unit in Scandinavia, similar to a croft
- Sandefjord Airport, Torp, shortened to Torp, Sandefjord, Norway
- Torp Station, a railway station near Sandefjord Airport
- Total ossicular replacement prosthesis (TORP), an inner-ear prosthesis
- Farman F.60 Torp, a French biplane airliner and bomber introduced in 1919

== See also ==
- Torpe (disambiguation)
- Torpes (disambiguation)
- Le Torpt
