= Leif Torp =

Norwegian architect (1897–1991)

- Born: 1 January 1897; Oslo, Norway
- Died: 15 April 1991 (aged 94); Oslo
- Occupation: Architect

Leif Torp (1 January 1897 – 15 April 1991) was a Norwegian architect.

== Biography ==
Torp was born in Kristiania (now Oslo), Norway. He was the son of Hjalmar Torp (1856-1922) and his wife Marie Fredrikke Severine Vaumund (1859-1946). He was a brother of architect Ernst Torp and the uncle of his sons architects, Fredrik Torp and Niels A. Torp.

He attended Statens håndverks- og kunstindustriskole (now Oslo National Academy of the Arts) during 1915 and 1920 – 21. During the studies he was assistant at the architects Morgenstierne & Eide in Kristiania 1920 – 21. He conducted engineering studies at the Royal Danish Academy of Fine Arts (Det Kongelige Danske Kunstakademi) in Copenhagen during 1923 followed by an architectural degree in 1924. He also conducted study trips to Italy, Germany and France.

After his studies, he was employed as building adviser at Gamlehjem Oslo 1924–25. Together with his brother Ernst, Torp ran the architect company Torp & Torp from 1930. He designed a number of buildings and neighbourhoods in Oslo. These included Briskebyhagen (1926) and Nobels gate 11 (1929), and along with his brother, Torstedgården, Ingar Nilsens løkke at Skøyen, Stensbergløkken, Hoff terrasse, and Kong Oscars Minde. He also designed Møllerhøvik (Bærum) and Wrightegården (Langesund).

The architectural firm continued in 1984 as Niels Torp AS Architects MNAL. Niels A. Torp was the son of Ernst Torp and had been employed by Torp & Torp since 1965. Another son, Fredrik Torp, also worked for the company before joining Telje Torp Aasen Arkitektkontor AS in 1965.
