= Skøyenparken =

Park in Oslo, Norway

Coordinates: 59°55′35″N 10°41′19″E

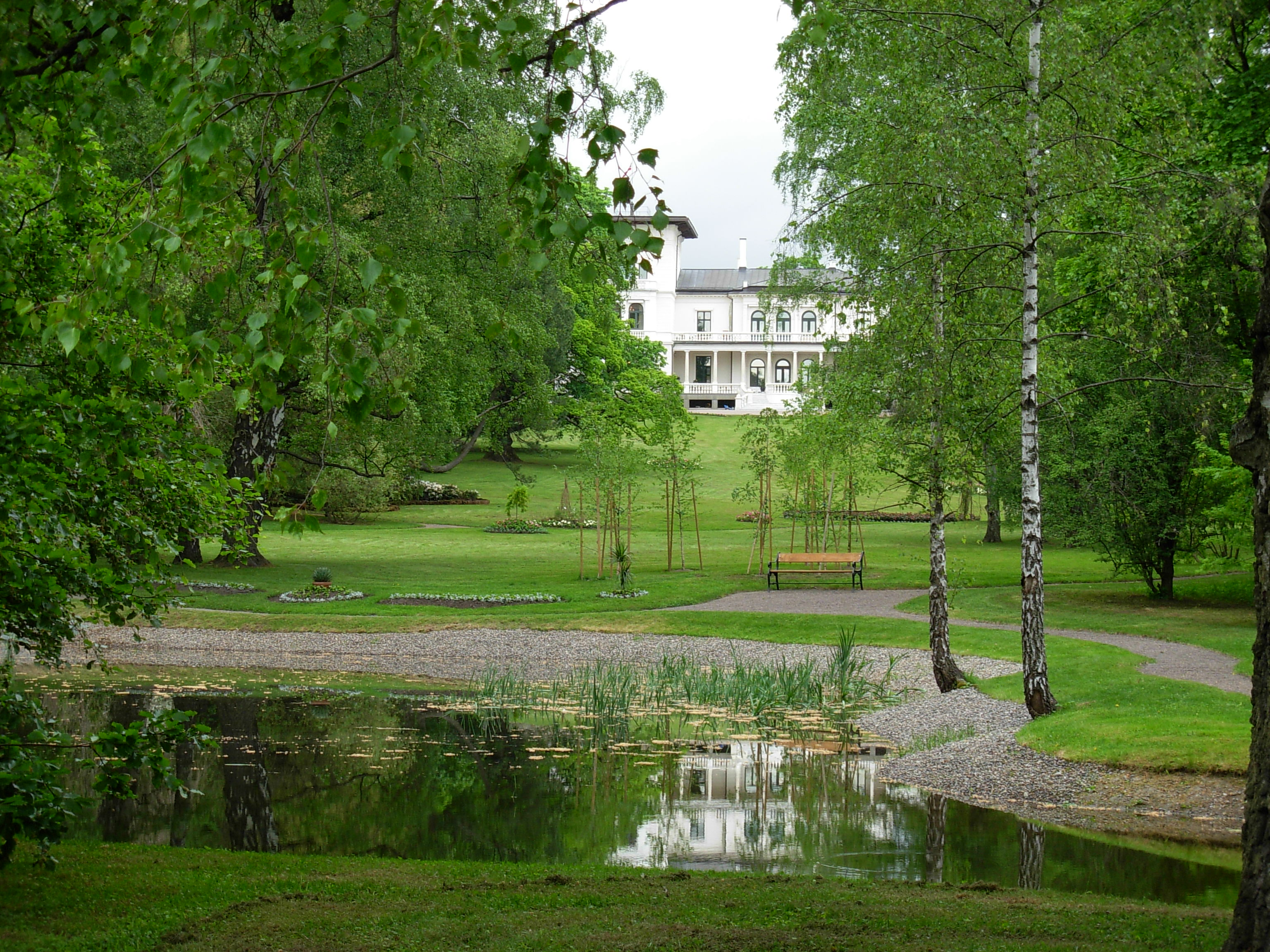
Skøyenparken

Skøyenparken is a park in the neighborhood of Skøyen in the borough of Ullern in Oslo, Norway.

The park belongs to Skøyen Manor (Søndre Skøyen), which lies adjacent to it. The middle section of the park is fenced and private. The outer parts are publicly accessible, including the park's forest with elm, oak and ash trees, and a nature park with walking paths. The park was built in the 1860s, under the orders of banker Nicolay August Andresen (1812-1894), the owner of Skøyen Manor. The pond in the park has obtained the popular name "Butensjøen", after Consul General Nils August Andresen Butenschøn (1842-1935), who owned the estate later in the century.
