= Torpes =

Torpes may refer to:

- Torpes of Pisa, early Christian martyr
- Torpes, Doubs, a commune in the French region of Franche-Comté
- Torpes, Saône-et-Loire a commune in the French region of Bourgogne

== See also ==
- Torpe (disambiguation)
- Torp (disambiguation)
