= Barthold A. Butenschøn =

Norwegian banker and book publisher

Hans Barthold Andresen Butenschøn (1 July 1904 – 6 August 2001) was a Norwegian banker and book publisher.

== Personal life ==
He was born in Enebakk as a son of landowner Hans Barthold Andresen Butenschøn Sr. (1877–1971) and Mabel Anette Plahte (1877–1973). He grew up at Bjerke Bruk in Enebakk and at the farm Nedre Skøyen. He was a paternal grandson of Nils and Hanna Butenschøn and paternal great-grandson of Nicolay Andresen. On the maternal side he was a grandson of Frithjof M. Plahte and a nephew of Herbert, Viktor and Erik Plahte.

In 1936 he married sculptor Ragnhild Jakhelln. They had the sons Hans Barthold, Peter and Nils Butenschøn. Through his sister Marie Claudine he was a brother-in-law of Joakim Lehmkuhl, through a sister Mabel Anette he was a brother-in-law of Harald Astrup and through another sister Nini Augusta he was a brother-in-law of Ernst Torp.

== Career ==
He finished his secondary education in 1924 and graduated from the Royal Frederick University with the cand.oecon. degree in 1928. He chaired the Norwegian Students' Society in the autumn of 1927. He was hired in the family company Andresens Bank in 1929, and spent time abroad in Germany in 1928 and London from 1932 to 1934. During his banking career he wrote the book Symmetallism in 1936.

From 1941 to 1942 he ran the publishing house Forenede Forlag. He was the director of publishing house Dreyers Forlag from 1942 to 1979. Dreyers published intellectual periodicals such as Spektrum, but also bought Alle menns blad and started a subsidiary Romanforlaget for "lighter literature". From 1954 Halfdan Kielland was a partner in the company, and in 1967 it became a limited company. It was sold to Grøndahl & Søn in 1991. Since 1985, Butenschøn had been co-owner of a new, small publishing house; Butenschøn & Andresen.

Butenschøn was a board member of the Norwegian Publishers' Association from 1960 to 1969, serving the last year as deputy chair. He also chaired Akershus Slotts Venner and was a board member of Selskapet til utgivelse av gamle norske håndskrifter, Oslo City Museum, Christiania Seildugsfabrik, Nydalens Compagnie, Hjula Veverier and Christiania Portland Cementfabrik and chaired the supervisory council of Forsikringsselskapet Viking. He was a member of the gentlemen's club SK Fram since 1961.

He lived at Bjerke Bruk in Enebakk from 1946, and was a member of Enebakk municipal council from 1960 to 1963. He wrote several local historical books and chaired the committee that published Enebakk bygdebok. He chaired the association of local history from 1965 to 1987 and received the municipality's cultural prize in 1993. He was decorated as a Knight, First Class of the Order of St. Olav in 1967, and died on 6 August 2001 in Enebakk.
