= Viktor Plahte =

Norwegian businessperson

Viktor Møinichen Plahte
- Born: 24 May 1878
- Died: 1965 (aged 86–87)
- Occupation: Businessperson

Viktor Møinichen Plahte (24 May 1878 – 1965) was a Norwegian businessperson.

== Early years ==
He was a son of Frithjof M. Plahte (1836–1899) and Marie, née Birch (1852–1937). He was a brother of Herbert and Erik Plahte, and an uncle of Frithjof M. Plahte Jr. and Hans Barthold Andresen Butenschøn Jr. His father had settled at Høvik in Bærum and Viktor lived there. He was, however, born in Surrey and took practical business training in England as well as in Sweden. He also attended Oslo Commerce School.

== Career ==
He became a partner in the bank N. A. Andresen & Co in 1902, together with his brother Herbert. The other three partners were Nils August Andresen Butenschøn, Carl Christian Andresen, and, from 1910, Hans Barthold Andresen Butenschøn. The bank changed its name to Andresens Bank in 1913 and merged with Bergens Kreditbank in 1920. The merger was dissolved later that decade. Plahte sat as co-owner and bank director from 1912 to 1923. He also founded Christiania Portland Cementfabrik, together with Donato Brambani.

He chaired the Norwegian Bankers' Association from 1919 to 1921, as well as Christiania Portland Cementfabrik. He was a board member of Egeberg Brug, Skedsmo Dampsag og Høvleri, Nydalens Compagnie, Meråker Brug, and Norsk Skibs-Hypothekbank. He chaired the supervisory council member of Forsikringsaktieselskabet Norden and was a supervisory council member of Filharmonisk Selskap. He was a member of the gentlemen's club SK Fram since 1902, and was proclaimed a lifetime member in 1964.

There is a road in Bærum named Viktor Plahtes vei. However, it is named after Viktor's son, Viktor Plahte, born in 1911, who died as an Allied pilot during the Second World War.
