= Torpe =

Torpe may refer to:

Places

- Torpe county in Sweden, see List of hundreds of Sweden
- Torpè, Sardinia, Italy

People

- Johannes Torpe, Danish musician, see Artificial Funk

== See also ==
- Torpes (disambiguation)
- Torp (disambiguation)
