= Frithjof M. Plahte =

Norwegian merchant and landowner

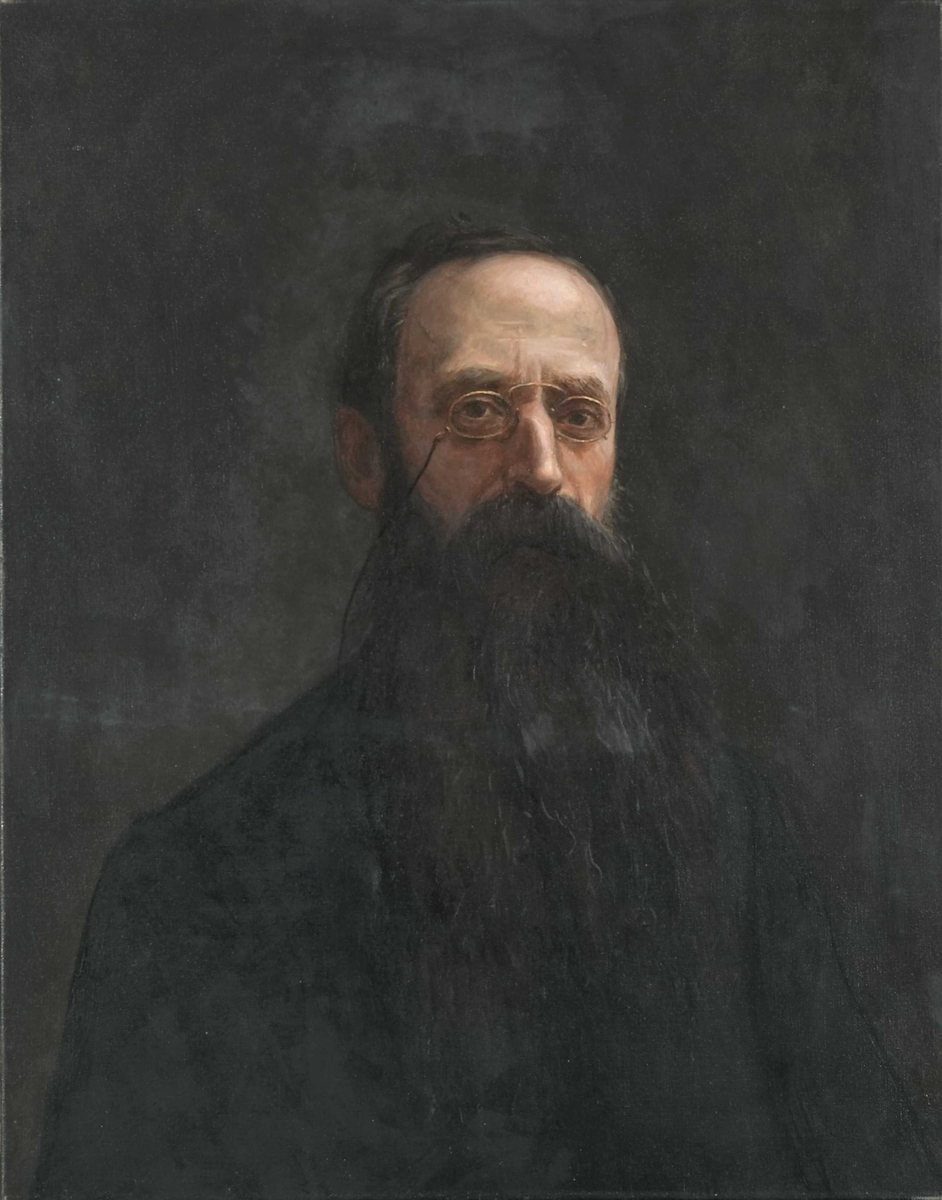
- Portrait from the Oslo Museum

Frithjof Møinichen Plahte (8 February 1836 – 17 July 1899) was a Norwegian merchant and landowner. After a career in the timber business, he settled in Bærum where he invested in business and in several farms. His family socialized within the upper echelon in the capital city region, and he stood behind the establishment of Høvik Church and the use of Fleskum farm by a group of painters.

== Early life and career ==
Through his mother's lineage he was a first cousin of Erika (Nissen), Ida and Thomasine Lie, and a nephew of Erik Røring Møinichen. Thomasine married a cousin on the paternal side, famous writer Jonas Lie, and they had the son Michael Strøm Lie who would become Frithjof Plahte's son-in-law.

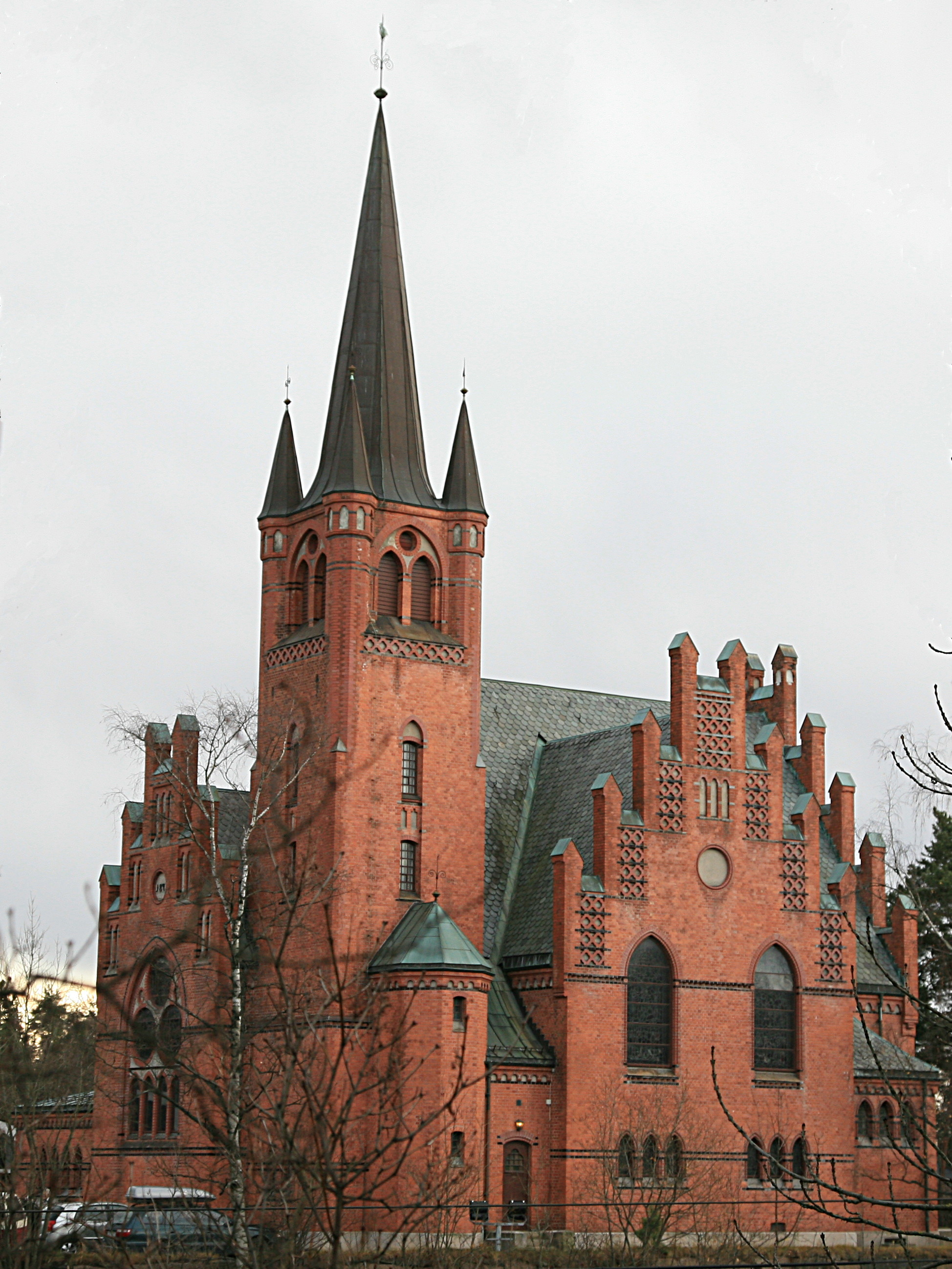
Høvik Church.

Frithjof Plahte lived in England as a timber merchant for several years, and some of his children were born there. In 1876 he bought the farm Nordre Høvik in Bærum. Here he modernized the farming, and around 1890 he moved the buildings somewhat. He gave off land for Høvik Church, and other portions of his property were separated out as well. He bought the farm Fleskum in 1885. He invested in local business such as Sandvikens Kalkfabrik og Teglverk and Brønøens Kalkfabrik; the latter sparked a prolonged family involvement at Brønnøya. He was also a board member of Nydalens Compagnie from 1896 to his death. He died in July 1899.

== Family and social life ==
Together with Margaret Ann "Annie" Wade he had the daughter Maggie Plahte (1863–1955). Annie died around 1870. From 1882 to 1898 Maggie was married to painter Christian Skredsvig; later to Michael Strøm Lie (a son of Frithjof's cousin Thomasine). Some years after marrying Skredsvig, Frithjof turned over Fleskum farm to her as a gift. It was turned into a social hub for painters, and the social life was especially vivid in 1886 and 1887. Several painters lived on the farm in periods. The stay at Fleskum directly influenced the career of Skredsvig, who painted Seljefløiten.

Some years after losing his first wife, Frithjof Plahte married Marie Birch (1852–1937). They had several children. A daughter named Marie died from tuberculosis in 1898; this led her mother to donate funds for the reconvalescence institution Marie Plahtes Minde, which still exists. The only surviving daughter Mabel Anette (1877–1973) married Hans Barthold Andresen Butenschøn, a son of Hanna and Nils August Andresen Butenschøn and father of Hans Barthold Andresen Butenschøn Jr. The three sons were Herbert, Viktor and Erik Plahte. Herbert had the son Frithjof M. Plahte Jr.

During Plahte's days, the family led an active social life in the Oslo region. They participated in balls at Bogstad Manor, Frogner Manor and in the social club Balselskabet Foreningen, where King Oscar II of Norway and Sweden was involved. The year after Frithjof Plahte died, his household was registered in the census as having several servants; Otto Haug who administered the farm, three housemaids, a cook, a coachman, three male farm helpers, a milkmaid, a welder and a childkeeper, in addition to some family members of these employees.
