= Nicolay August Andresen =

Norwegian banker (1812–1894)

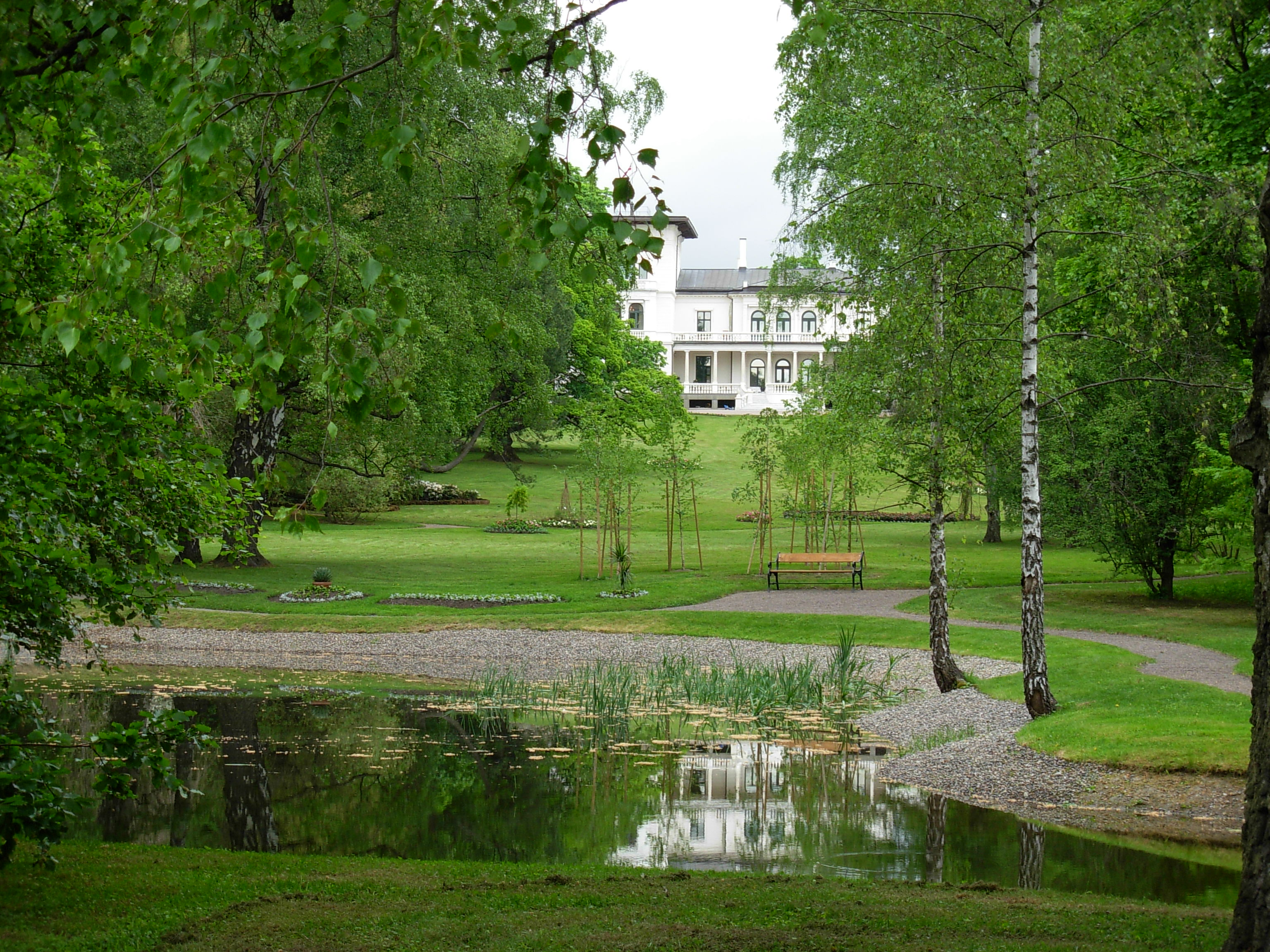
Søndre Skøyen at Skøyenparken

Nicolay August Andresen (2 August 1812 – 3 January 1894) was a Norwegian banker. He was born in Christiania (now Oslo, Norway), a son of Nicolai Andresen and Engel Johanne Christiane Reichborn. He was a brother of merchant and factory owner Johan Henrik Andresen, and of silver mines manager Carl Ferdinand Andresen.

He took over N. A. Andresen & Co, the banking part of his father's company and operated the bank with his brother Engelhart Andresen as partner. The bank developed to become among the largest banks in Christiania, and was later known as Andresens Bank.

He was married to Nielsine Augusta Butenschøn (1818-1842) with whom he had a son, Nils born in 1842. Andresen was the owner and developer of Skøyen Manor (Sondre Skoyen). This estate was located in the neighborhood of Skøyen and is today the site of Skøyenparken, a residential park dating to the 1860s. In 1893, their son Nils August Andresen Butenschøn, assumed his mother's surname, Butenschøn. He served as a chief executive of Andresens Bank and inherited Skøyen Manor.

His brother Johan Henrik is the grandfather of Johan H. Andresen, great-grandfather of Johan H. Andresen jr., and great-great grandfather of Katharina Andresen and Alexandra Andresen.
