= Ernst Torp =

Norwegian architect (1900–1988)

Ernst Torp (26 December 1900 – 11 January 1988) was a Norwegian architect.

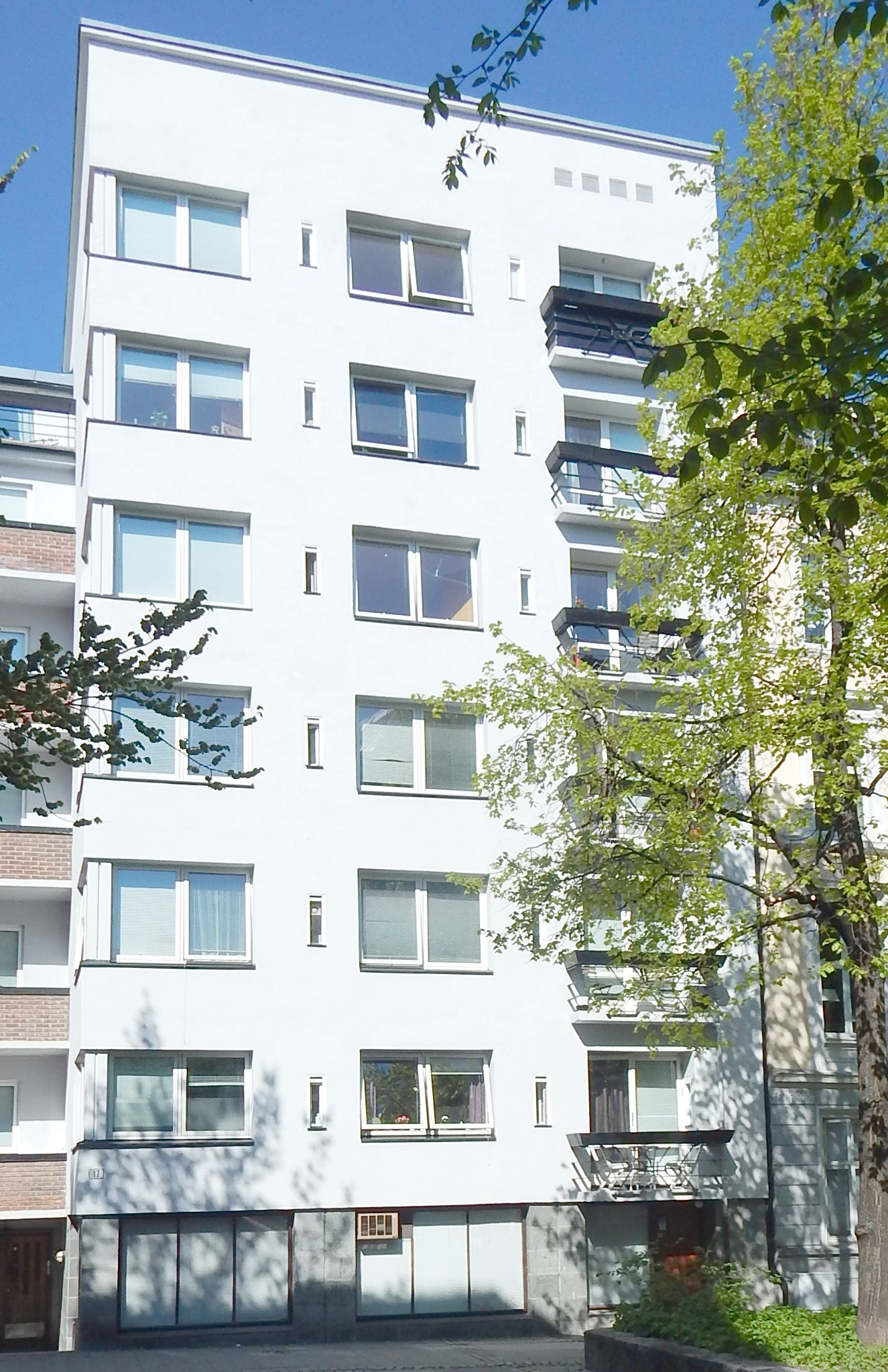
Hybelhus at Hegdehaugsveien 17 in Oslo

Torp was born in Kristiania (now Oslo), Norway. He was the son of Hjalmar Torp (1856-1922) and his wife Marie Fredrikke Severine Vaumund (1859-1946). He was a brother of architect Leif Torp, and father of architects Fredrik Torp and Niels A. Torp. Through his marriage with Nini Augusta Butenschøn he was a brother-in-law of banker Barthold A. Butenschøn and sculptor Ragnhild Butenschøn.

He attended Statens håndverks- og kunstindustriskole (now Oslo National Academy of the Arts) and Christiania tekniske skole (now Oslo University College). He graduated from the Arkitektutdannelse Kunsta (now Royal Danish Academy of Fine Arts) in Copenhagen during 1923. He conducted study trips in the Netherlands, France and Italy during 1923 and to France and Italy in 1925.

From 1926, Torp was employed by the City of Oslo. Along with his brother Leif, Torp ran the architect firm Torp & Torp from 1930 to 1974. The firm principally designed high quality public and commercial buildings. These included Torstedhjørnet at Stortingsgata 30, Dronningens gate 10 and 11 and Hieronymus Heyerdahls gate 1, all in Oslo. In 1976, the firm was awarded the Sundts premie for the design of the offices of Fellesbanken at Karl Johans gate 27 in Oslo.

== Selected works ==
- Stortingsgata 30 - 1928-30
- Drammensveien 50, 50c and 52c - 1932
- Hieronymus Heyerdahls gate 1 - 1936-38
- Hoffsveien 30 - 1948-53
- Eiksveien 7 - 1954
- Oscars gate 90 - 1953
- Marcus Thranes gate 2 - 1960-62
- Trondheimsveien 389–391 - 1961
- Dronning Mauds gate 10- 11 - 1965
- Karl Johans gate 27 - 1975

== Gallery ==
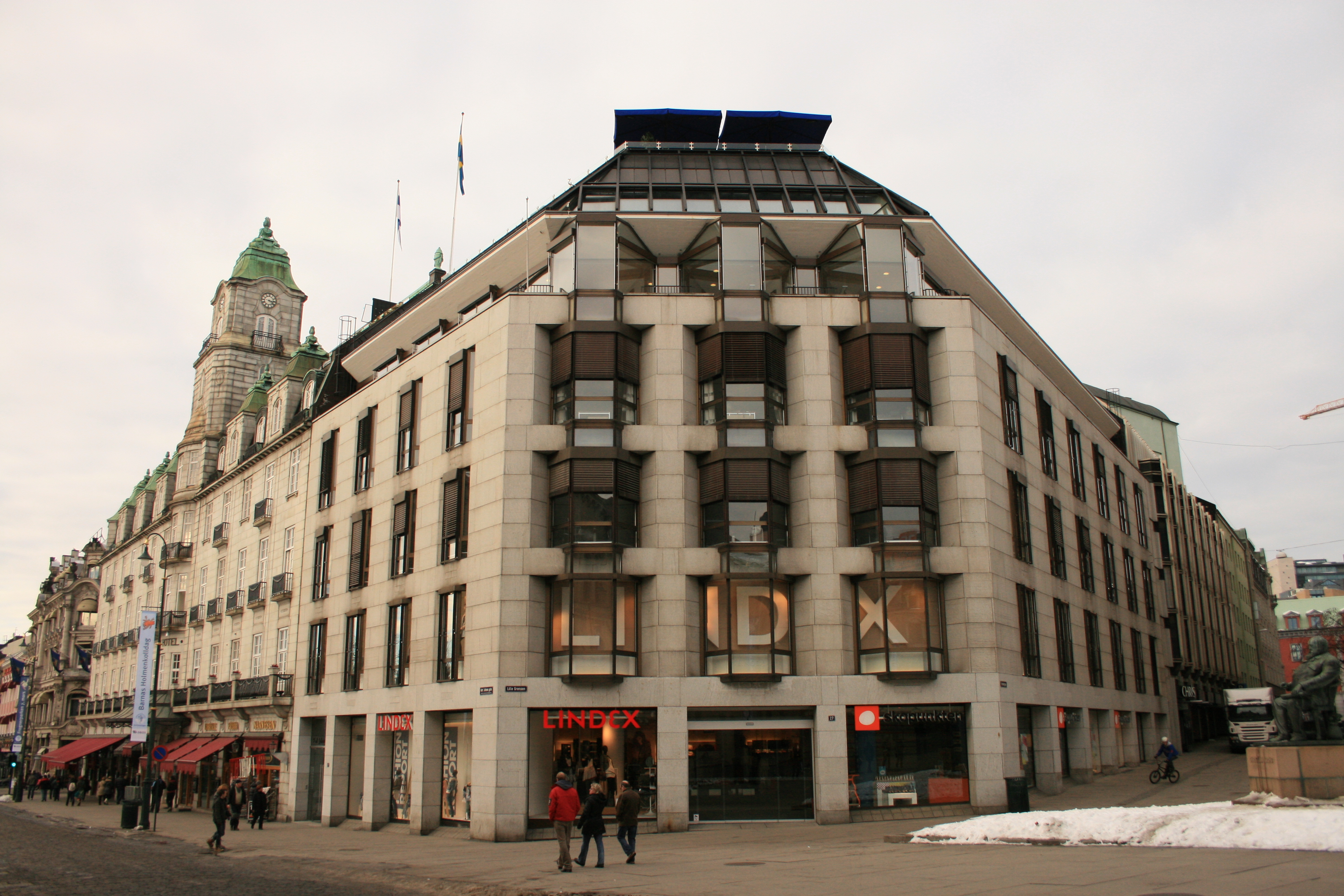
Karl Johans gate 27

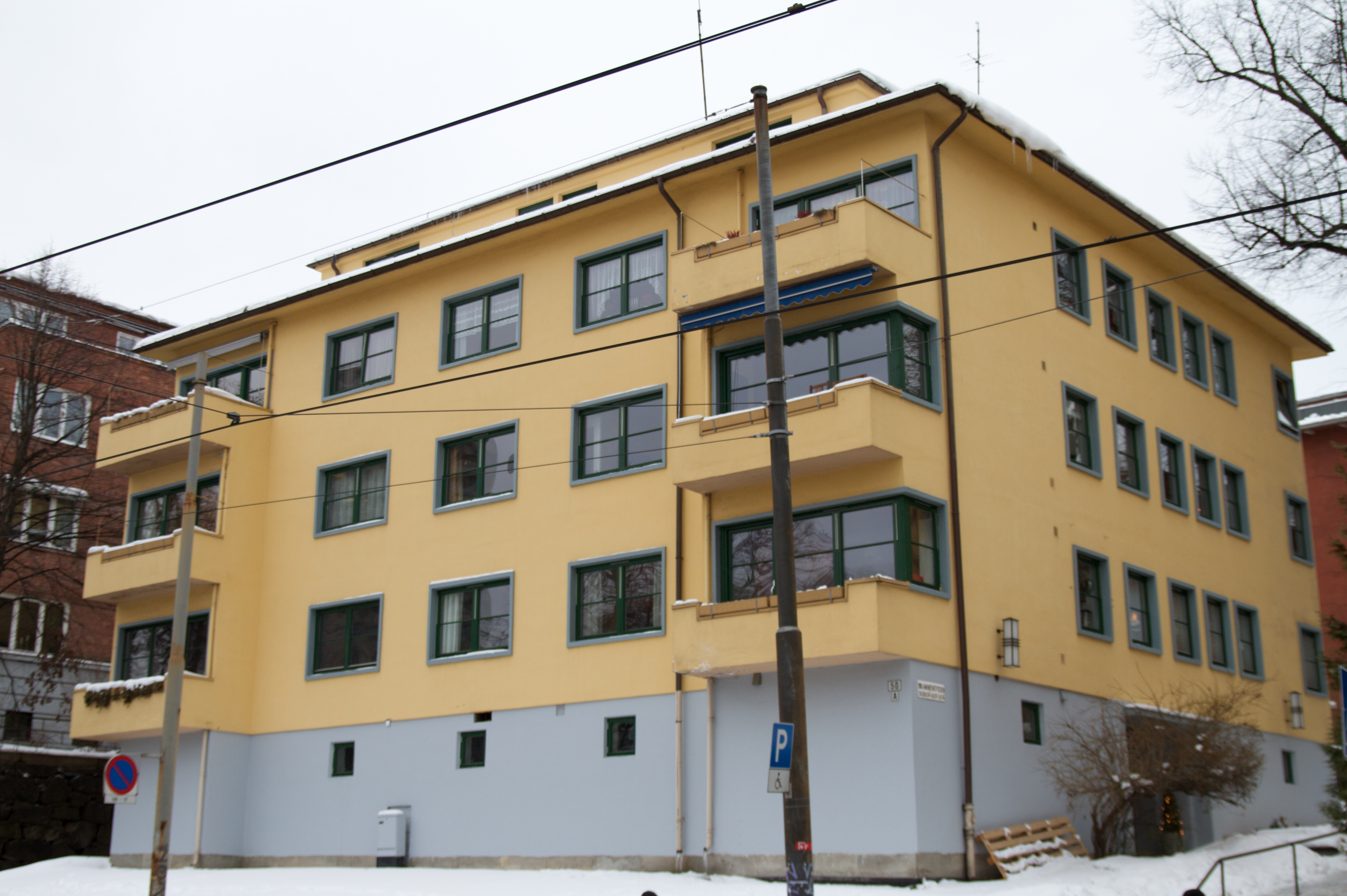
Drammensveien 50 A

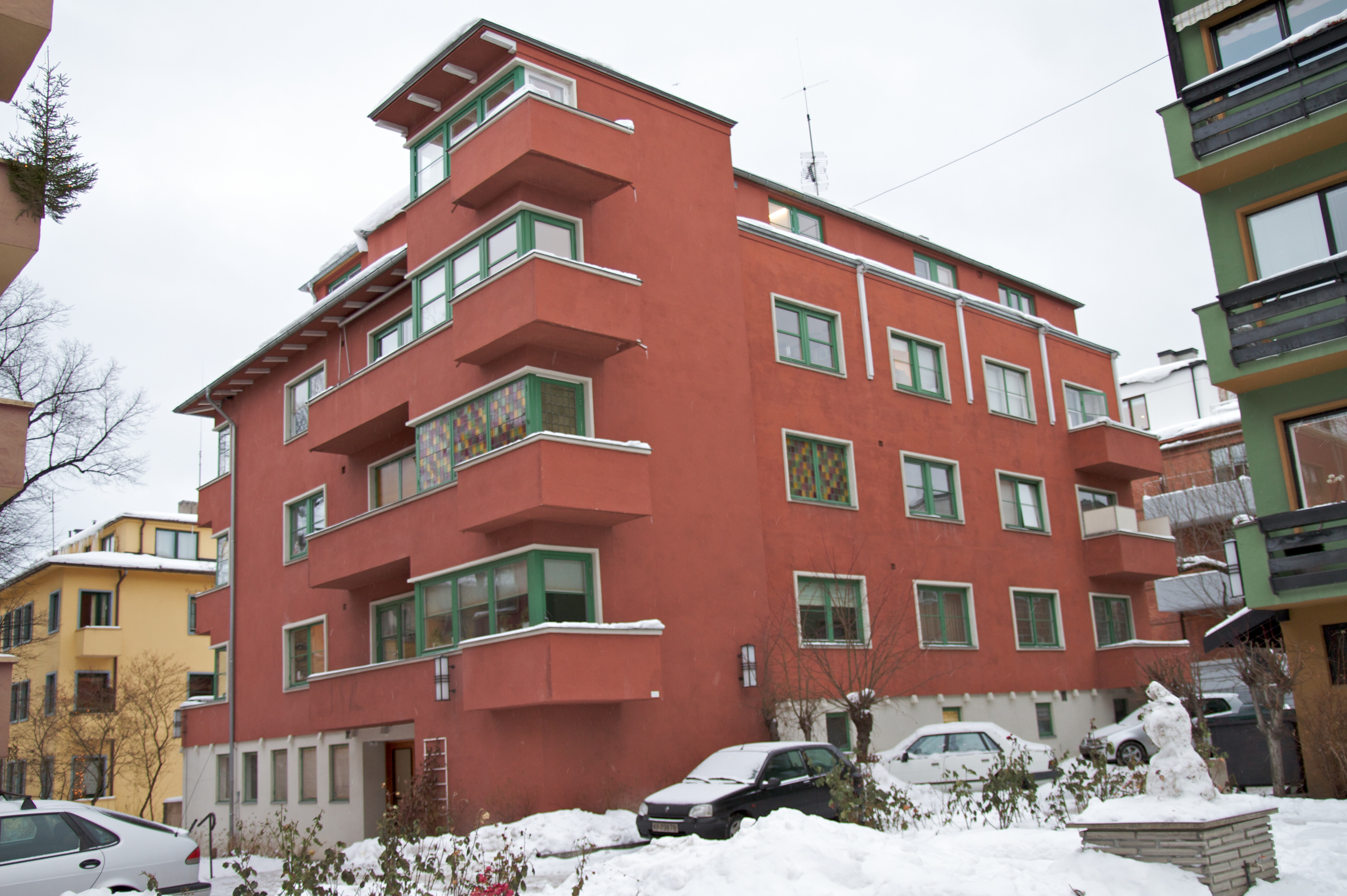
Drammensveien 50B

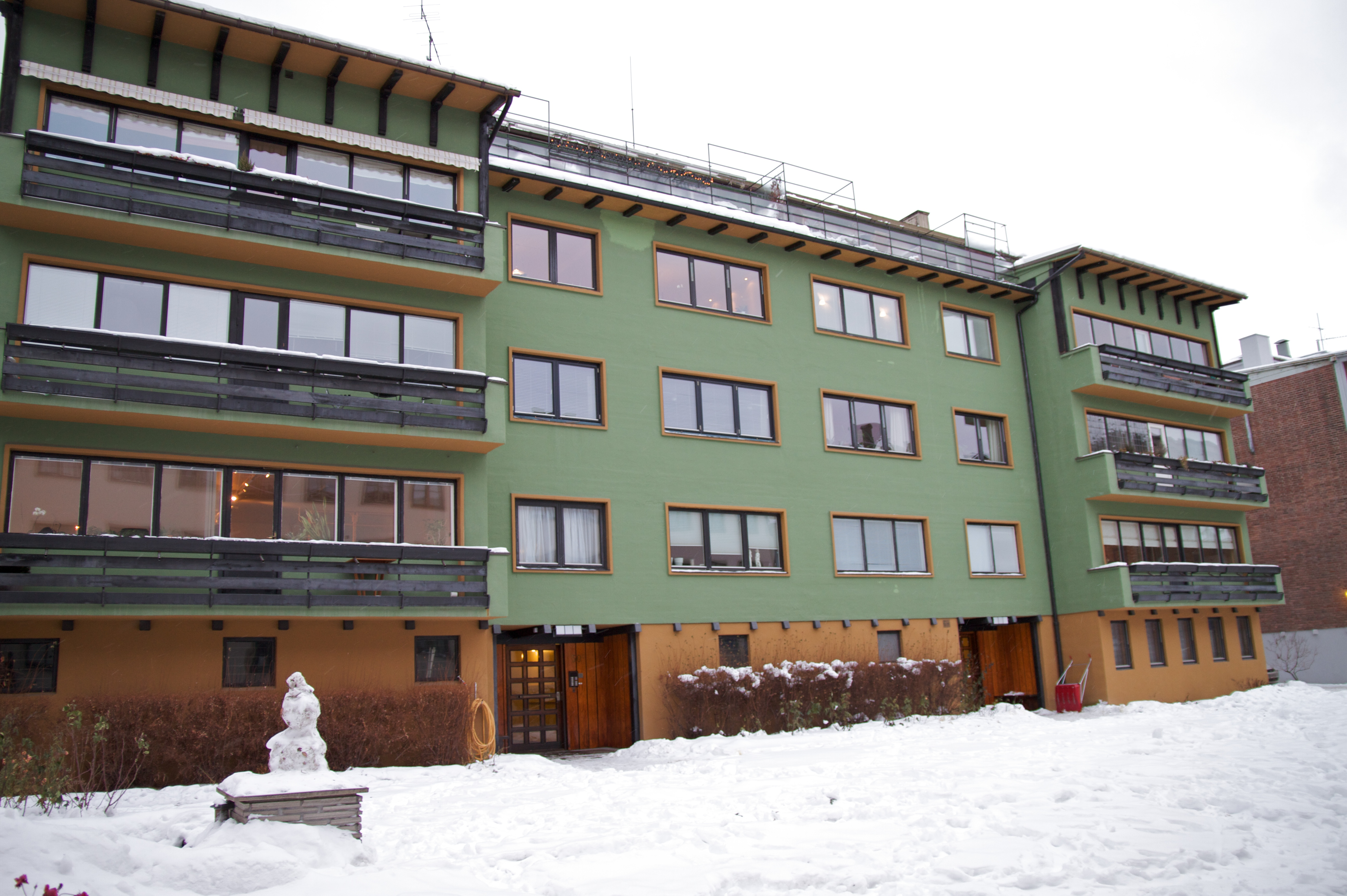
Drammensveien 50C-D

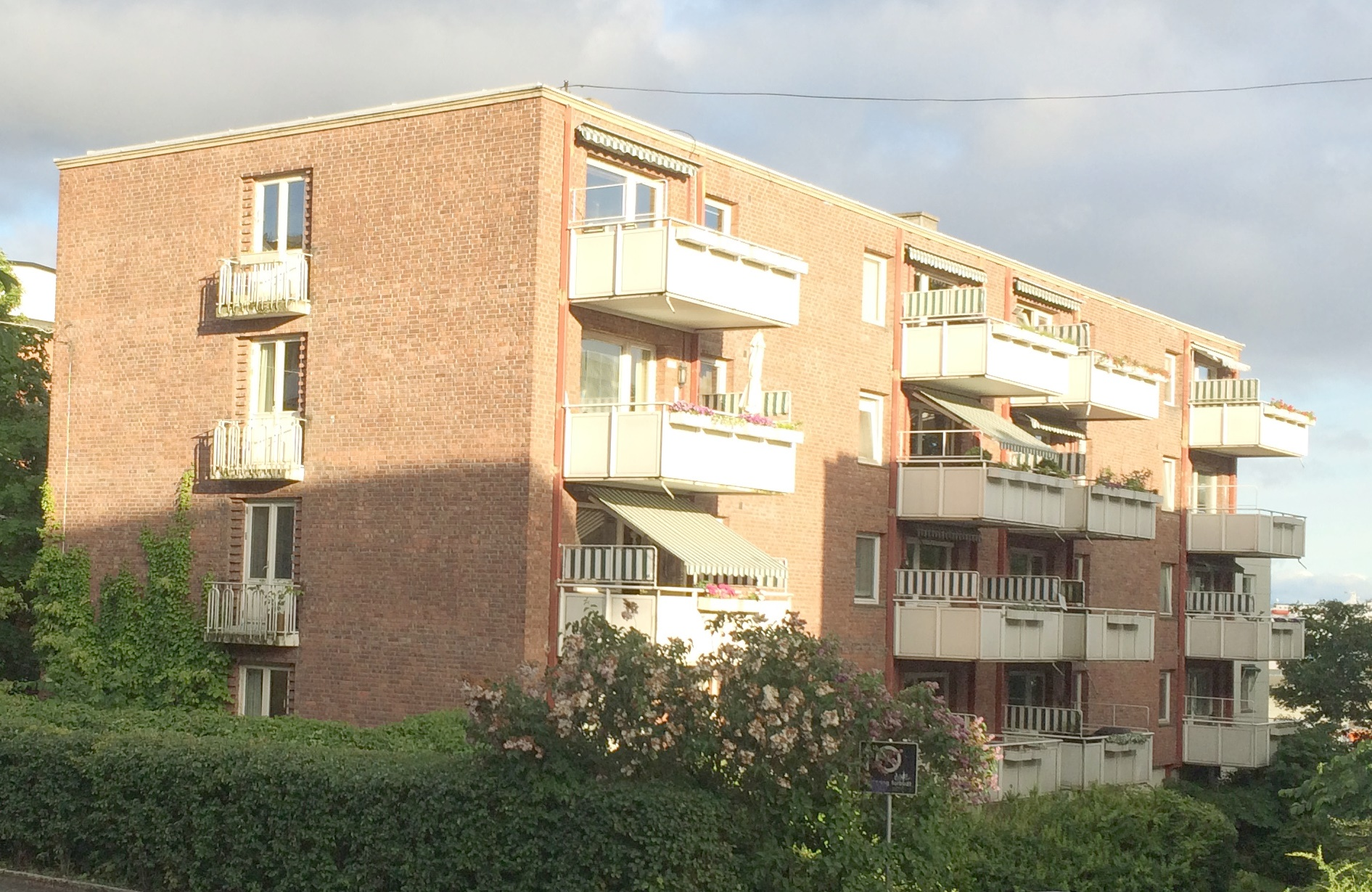
Munkedamsveien 78

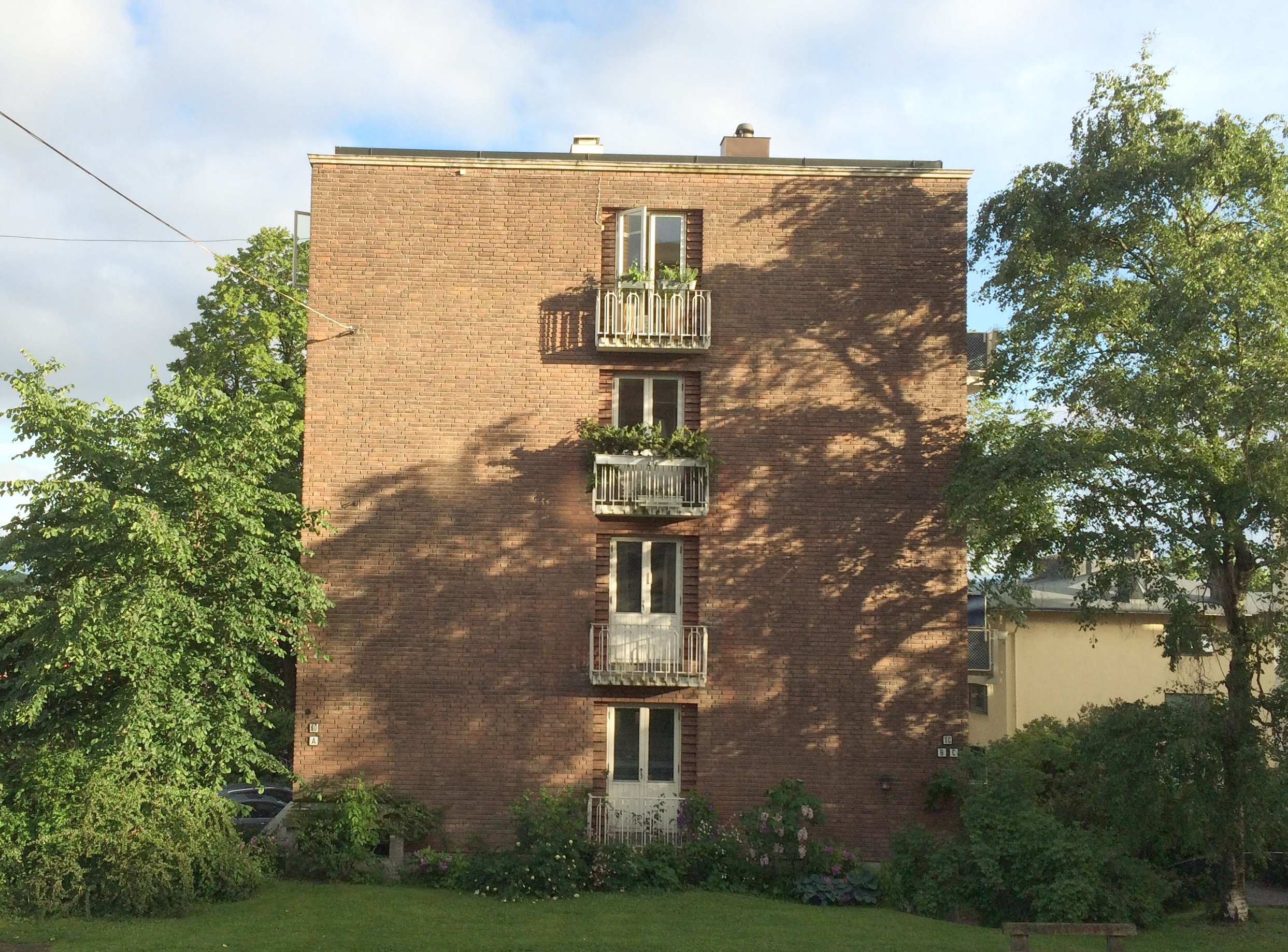
Munkedamsveien 80
