= Ragnhild Butenschøn =

Norwegian sculptor (1912–1992)

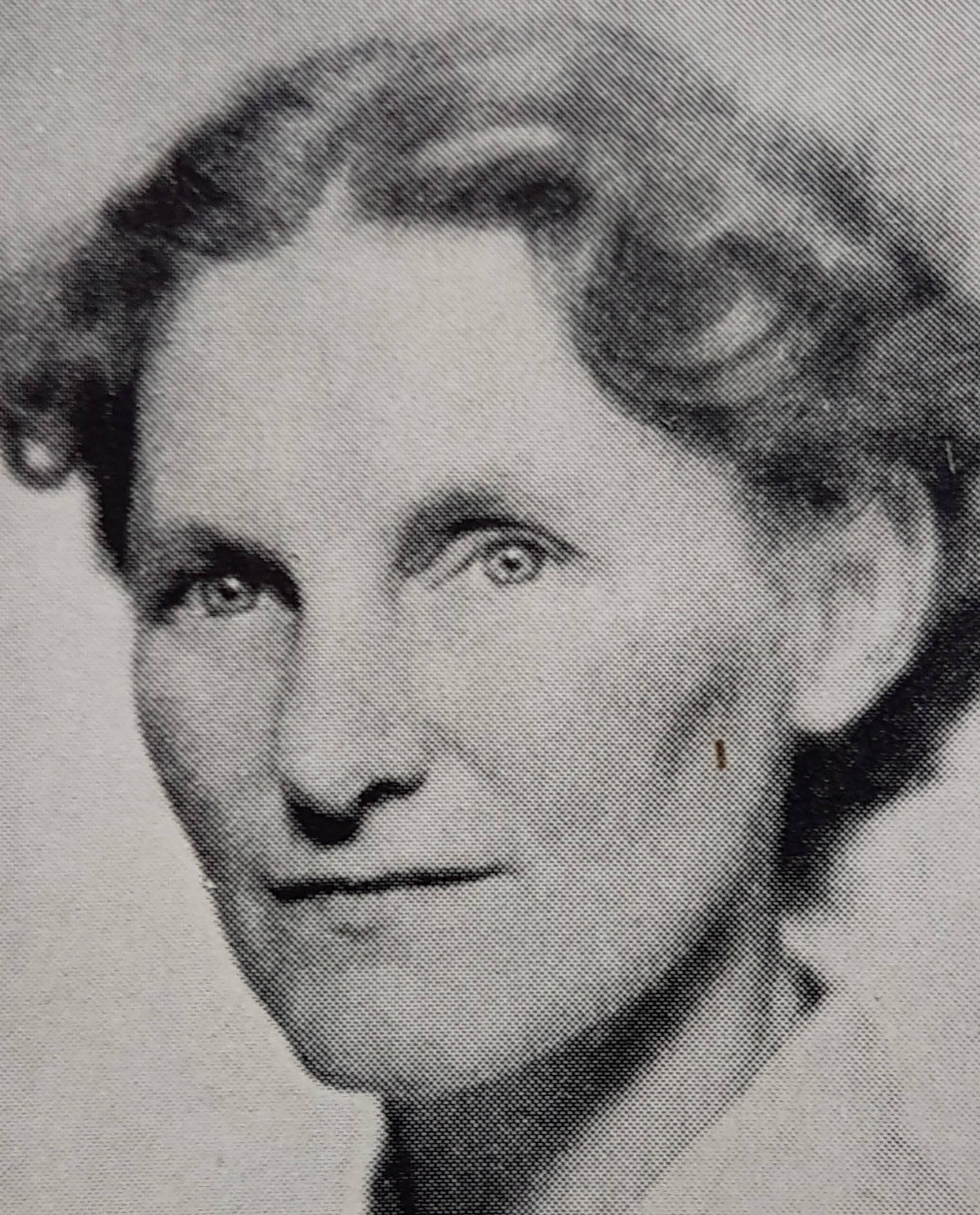
- Born: 21 September 1912; Kristiania, Norway
- Died: 3 September 1992 (aged 79); Akershus, Norway
- Education: Norwegian National Academy of Craft and Art Industry
- Occupation: sculptor
- Spouse: Barthold A. Butenschøn

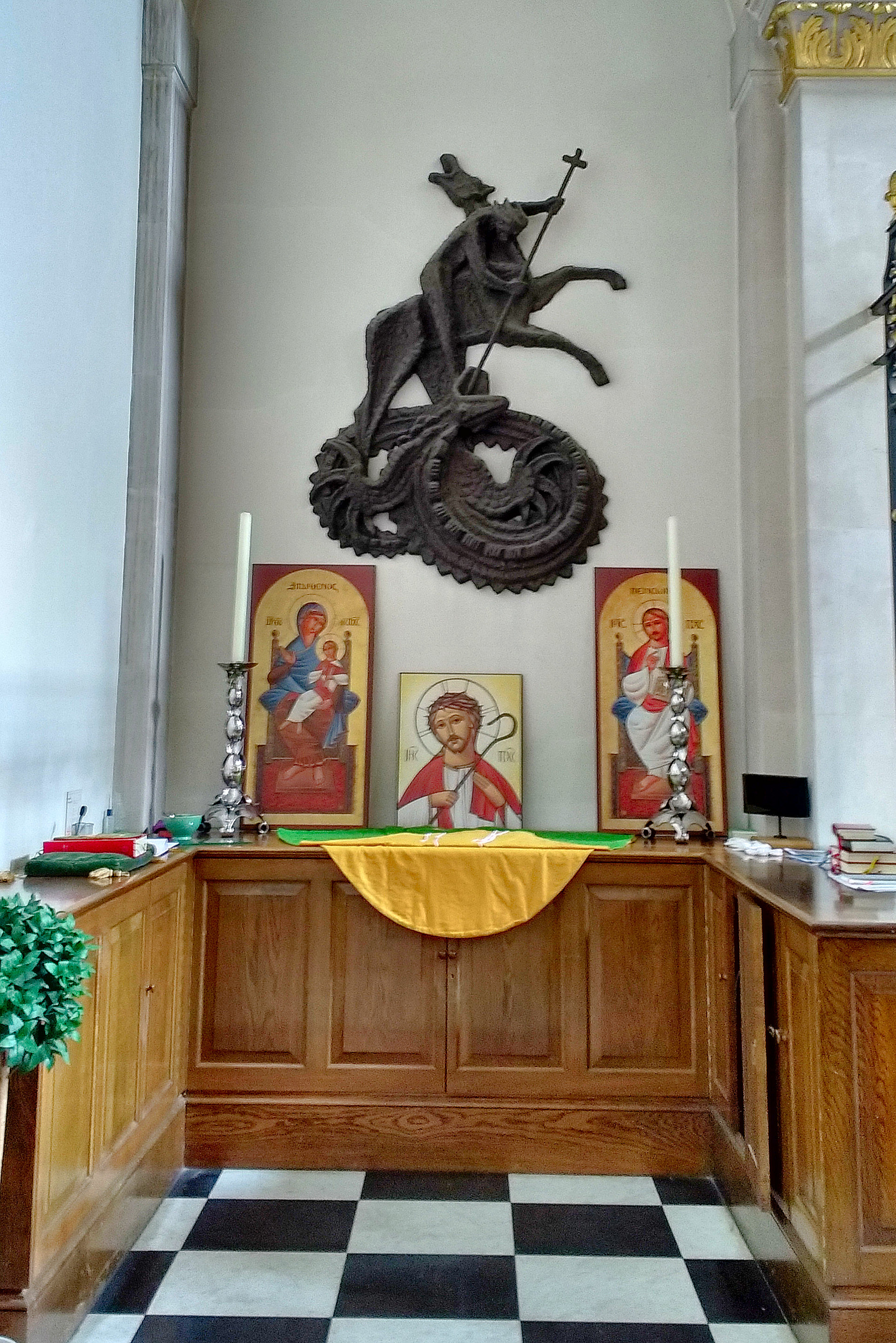
Bronze relief in the North Chapel at St Mary-le-Bow in London

Ragnhild Butenschøn, née Jakhelln (21 September 1912 – 3 September 1992) was a Norwegian sculptor. She was especially known for her church art.

== Personal life ==
She was born in Kristiania (now Oslo), Norway, She was a daughter of major Alf Jakhelln (1883–1947) and Agnes Prebensen (1884–1923). After he mother's death when she was eleven, she was raised by an uncle and aunt in Østerdalen. She was trained in Budapest by Vilmos Aba-Novák in 1934 and at the Norwegian National Academy of Craft and Art Industry (Statens håndverks- og kunstindustriskole) by Wilhelm Rasmussen. She also took a summer course with Per Palle Storm.

In 1936 she married publisher Barthold A. Butenschøn with whom she had five children. She was a daughter-in-law of Barthold A. Butenschøn, Sr., and the mother of Hans Barthold Butenschøn, Peter Butenschøn and Nils Butenschøn.

== Career ==
Her sculptures include the bronze fountain Dansende jenter at Slemmestad from 1958, the bronze sculpture Rosepiken in Molde from 1971, and the steel sculpture Flyktningemor at Riksgalleriet from 1971. Her bronze in St. Mary-le-Bow Church in London is a memorial to the fallen in the Norwegian resistance movement during World War II. The artwork featuring Saint George and the Dragon was unveiled by King Olav V of Norway in 1966. She also delivered decorations to several Norwegian churches, including Hamar Cathedral and Fredrikstad Cathedral as well as at the National Gallery in Oslo. She was awarded the King's Medal of Merit in 1985. She died during 1992 at Ytre Enebakk in Akershus, Norway.

== Selected works ==
- Altertavle (1953) Helgøya kapell, Ringsaker
- Frans av Assisi preker for fuglene (1955) St. Hallvard's Church and Monastery, Oslo
- Dansende jenter (1958) Slemmestad
- St. Olav til hest (1964) Olav Chapel, Sandefjord
- Monument over Henrik Sørensen (1968) Lillestrøm
- Maria bebudelse (1975) Torshov Church, Oslo
- Livets tr (1979) Asker Church in Akershus
- Hellig Olav (1984) St. Olav's Cathedral, Oslo
- St. Dominikus (1988) Lunden kloster, Oslo
