= Johan H. Andresen =

Norwegian industrialist and politician

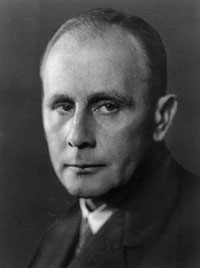
Johan H. Andresen.

Johan H. Andresen (29 November 1888 – 21 October 1953) was a Norwegian industrialist and politician for the Conservative Party.

== Personal life ==
He was born in Kristiania as a son of factory owner Nicolai Andresen (1853–1923) (1853–1923) and Johanne Marie Heyerdahl (1855–1928). He was a grandson of Johan Henrik Andresen and great-grandson of Nicolai Andresen.

In 1929 he married Eva Klaveness (1900–1965), a daughter of ship-owner Anton Frederik Klaveness. Their son Johan Henrik Andresen (1930–2011), and grandson Johan Henrik Andresen carried on the business legacy.

== Career ==
He was the owner of the tobacco factory J. L. Tiedemanns Tobaksfabrik, and among the richest persons in Norway. He was a member of the Parliament of Norway from 1928 to 1933. During the occupation of Norway by Nazi Germany he was incarcerated at the Grini concentration camp for a period of four months in 1942.

He was decorated Commander of the Danish Order of the Dannebrog, and Knight of the Swedish Order of Vasa. He died in Sweden in 1953.
