= Niels Torp AS =

Norwegian architectural firm

Niels Torp AS is an architectural firm based in Oslo, Norway. The company is named after its current owner Niels A. Torp (born 1940), and was founded by his father and uncle as Torp & Torp.

== Works ==
- Scandinavian Airlines Head Office (Solna Municipality, Sweden)
- Waterside (Harmondsworth, London Borough of Hillingdon)
- Royal Jordanian Airlines head office (Amman, Jordan)
- Gardermoen Airport, Oslo, Norway
