= Hanna Butenschøn =

Norwegian author(1851–1928)

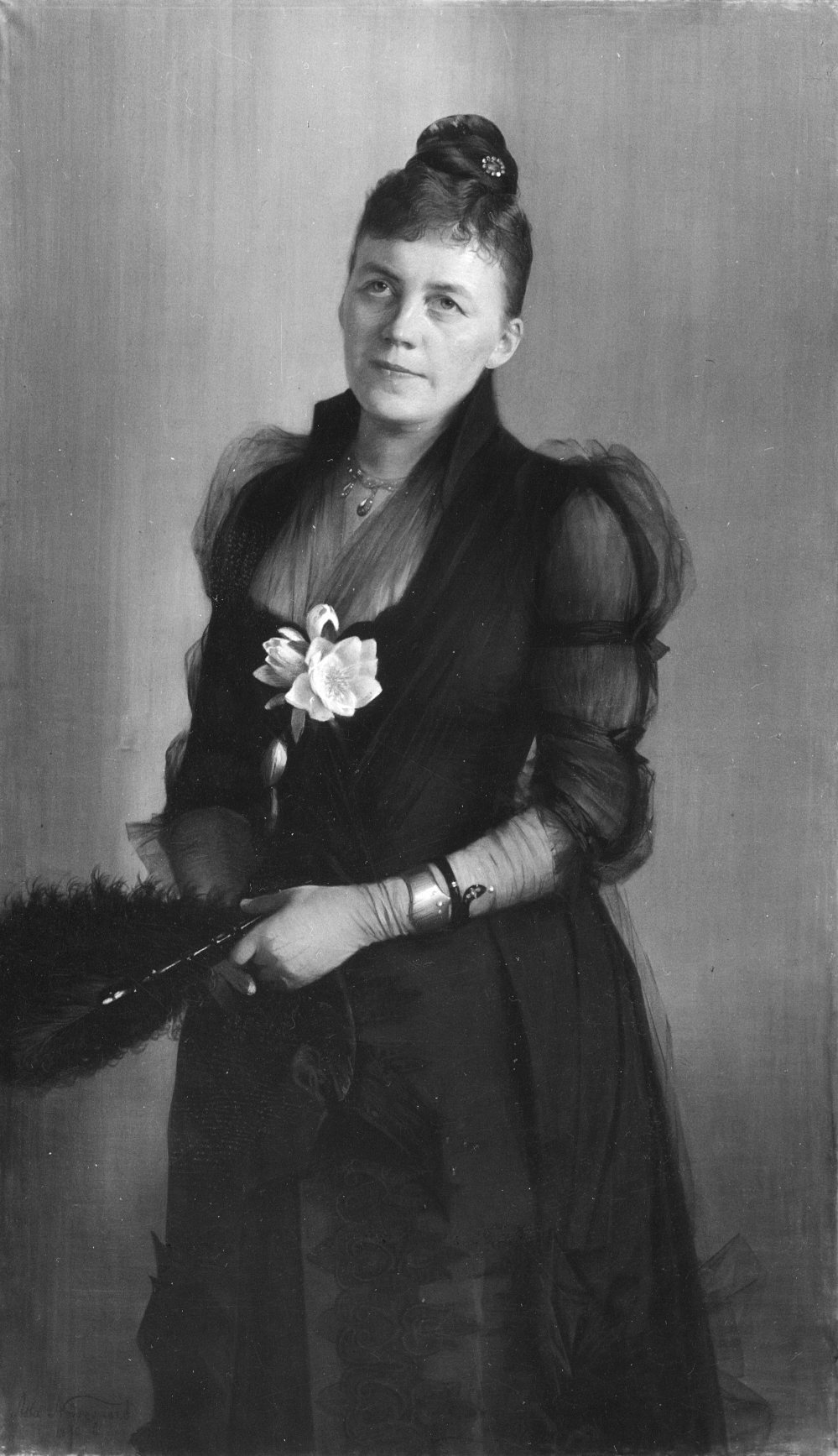
- Portrait of Butenschøn (1890).
- Born: July 12, 1851; Holt, Norway
- Died: June 7, 1928 (aged 76); Oslo, Norway
- Occupation: Author
- Spouse: Nils August Andresen Butenschøn
- Children: Barthold A. Butenschøn Sr.
- Relatives: Barthold A. Butenschøn

Hanna Andresen Butenschøn (née Døderlein, pen name Helene Dickmar; July 12, 1851 – June 7, 1928) was a Norwegian author.

== Family ==
Butenschøn was born in Holt Municipality, Norway, to the dean Christian Grønbech Døderlein (1816–1898) and Malvina Petersen (1820–1909). She married the businessman Nils August Andresen Butenschøn (1842–1935) in 1871. She was the mother of the businessman Barthold A. Butenschøn Sr. (1877–1971) and the grandmother of the banker and publisher Barthold A. Butenschøn (1904–2001).

== Career ==
Butenschøn published some critical-polemical pamphlets and then, under the pen name Helene Dickmar, the novel Ud i Livet (1890). This was followed by Ellen (1893), Psyche. En Kvindes Kjærligheds Historie (1906), Det gylne Bæger (1910), and Danserinden: af Dr. Gerhard B.s efterladte optegnelser (1918), as well as the plays Korsvei (1901), September (1903), and Som vi nu engang er – (1915).

== Bibliography ==
- En Qvinderøst i "Handskespørgsmaalet": aabent Brev til hr. Professor Monrad (1886)
- Om ægteskabsidéen i Fruen fra havet (1889)
- Ud i livet (1890)
- Har Henrik Ibsen i Hedda Gabler skildret virkelige kvinder? (1891)
- Ellen (1893)
- To Literære studier. I Den moderne literatur. II Henrik Ibsen: Bygmester Solness (1894)
- Fra Kogebogen (1895)
- Korsvei (1901)
- September (1903)
- Lidt om "Kjærlighed" og Gunnar Heibergs "Kjærlighedens Tragedie" (1905)
- Psyche. En Kvindes Kjærligheds Historie (1906)
- Det gyldne bæger (1910)
- Som vi nu engang er – (1915)
- Danserinden: af Dr. Gerhard B.s efterladte optegnelser (1918)
