= Peter Butenschøn =

Norwegian architect (born 1944)

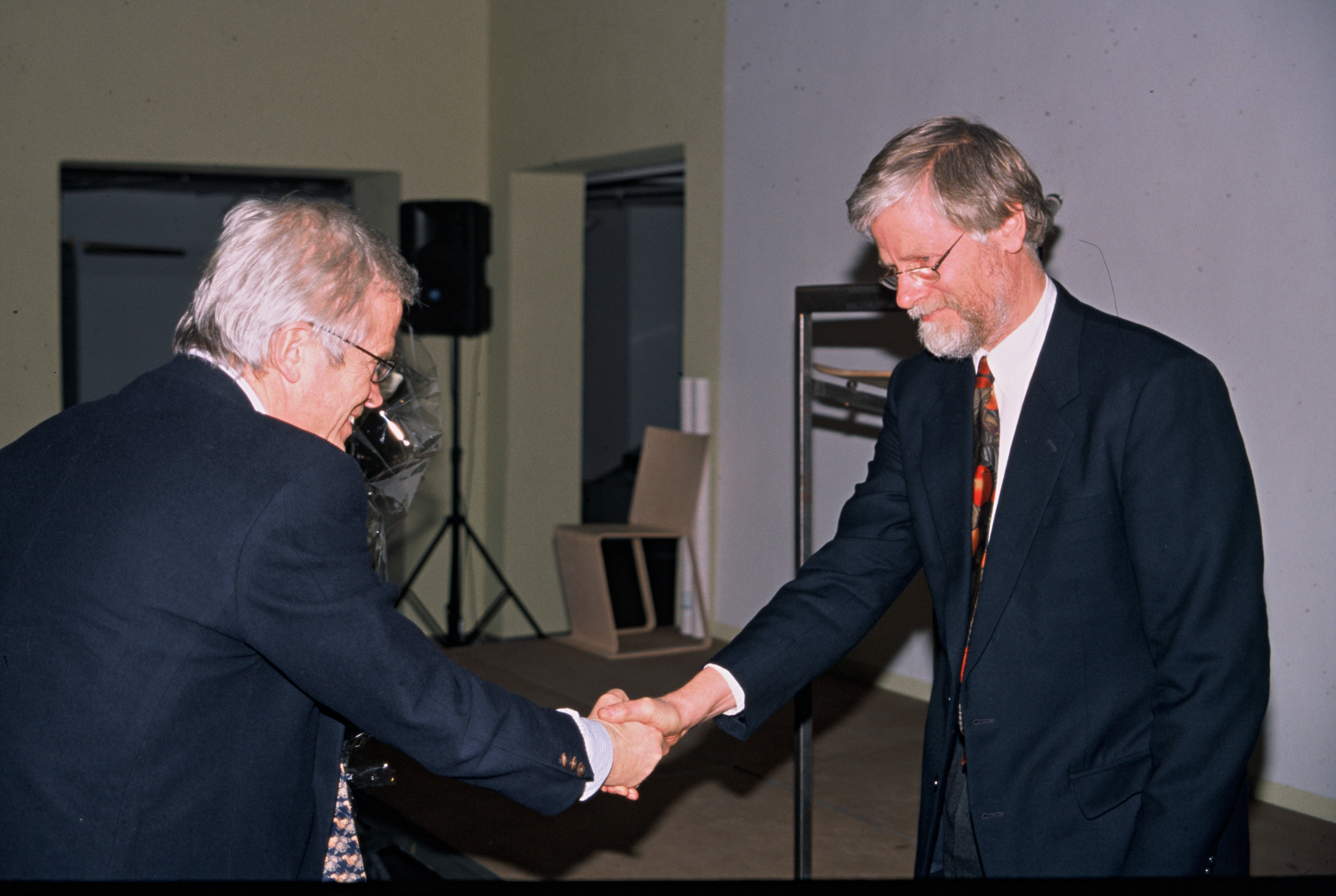
- Peter Butenschøn (right)
- Born: 20 April 1944 (age 80); Oslo, Norway
- Occupation: Architect
- Parent(s): Barthold A. Butenschøn and Ragnhild Butenschøn

Peter Butenschøn (born 20 April 1944) is a Norwegian architect and publicist. He was born in Oslo, the son of Barthold A. Butenschøn and Ragnhild Butenschøn. From 1973 to 1980 he lectured in city planning at the Oslo School of Architecture and Design. He was co-editor of the Norwegian journal Byggekunst and has been an architecture critic for the newspaper Dagbladet. He worked for the Ministry of Culture and contributed to the Report to Parliament titled Kultur i tiden. He was the first leader of the foundation Norsk Form, and chaired the board of the Norwegian Museum of Cultural History from 1989 to 1997.
