= Johan Henrik Andresen (1815–1874) =

Norwegian politician

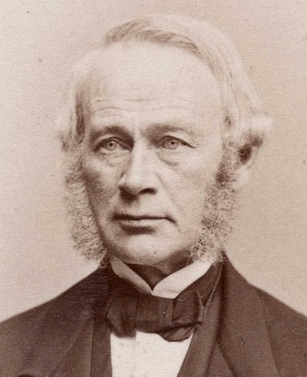
- Andresen in 1870. Photo by Frederik Klem.
- Born: 25 March 1815; Christiania, Norway
- Died: 5 June 1874 (aged 59)
- Occupations: Merchant, factory owner
- Parent: Nicolai Andresen
- Relatives: Nicolay August Andresen (brother); Johan H. Andresen (grandson)

Johan Henrik Andresen (25 March 1815 – 5 June 1874) was a Norwegian merchant, factory owner and politician.

== Biography ==
Andresen was born in Christiania (now Oslo), Norway. He was a son of Nicolai Andresen and Engel Johanne Christiane Reichborn. He was a brother of banker Nicolay August Andresen and silver mines manager Carl Ferdinand Andresen (1824–1890). He attended the Møller Institute (Møllers Institut) in Christiania.

He bought the tobacco factory J. L. Tiedemanns Tobaksfabrik from Johann Ludwig Tiedemann in 1849. He subsequently developed both the factory and his merchandise to significant sizes. He was a member of the city council of Christiania from 1856 to 1863. Andresen was selected as an alternate to the Norwegian Parliament from the cities of Christiania, Hønefoss and Kongsvinger from 1868 to 1869 and from 1871 to 1873.

He wrote the book Om Myntforandringen, published in 1873.

== Personal life ==
He was married to Petra Juell (1829-1917). He was the father of factory owner Nicolai Andresen (1853–1923), grandfather of factory owner Johan H. Andresen and great-grandfather of Johan H. Andresen jr.
