= Nicolai Andresen =

Norwegian politician (1781–1861)

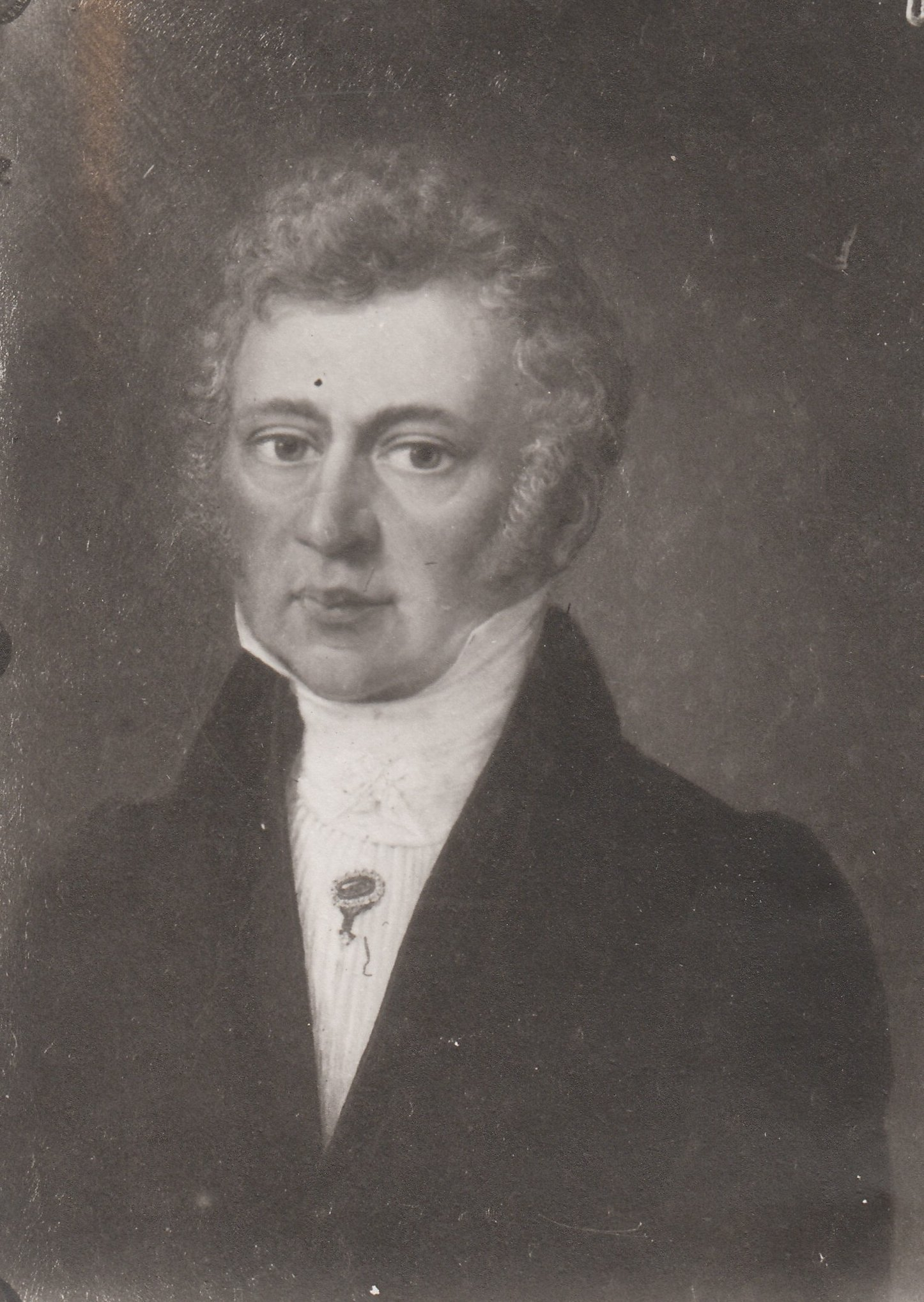
Nicolai Andresen

Nicolai Andresen (24 September 1781 – 18 November 1861) was a Norwegian merchant, banker and member of Stortinget. He laid the foundation for Andresens Bank A/S, which after several mergers became Nordea Bank Norge.

Andresen was born at Tønder in southern Jutland, Denmark. He was the son of Christian Andresen and Cecilie Cathrine Asmussen. Andresen had studied under a merchant in Flensburg, before immigrated to Christiania (now Oslo) in 1801. He first entered as a partner with merchant G. F. Hagemann until 1809, when he established his own trading and shipping business. Subsequently, Andresen also operated a factory which manufactured glazed tiles and cornice stones of baked clay. His interest in banking grew out of his trading company.

Andresen also actively participated in the public life. In 1818, he met in the Norwegian Parliament as an alternate. In 1821, he was selected as an alternate and in 1824 he met as permanent representative of Christiania. He was again an alternate to Parliament in 1833, 1836 and 1839. He was a member of the city council in Christiania 1837–43. For its public efforts he was named Knight of the Swedish Order of Vasa.

Andresen and his wife Engel Johanne Christiane Reichborn (1790-1826) had eleven children. They were the parents of Nicolay August Andresen (1812–1894) who took over Andresens Bank and Johan Henrik Andresen (1815–1874) who took over the mercantile business.
