= Fredrik Torp =

Norwegian architect (1937–2023)

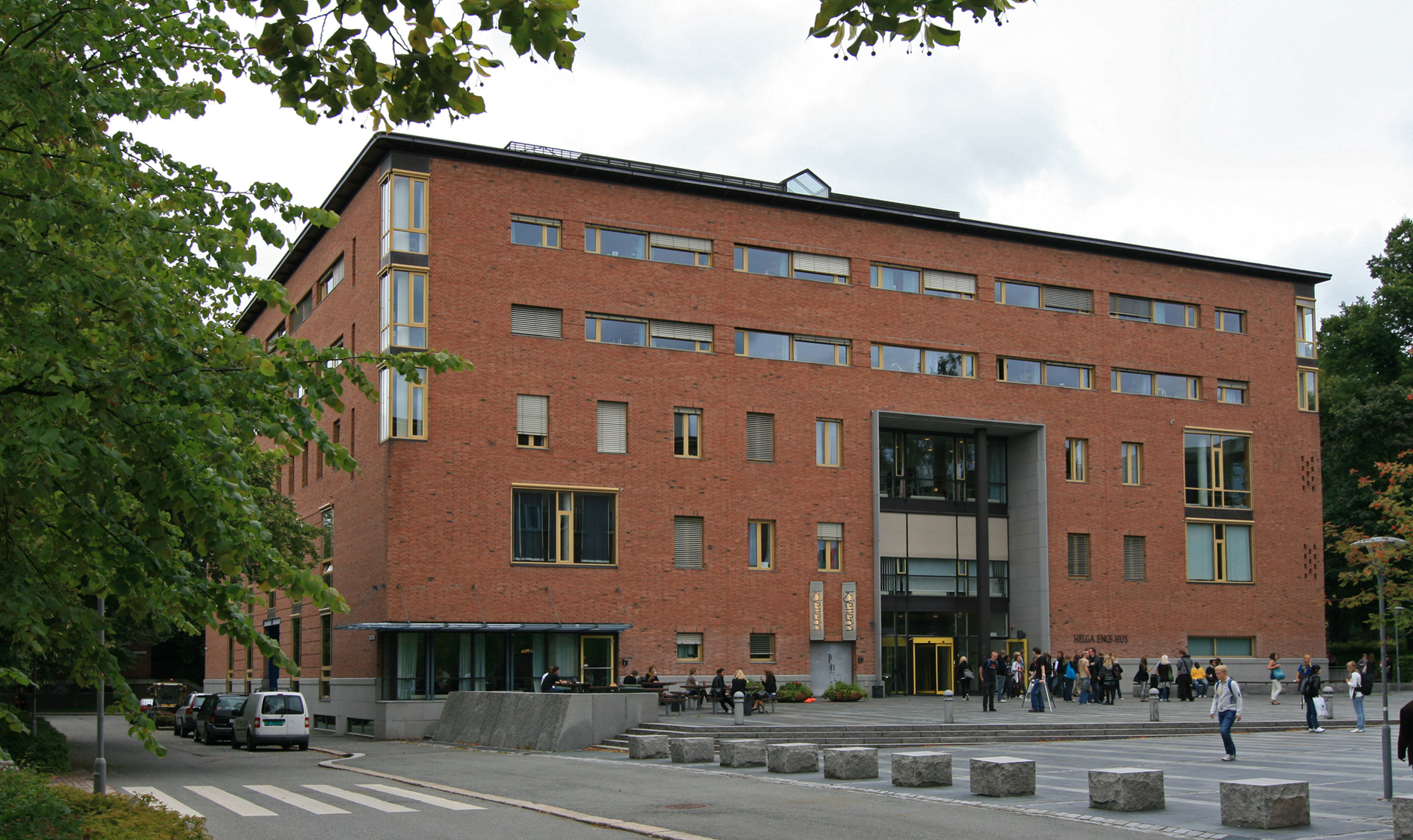
Helga Eng's house, University of Oslo

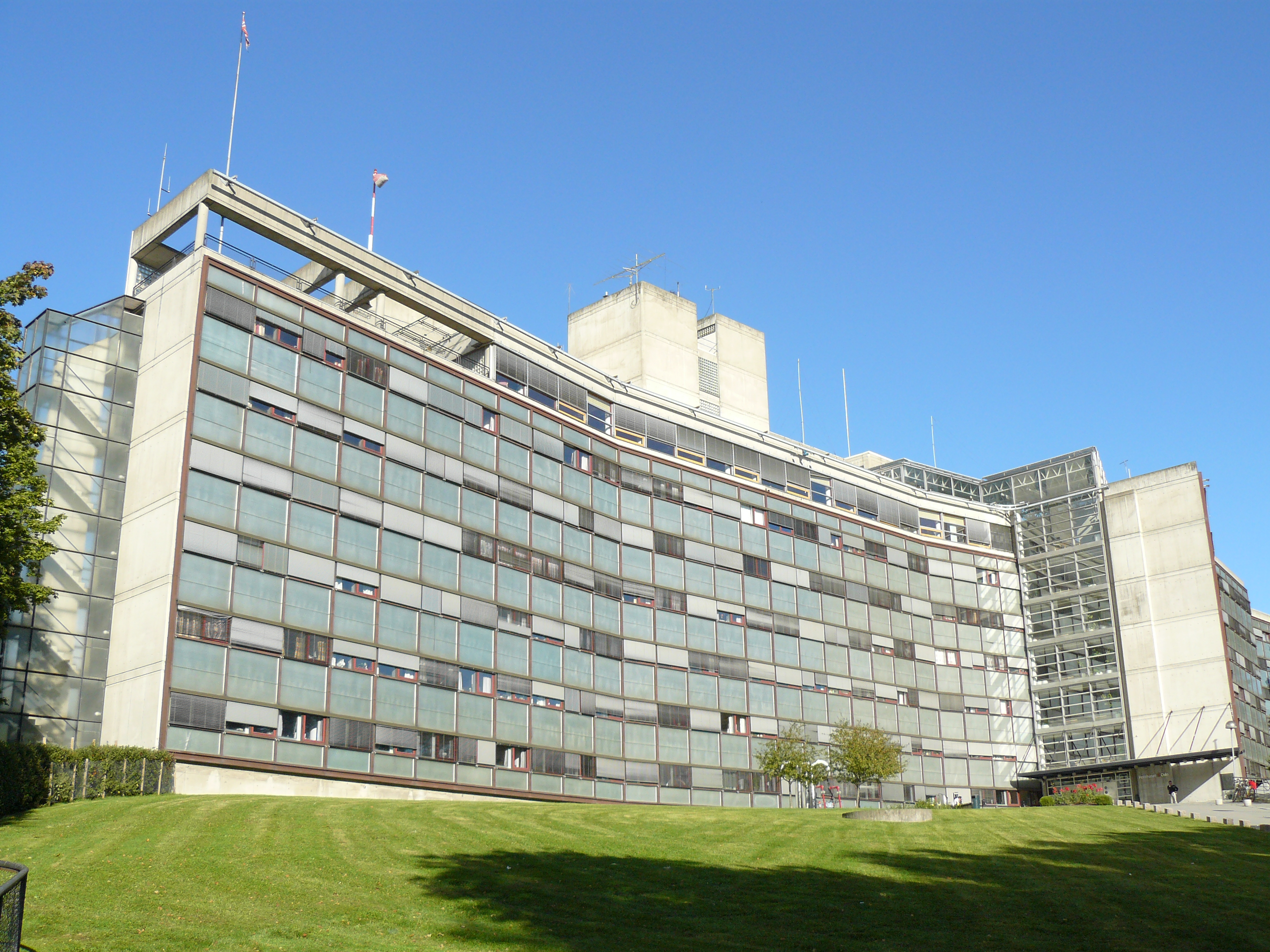
Oslo police headquarters

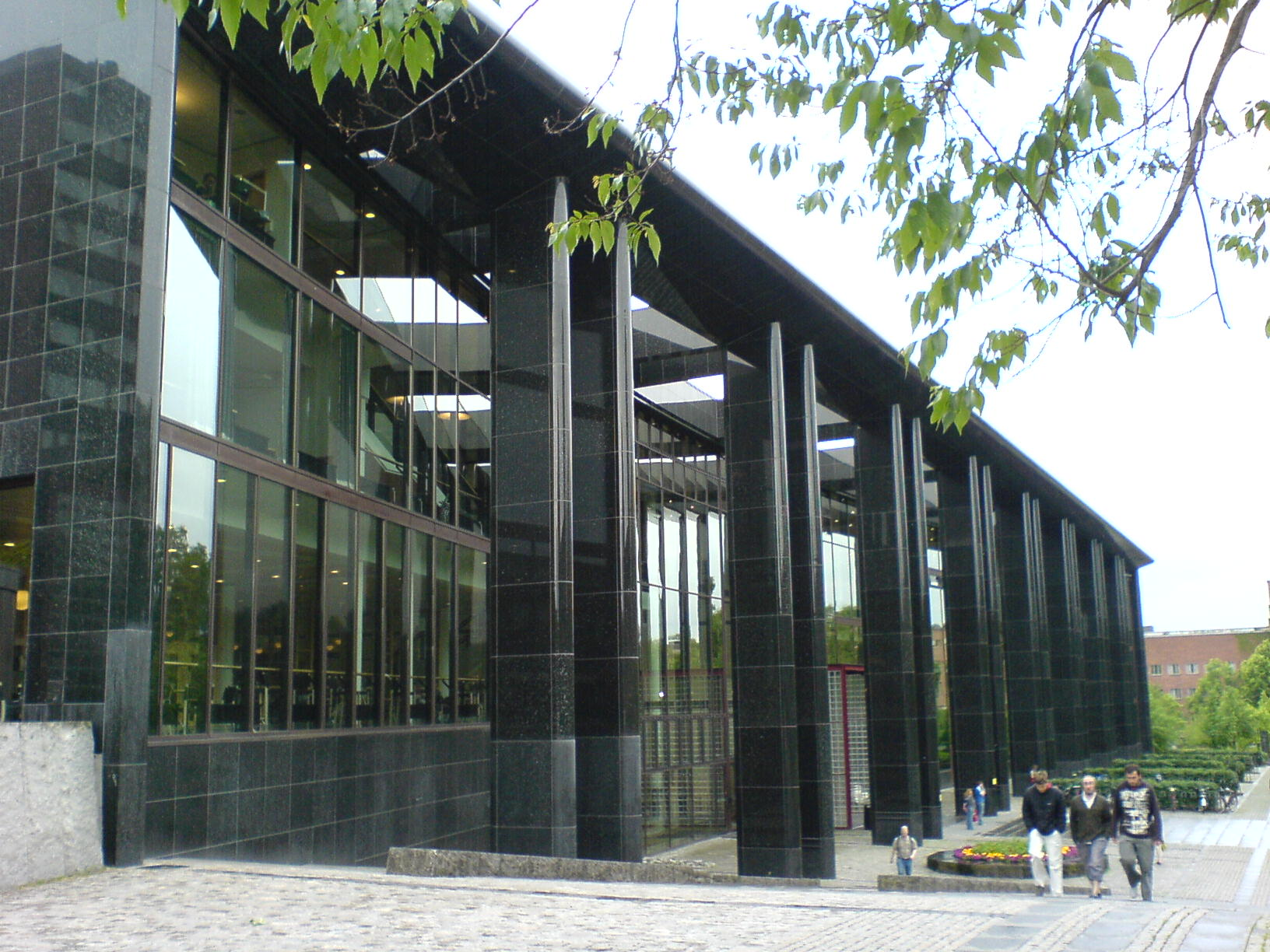
University Library of Oslo

Fredrik Adrian Svenning Torp (24 May 1937 – 26 July 2023) was a Norwegian architect.

Torp took his degree at the Norwegian Institute of Technology in 1961, and in 1965 he established the company Telje-Torp-Aasen Arkitektkontor together with Are Telje and Knut Aasen. Among their works are the new University Library of Oslo (1999) and the Oslo police headquarters (1978).

Torp died on 26 July 2023, at the age of 86.
