= Skøyen =

Neighborhood in Oslo, Norway

Coordinates: 59°55′19.513″N 10°41′1.8996″E

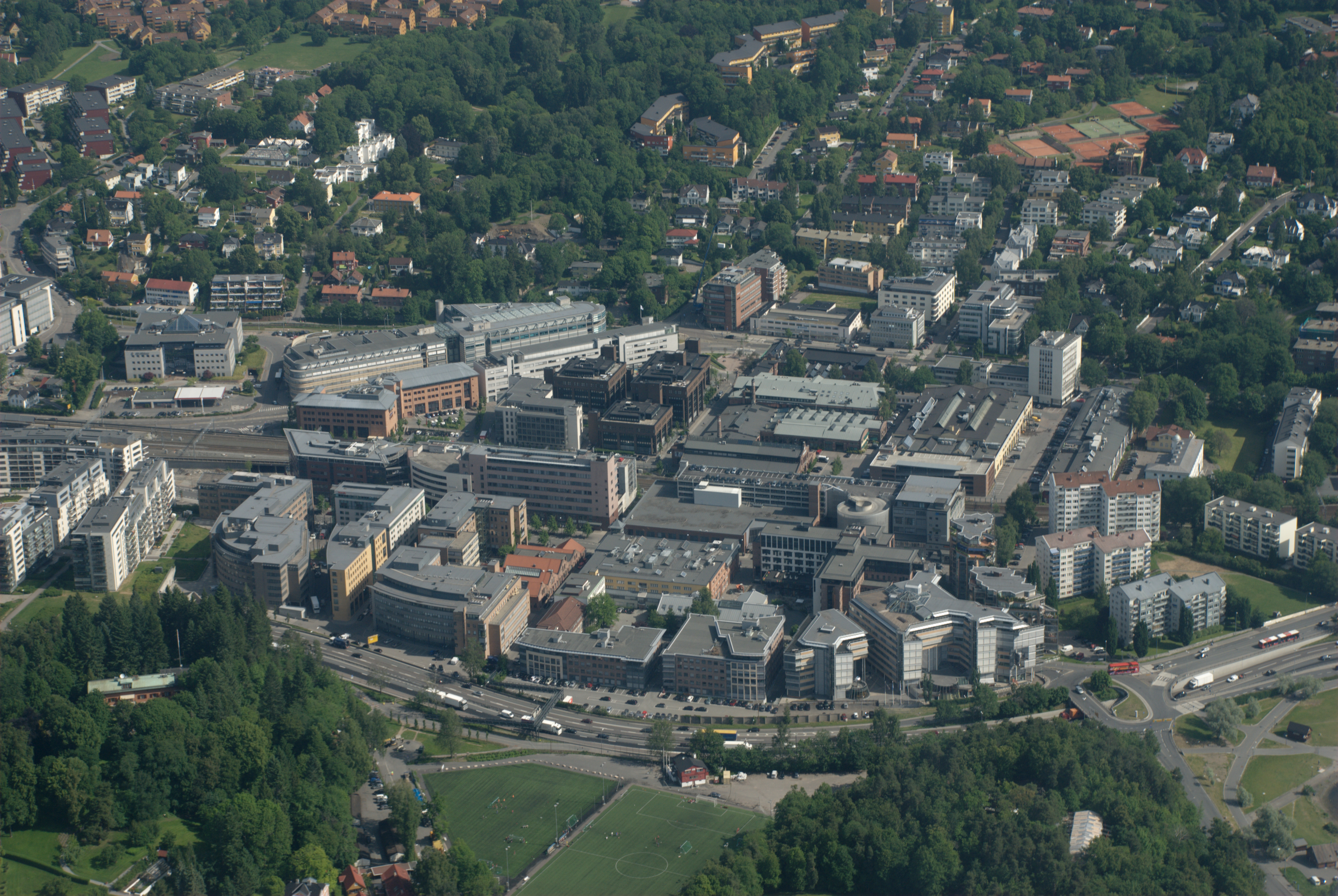
Aerial photography of Skøyen

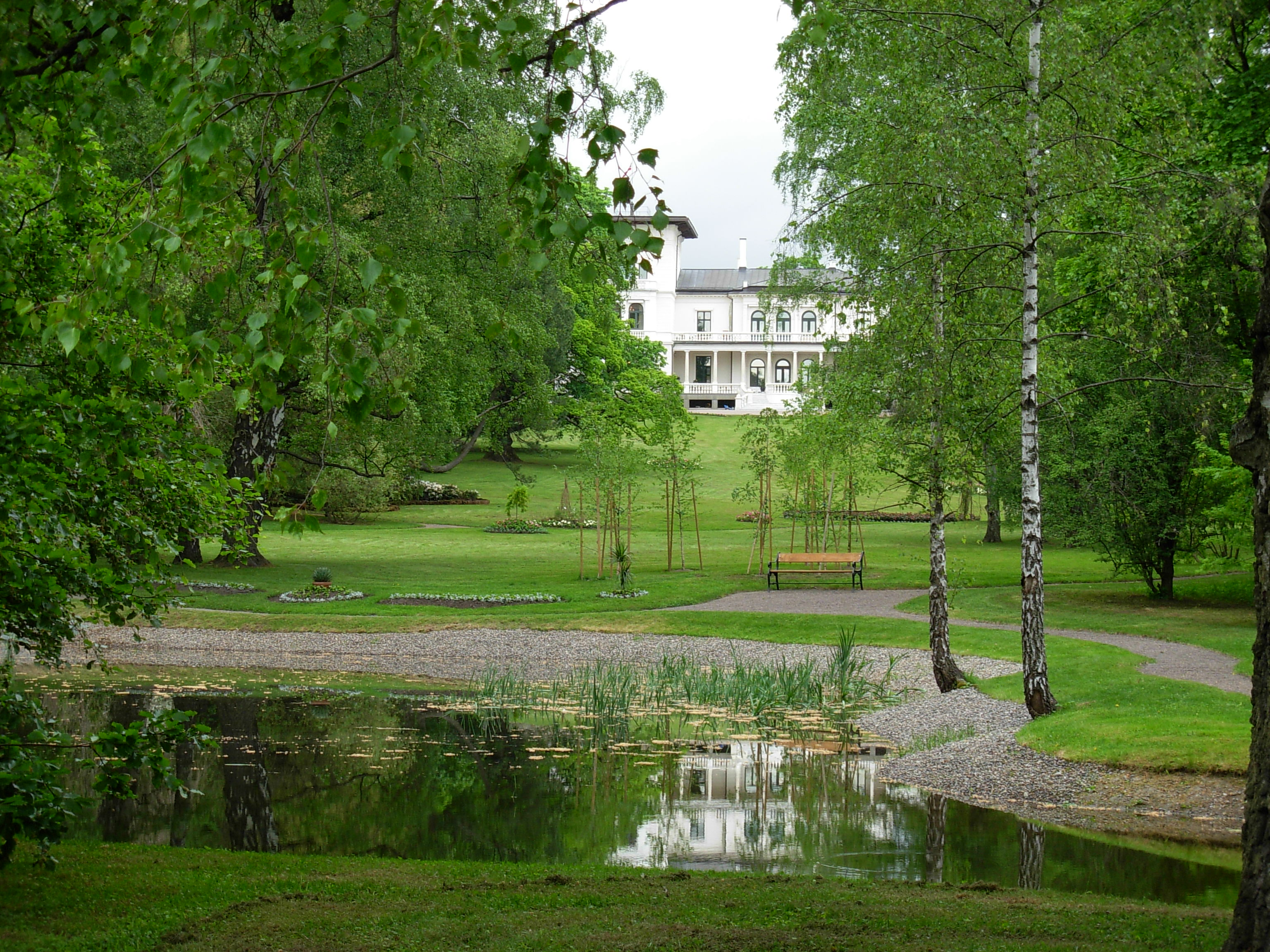
Skøyenparken in Skøyen

Skøyen is a neighborhood of Oslo, Norway. It is located in the western part of the city, in the borough of Ullern. The district has an increasing share of business activities, a development started in the 80s.

Skøyen is the site of Skøyenparken which surrounds Skøyen Manor (Søndre Skøyen). This estate was owned and developed by Nicolay August Andresen, chairman of Andresens Bank.

The name "Skøyen" comes from Old Norse Skǫðin, of unknown etymology. Skøyen is connected to downtown Oslo through The Skøyen Line (tram) and Skøyen Station (train).
