= Dual Edge Snowboard =

Technical categorization of a general snowboard concept and technology

The Dual Edge Snowboard (DES) is a technical categorization of a general snowboard concept and technology, where a device or mechanism creates two simultaneously ridden edges for a snowsport equipment that allows the user to ride in a similar fashion to the basic (classic) snowboard.

== Brief history ==
These systems have been around since the commercial beginning of snowboarding, circa 1984. Possibly the earliest successful attempt was the SwingBo. The SwingBo was created by the Struck brothers of Germany. The original equipment can still be found on internet auction sites or as the foundation for some paraplegic ski chairs.

Deuce Snowboards introduced a modern version of the DES that has undergone extensive engineering design and testing. According to Deuce Snowboards, the DES is the next evolutionary step of the snowboard, but it appears that they are evolving the ski sport as well.

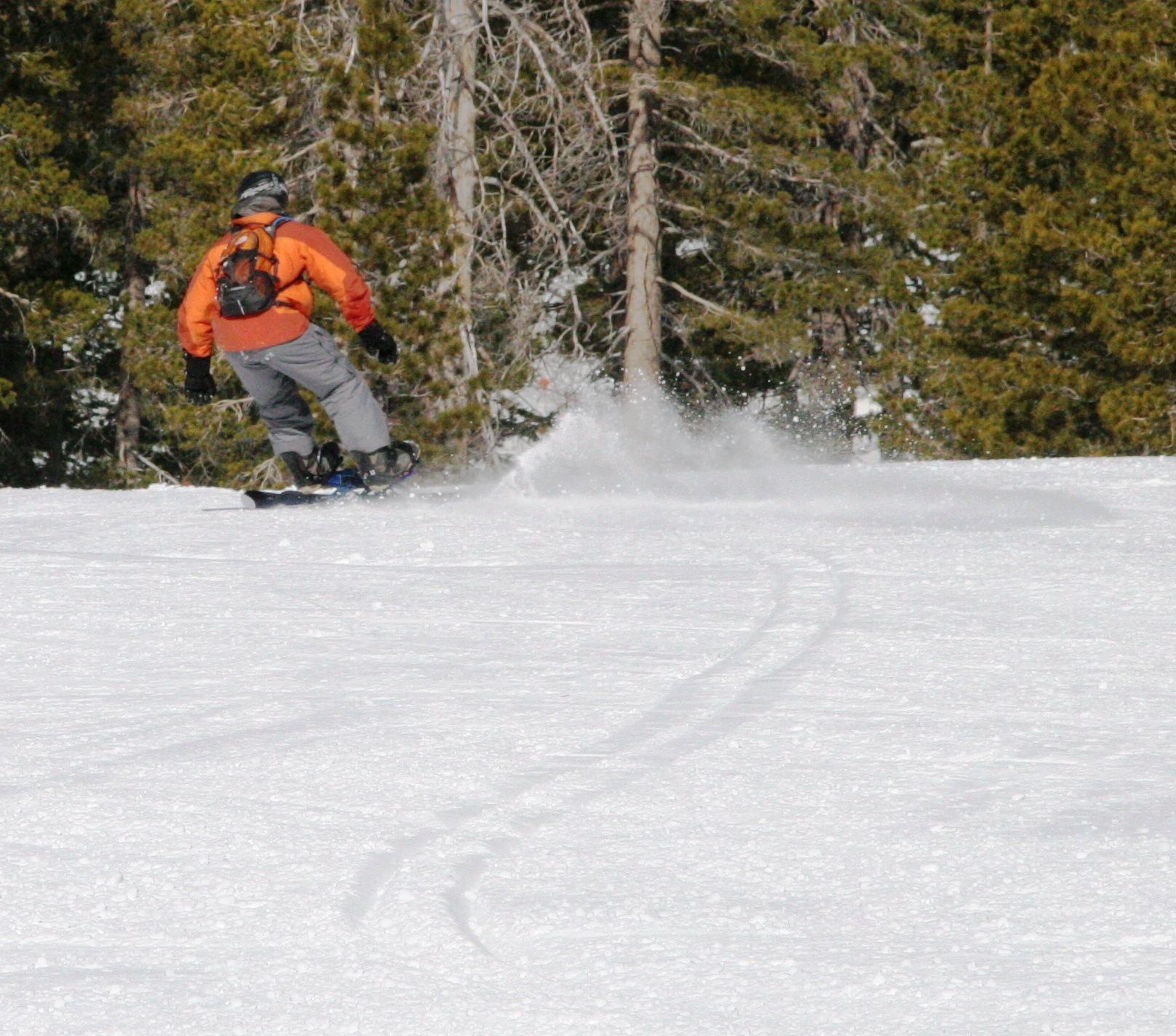
Board tracks showing the dual edge ride and control

There are various other attempts, which typically, were only patented, and were likely not technically or production viable. For example, one was a more modern version like the Deuce Snowboard, it was fundamentally based on a gear mechanism, instead of a four-bar mechanism on which the Deuce DES, and possibly, the SwingBo are based.

These systems are obviously a hybrid of skis and the classic snowboard, with the intent of delivering the advantages of both.

== DES compared to the Classic Snowboard ==
The majority of the DES designs have a few common features. First, they are two boards connected via a mechanism. Secondly, the mechanism comprises a mounting platform for the rider which is several centimeters (inches) above the top of the boards, and the mechanism attaches roughly to the longitudinal center of the boards. Since they all use only two boards, there appears to be no advantage to three or more.

=== Advantages ===
From Deuce Snowboards and anecdotal accounts of the SwingBo, the DES is predominantly about offering the "grip" that the classic snowboard lacks. This is audibly known by skiers as the scraping noise that is associated with snowboarders. This improved grip is also described as better control, which improves carve technique (shredding) and reduces stopping distance. Deuce Snowboards claims that the better carve is not only due to the additional edge, but also to the fact that the mechanism attaches to the longitudinal center, thus fully and uniformly flexing the boards similar to the design intent of parabolic skis. Plus, since the classic snowboard has a nonuniform flex, mainly characterized as insignificant flex between the riders feet, then the DES has more than twice as much edge control. Other advantages are also defined: seamless edge-to-edge transition, smoother ride, no toe/heel drag, better tip/tip flex and less chance of catching the leading edge.

=== Disadvantages ===
These systems' combined board weight can be roughly the same weight as a single snowboard. Since the total system weight also includes a mechanism, then these systems are likely to always be heavier than the classic snowboard due to the added mechanism. The Deuce DES mechanism's mass is around 3 kg (weighs around 7 pounds). Since the classic snowboard has a mass between 3 and 5 kg (6 to 11 pounds), then the mechanism doubles the weight.

Stationary (not moving) balance is reportedly more difficult with the Deuce DES, whereas this seems to have been less of an issue with the Swingbo.

== Style of Ride ==
There are several styles or forms of snowboarding. The Half-Pipe and Park Freestyle are the most published forms, but they and All-Mountain (back country) are the least practiced on the mountain. Following is a table that presents these three forms, along with the other two differentiable forms, in terms of the top two parameters that define a preference or aversion to a DES as compared to the classic snowboard. These two parameters are the importance of control and the importance of weight, respectively.

Style Type	Importance of Control	Importance of Weight
Half-Pipe	High	High
Freestyle Parks	Low	High
Freeride	High	Medium
Alpine	High	Low
All-Mountain	High	Medium

This indicates that Free-Ride, Alpine and All-Mountain riders might prefer the DES over the classic snowboard, but this has yet to be determined. It is possible that the nascent interest in the Snowboard cross (SBX) and the shift to event indicates an undercurrent of preference.

== Construction ==
At this time, only the Deuce DES is a reference for the design parameters and construction, thus the following are Deuce DES specific.

=== Boards ===
The lay-up construction of the boards is almost identical to the classic snowboard, the significant difference is the thickness profile, which is commonly known as the "flex pattern". The following four board parameters are presented as the variations from the classic parameters:

- Length - 156,160, and 165 are the current lengths.
- Waist Width - The board waists are around 120mm, whereas the system is around 340mm.
- Sidecut - Since the boards uniformly flex, they do not need as dramatic (small) of a sidecut radius as the classic snowboard. The DES sidecut radius is equivalent to the radii used by parabolic skiis, 14m. Also, the narrow width increases the sidecut length on the order of 10–15 cm.
- Flex - The flex pattern is a uniform bending from the mechanism out.
- Tail/Nose Width - They are around 150 mm. Since the boards are half as wide, that causes the tip geometry to change and the sidecut length to increase.

=== Mechanism ===
The mechanism is a difficult engineering challenge. First, the mechanism experiences very high moment loads due to the various lever arms through which a riders mass is transferred. However, the design must be as light as possible, while being affordable. Thus, it must have a very high strength to weight ratio that is cost effective. One of the ways the Deuce DES achieves this is by using 7075-T6 Aluminum throughout the mechanism.

The second design challenge is the bearing assemblies. The bearing surfaces must survive high loads (jump landing) and a large number of cycles (years of turning), but they must do this in a harsh environment of water, ice and wind, and again the solution must be affordable. The Deuce DES uses stainless steel pins riding in Teflon coated bushings.
