= Extreme carving =

Extreme carving or Extremecarving is a coined term describing a particular form of carving on a snowboard. Features of extreme carving that distinguish it from other kinds of snowboard carving include:

- The use of wider boards to accommodate extreme edge angles (the angle between board base and snow surface) produced deep in turns. Heel and toe overhang prevent narrower boards from reaching angles close to 90 degrees that are experienced in extreme carving.
- High degree of extension to the whole of the body during the middle of the carved turn, when the snowboard is facing down the fall line of the slope.
- Proactive compression of the body during edge transitions. This maneuver is also known as a cross-through or push-pull turn. During any carved turn on a sufficiently steep slope, the perceived g-force will build up at the end of the carve, resulting in a natural compression of the body. The proactive compression in extreme carving is different from this natural compression in that it is done by pulling the legs up in anticipation of the additional force, instead of allowing the legs to get pushed up as a reaction to the additional force. The snowboarder pushes the board away at the apex of the turn, and the g-force is also distributed along the whole arc of the turn, reducing the pressure on the leg at the turn exit, thus allowing the exit of the turn and the preparation of the next turn with legs flexing again (the pull sequence).
- Large, progressive rotation of the torso in the turning direction, such that the rider's shoulders and chest are perpendicular to the toe edge during toe-side turns, and facing towards the nose of the board during heel-side turns. This is in contrast with contemporary carving methodology that indicates that one's torso should stay at an angle midway between the angles of the two bindings, and also with the old school technique where the torso faces the nose of the board at all times.
- Minimum use of arms and non-necessary movements: the goal is to create a precise and perfect turn with a style that shows control and mastery of all the parameters at stake.

== History ==
Belonging to the Alpine snowboard type, it has its roots from an evolution of the Euro Carve, or Vitelli turn, also called V-turn, that was pioneered by early snowboarders in the late '80s in the west Alps (Jesse Fernandes, Jean Nerva, Serge Vitelli and other pro slalom riders). The laid carving technique was slowly improved by two Swiss snowboarders, Jacques Rilliet and Patrice Fivat away from the trends in Zinal, Valais by using the rotation turn technique used in the Swiss Snowboard school, and the term Extremecarving was used by them to describe the fact that the laid technique pushes the body to the maximum possible contact with the snow. They created in 2001 a website that explained the technique and it led to a growing international community of riders using this riding technique, among others for riding alpine snowboards.
