= Snowskate =

Snow sliding device

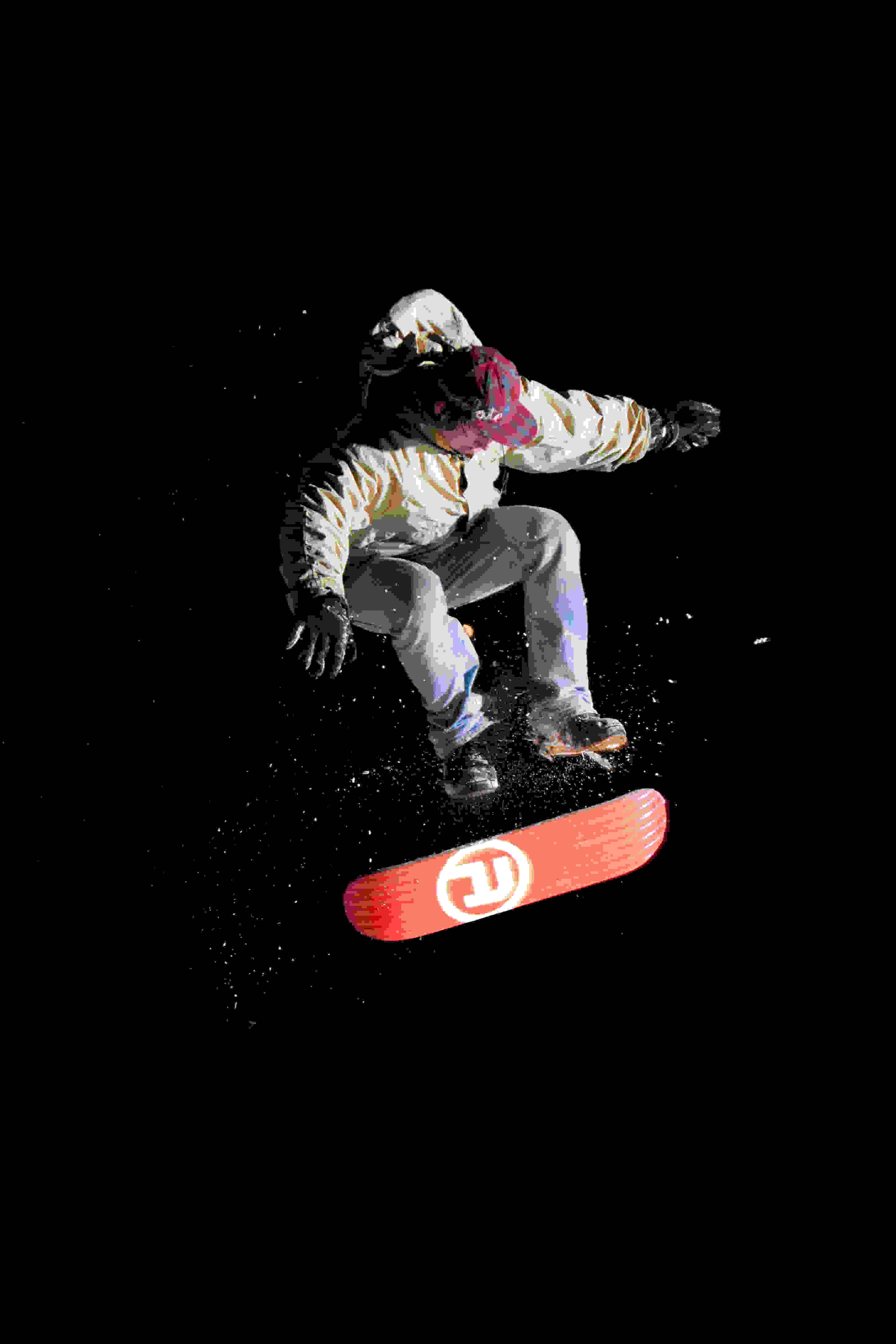
Snowskating combine elements of snowboarding and skateboarding to create a new experience which is most closely described as skateboarding on snow.

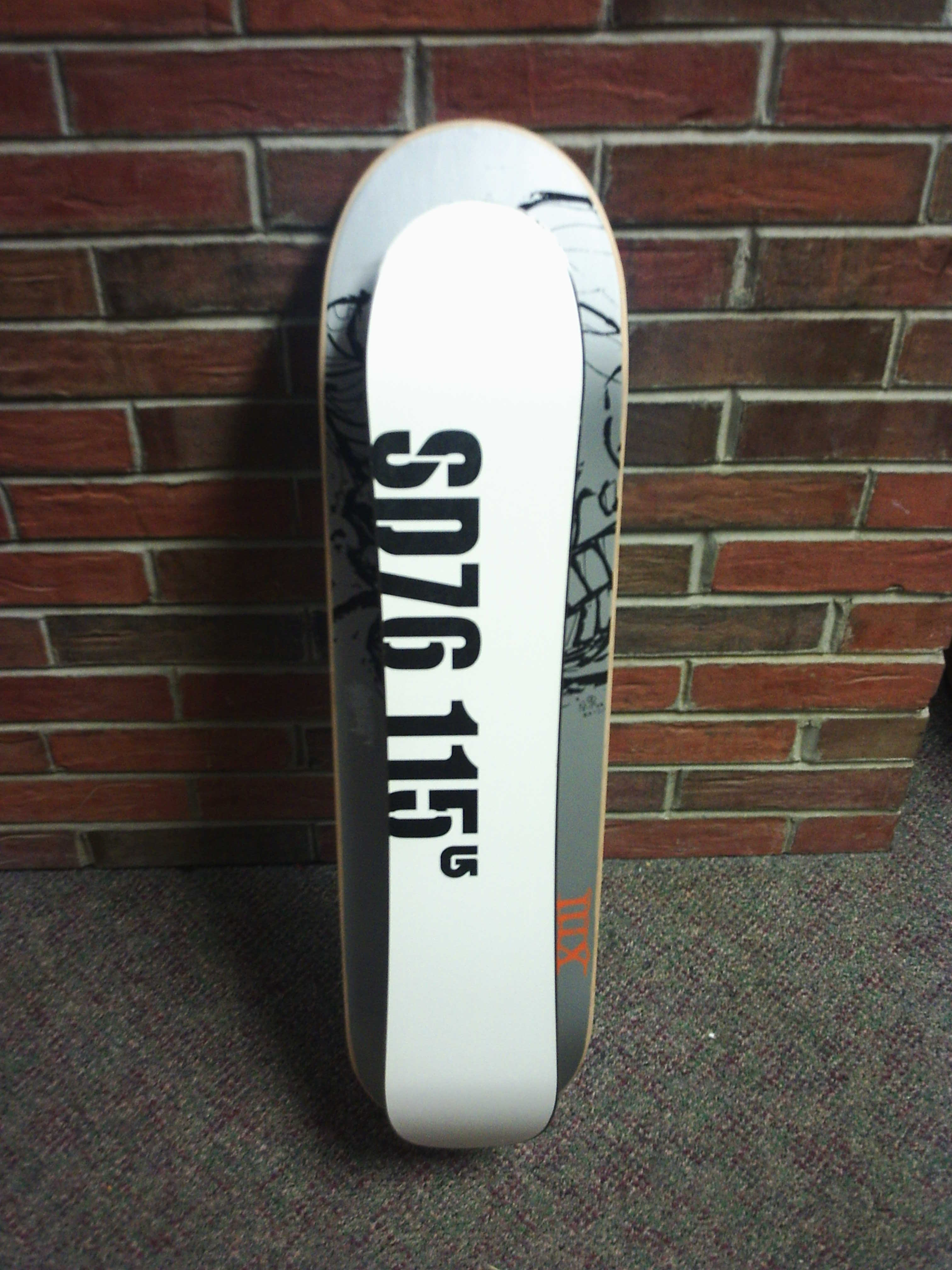
Snowskate (Snowdeck) – "Burton Junkyard"

A snowskate is a snow sliding device which can be described as a hybrid of a snowboard, and a skateboard. Unlike a snowboard which uses bindings to secure the board to a riders feet, a snowskate is typically bindingless. The lack of bindings allows the rider to perform more skateboard-like flip tricks on the snow as opposed to what can be done on a traditional snowboard. Although the bindingless nature of the snowskate allows for the aforementioned skateboard-like tricks, snowskates can also be ridden in a style similar to traditional snowboarding, but with the added challenge and freedom of riding and carving bindingless. There are many types of snowskates depending on the brand and styling of riding, but the most common are single deck and bi-level snowskates.

== Single deck snowskate ==
Single deck snowskates are usually made out of laminated wood with a plastic bottom or are made of solid plastic, There are grooves cut into the bottom of the board, usually 7 or 5. Single decks are preferred for riding in snowskate parks and urban terrain but can also be ridden down hills, however, they are rarely permitted on ski resorts. Snowskates of this kind are most suitable for winter skateboarding tricks.

Single deck snowskates first appeared on the market in 1998, manufactured by Premier Snowskates and marketed by Andy Wolf, former member of the Nitro snowboarding team. Today the primary manufacturers are: Ambition Snowskates, Hovland Snowskates, LY Snow and Krown Skateboards.

Snowskate parks became numerous when the first single deck snowskates were being sold in stores. Word of mouth quickly spread about the single deck snowskate, leading to the popularity of snowskate parks around United States.

The snowskate park moved snowskating from an urban underground winter sport to a mainstream winter sport. With the introduction of the snowboard, many resorts have removed their snowskate parks, and snowskating has moved back to its underground winter sport roots.

== Bi-level snowskate ==
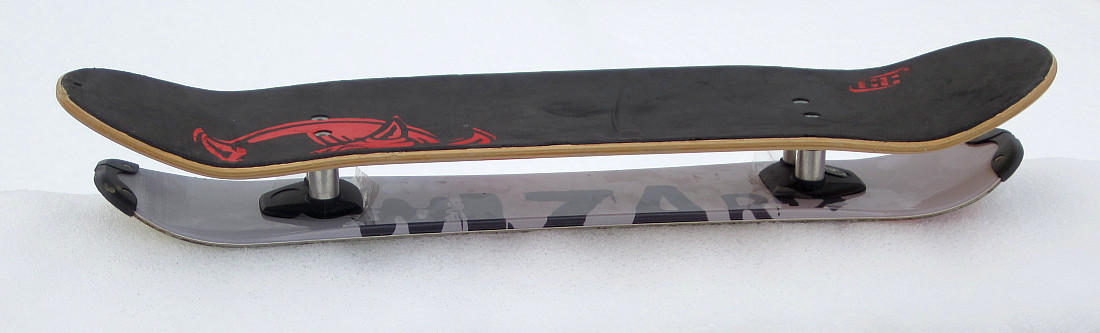
A bi-level snowskate

A bi-level snowskate, also called a bideck, or snowdeck, is a snowskate that has a skateboard top-deck which the rider stands on, connected through a set of "trucks" to a ski sub-deck, which is in contact with the snow. While few, if any, mountain ski resorts permit single deck snowskate riders on ski lifts, riders of bi-level snowskates which feature a leash to prevent runaway and a metal edged sub-deck are permitted on ski lifts in many mountain resorts such as Vail in Colorado. With no bindings and no special boots needed, a snowskate can be the most affordable way to shred your local hill or mountain.

Bi-level snowskates were reportedly invented by a Stevens Pass (Washington) local named Steve Frink. He came up with the idea of a skateboard with skis in 1994 while burning his skateboard in a skateboarders' ritual. In the year 2001, after many prototypes, he completed a final and finished product which he marketed under the brand "Bi-Deck Snowskates". Around the same time, snowboard manufacturer Burton Snowboards released the "Snowdeck". Burton has since stopped making snowskates.

The World Championships of Snowskating was held on April 20, 2024 at Solheisen in Hemsedal, Norway with 40 competitors representing 8 countries: Norway, Sweden, Germany, Lichtenstein, El Salvador, USA, Canada, and South Africa.

Bi-level snowskates differ depending on the style of riding with longer sub-decks favored for speed and carving and shorter sub-decks favored for tricks and stunts. Some current bi-level snowskate manufacturers are Hovland, Draw Snowskates, Parole Boards, Squampton Snowskates (eco-friendly, made with hemp), Harfang, Ralston, Pioneer, Fuse, florilda powderskate, 0910, Minus-7, Landyachtz, Chiller, LibTech and Boyd Hill. A complete list can be found at ItsASnowskate.Com

North American ski resorts which permit bi-level snowskates (with metal edge sub-deck and leash to prevent runaway) - Note: list is not complete - more info at ItsASnowskate.Com’s Resort Access List/Map and Guidebook
Resort Name	Location	Policy
Telluride	Colorado	Permitted
Crested Butte	Colorado	Permitted
Copper Mountain	Colorado	Permitted
Winter Park	Colorado	Permitted
Vail	Colorado	Permitted
Breckenridge	Colorado	Permitted
Steamboat	Colorado	Permitted
Aspen Snowmass	Colorado	Permitted
Beavercreek	Colorado	Permitted
Keystone	Colorado	Permitted
Granby Ranch	Colorado	Permitted
Eldora	Colorado	Permitted
Arapahoe Basin	Colorado	Permitted
Timberline	Oregon	Permitted
Mt Bachelor	Oregon	Permitted
Hoodoo	Oregon	Permitted, snowskate rentals also available
Park City	Utah	Permitted
Brian Head	Utah	Permitted
Snow Basin	Utah	Permitted
Mission Ridge	Washington	Permitted
Mt Baker	Washington	Permitted but limited certain lifts, requires foot strap for lift loading/unloading
Stevens Pass	Washington	Permitted
Summit at Snoqualmie	Washington	Permitted
Mt Spokane	Washington	Permitted
White Pass	Washington	Permitted
Bogus Basin	Idaho	Permitted
Silver Mountain Resort	Idaho	Permitted
Sun Valley Resort	Idaho	Permitted
Schweitzer	Idaho	Permitted
Brundage	Idaho	Permitted
Tamarack	Idaho	Permitted
Angel Fire	New Mexico	Permitted but limited to certain lifts
Mountain High	California	Permitted
Sierra at Tahoe	California	Permitted
China Peak	California	Permitted
Kirkwood	California	Permitted
Northstar	California	Permitted
Donner Ski Ranch	California	Permitted
Dodge Ridge Mountain Resort	California	Permitted but limited to certain lifts
Big Ski	Montana	Permitted
Whitefish	Montana	Permitted
Great Divide	Montana	Permitted
Blacktail	Montana	Permitted
Chester Bowl	Minnesota	Permitted, snowskate rentals also available
Crotched Mountain	New Hampshire	Permitted but limited to certain lifts
Mt Sunapee	New Hampshire	Permitted
Okemo	Vermont	Permitted
Mt Snow	Vermont	Permitted but limited to certain lifts
Hunter Mountain	New York	Permitted but limited to certain lifts
Seven Springs	Pennsylvania	Permitted
Whitetail Resort	Pennsylvania	Permitted
Liberty Mt Resort	Pennsylvania	Permitted
Roundtop Mt	Pennsylvania	Permitted

== Less Common Snowskates ==
=== 4x4 snowskate ===
The least common snowskate, 4x4 snowskates, provide the most skateboard like feel. They have four small skis, each replacing a wheel, and are generally very similar to average skateboards.

=== Powderskate ===
Powderskates are the most surf-like snowskate. They are usually longer and have a larger surface area to keep the rider afloat as it is used in deep powder. There are two varieties; single and bi-deck. The single deck is only for use in powder, and provides the most surf-like feel, whereas the bi-level snowskates provides more leverage, and can be used on and off the powder.

== History and design ==
The first snowskate traces its history to the Snurfer circa 1964. The Snurfer is considered to be the first snowboard to ever hit the market, but it could arguably be called the first snowskate, since it was without bindings. Joshua Luther first coined the phrase snowskate when he needed a way to get across town during a blizzard.

Around 1970, a product called the "Snow Skate" was sold in local toy and sporting good stores. They resembled the modern day Fuse snowskate. There were two ski-like apparatuses that were attached to the area around the truck of a skateboard, allowing the skateboard to move through the snow. The "Ski" portion of the snow skate is made of a hard plastic with rubber straps that went over the skateboard wheels to hold them together. Other mentionable early snowskate brands were The "Skeeter" and the "Snodad". Designs of this early era ranged from two skiblades on the lower deck (Like the Skeeter) to four blades on the lower deck. Sometimes, the early snowskates used metal runners, similar to ice skate blades, enabling the snowskater to use the momentum to ride well.

The "Snodad" came about much later in time. It was created by PNW skaters with the intent of riding fresh snow without bindings. Unfortunately the demise of the company came shortly after its official launch. It exists only as a historical "tip of the hat" to these pioneers of snowboarding without bindings.
