= Snowrider =

A snowrider is a winter sports enthusiast.

Snowriders may refer to:

- Skiers
- Sledders
- Snowboarders
