= Jake Burton Carpenter =

American snowboarder (1954–2019)

- Born: April 29, 1954; New York City, U.S.
- Died: November 20, 2019 (aged 65); Burlington, Vermont, U.S.
- Other name: Jake Burton
- Education: University of Colorado at Boulder; New York University
- Occupation: Snowboarder
- Spouse: Donna Gaston (m. 1983)
- Children: 3

Jake Burton Carpenter (April 29, 1954 – November 20, 2019), occasionally also known as Jake Burton or Jakie, was an American snowboarder, founder of Burton Snowboards, and one of the inventors of the modern day snowboard. A native of New York, he grew up in Cedarhurst, New York.

== Biography ==
Carpenter's high school education began in Brooks School North Andover, Massachusetts. After graduating from The Marvelwood School, at that time in Cornwall, Connecticut, he enrolled at the University of Colorado at Boulder. An avid skier, Carpenter hoped to join the university's ski team who were the reigning NCAA champions at the time, however his competitive skiing career ended after a serious automobile crash. After several years away from college, he resumed his studies at New York University, graduating with a degree in economics.

After college, Carpenter briefly worked for a small investment banking firm in Manhattan, Niederhoffer, Cross and Zeckhauser, Inc. (or NCZ for short), before growing tired of the 12-hour work days. He felt the call to return to the slopes. Working from a barn in Londonderry, Vermont, he improved on the Snurfer, a snowboard precursor which featured a rope to allow the rider some basic control over the board. In his interview with NPR's "How I Built This" when initially selling his snowboards, he said, "I remember once going out with 38 snowboards, visiting dealers in New York State and came back with 40 because one guy gave me two back he had bought." By the late-1970s, he was among a small cadre of manufacturers who had begun selling snowboards with design features such as a bentwood laminate core and a rigid binding which held the board firmly to the wearer's boot. In 1979, Carpenter won the Open Division and a $300 prize at the National Snurfing Contest in Muskegon, Michigan. Burton is credited with developing the economic ecosystem around snowboarding as a lifestyle, sport and culture, in addition to founding a premier board manufacturer. Burton has been one of the world's largest snowboard and snowboarding-equipment manufacturers since the late 1980s.

"Burton Snowboards" have several trademarked and copyrighted features that were filed under his name.

Carpenter's wife, Donna, served as CEO until 2020. He saw value in having women in positions of authority and leadership within the privately held company.

== Personal life ==
Carpenter resided in Stowe, Vermont, with his wife, Donna.

On February 17, 1967, Carpenter's brother, Corporal George Carpenter died serving in Vietnam. Four years later, in 1971, Carpenter's mother Katherine died of leukemia leaving behind Carpenter, his father, and two sisters.

Carpenter met his future wife Donna Lynn Gaston, then a student at Barnard College, at a 1981 New Year's Eve party at the Mill Tavern in Londonderry, Vermont. She is the owner and chairwoman of the Burton snowboard company and, upon Burton's death in 2019, served for a year as CEO. Gaston was originally from New York City but traveled from New York to the house in Manchester, Vermont where Jake was making the prototypes of snowboards. The dining room was his store and the basement was where the boards got packed for shipping. On May 21, 1983, they married in Greenwich, Connecticut.

By 1985, Carpenter and his wife moved to Austria to create a European base, where his wife focused on the distribution arm.

About four years later, they had their first child in Rutland, Vermont. Their second son was born in Burlington and their third son was born in 1996.

In 2012, Carpenter became an inaugural inductee to the Vermont Sports Hall of Fame. Carpenter survived several health scares in his later years: knee injuries, testicular cancer, pulmonary embolism and notably, the Miller Fisher variant of Guillain–Barré syndrome, a rare and serious neurological disorder. Carpenter died November 20, 2019, in Burlington, Vermont, after announcing recurrence of his cancer to Burton staff earlier in the month.
