= Powder surfing =

Powder surfing, also known as powsurfing and often spelled as one word e.g. "powdersurfing", is the act of surfing on snow free of any form of bindings and without the aid of ropes, hooks or bungee cords. Powdersurfing is performed on "powsurfer" which is a specially designed board engineered to be controlled using only the rider's feet and balance. This birth of style of riding was inspired by powder snowboarding, surfing and skateboarding. The lack of any bindings or bungee ropes along with the design of the boards allow riders to bring movements and tricks from surfing and skateboarding onto the snow. Much like surfing, the only connection between the board and the rider is a leash to prevent runaway equipment should the rider fall. Powder surfing is closely related to snowskating in its fundamentals, style and required skill. Powder surfing was sometimes confused with Noboarding while in its infancy but the two are quite different both in fundamentals, equipment used, and the skill required to ride them. Noboarding is performed on a typical snowboard using a kit that includes a rubber pad and bungee cords that are anchored to the board and held in the hand of the rider to hold the board to the riders feet and make the board turn. Noboarding and the kit called the "noboard pad" was pioneered by Greg Todds. In contrast, powdersurfing and snowskating are performed completely binding free and hands free on specially crafted boards that are designed to be ridden without the aid of any ropes or binding.

The terms "powdersurfer" and "powdersurfing" were coined by Jeremy Jensen in 2007 to describe, name and market the bindingless boards that he was handcrafting specifically to be ridden without any forms of binding, bungee, rope or hooks. Jensen founded Grassroots Powdersurfing, the first company specializing in the creation of powdersurfers and the act of riding powder completely hands free and binding free. Following the advent of powdersurfing and snowskating the act of riding completely binding free and hands free has gained popularity and acceptance worldwide.
