= FASE =

Snowboard binding system

- Founded: 2018; 8 years ago
- Website: www.fasesystem.com

FASE (or the Fast Entry System) is a step-in snowboard binding mechanism that accelerates the process of strapping in and out. Unlike some quick-entry setups, it remains fully compatible with regular snowboard boots and standard two-strap configurations.

== Overview ==
FASE was initially developed in 2018 and was later released during the mid-2020s. The FASE mechanism is considered to be an alternative entry snowboard binding. Rather than manufacturing complete bindings exclusively, the company licenses its technology to various snowboard manufacturers to be incorporated into specific models.

The design preserves the classic toe and ankle straps of standard bindings but alters the mechanical process for securing the boot. Because it utilizes these standard straps, the snowboard industry classifies FASE as a modified two-strap interface, distinguishing it from rear-entry designs, strapless setups, or step-ins that require specialized boots.

FASE licenses its hardware to other snowboard equipment companies. The companies integrate the FASE mechanism into their existing binding architecture in their snowboards.

FASE has been noted for its ability to minimize the time riders spend strapping in.

== Use by snowboarders ==
Snowboarders who have tested, endorsed, or actively competed using bindings equipped with FASE hardware include Jeremy Jones, Ståle Sandbech, Pat Fave, Chris Bradshaw, among others. Sandbech has also won a victory at the Natural Selection Tour while riding with the system.

== Criticism ==
A few distinct drawbacks have been noted for FASE. For instance, the binding's buckles can become immovable if they freeze, and the horizontal highback design introduces a somewhat clunky feel.
