= Kemper Snowboards =

American snowboard manufacturer

Kemper Snowboards is an American snowboard manufacturer. The first Kemper Snowboards were handmade in Ontario, Canada by David Kemper in 1983 and the company became officially incorporated in 1987.

Kemper Snowboards went out of business in the mid-1990s. As of 2018, Kemper Snowboards was relaunched in Park City, Utah by former pro snowboarder, Jib Hunt. Kemper Snowboards produces freestyle snowboards, park snowboards, powder snowboards, and splitboards.

== History ==
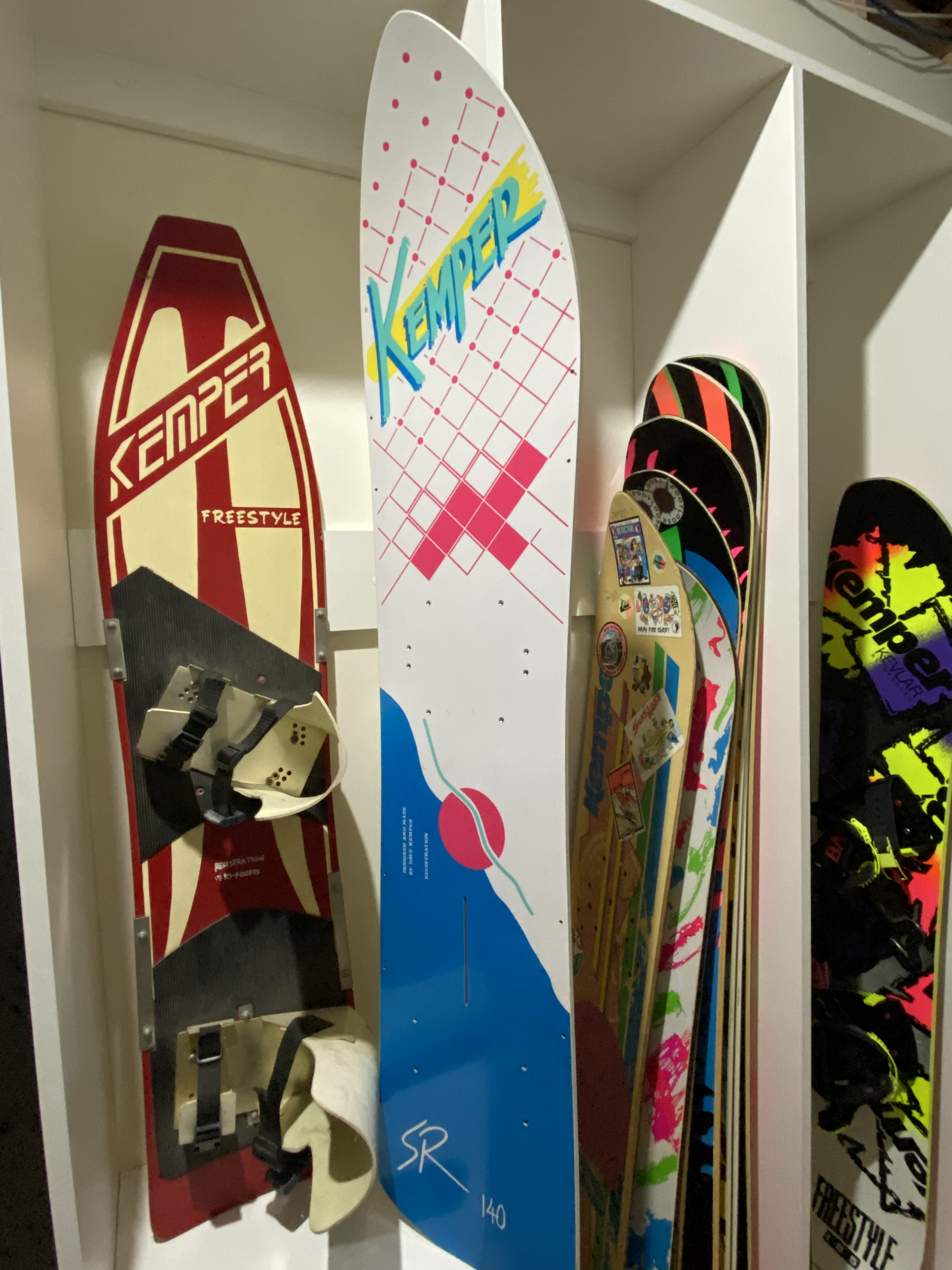
The first two snowboard models created by David Kemper

Kemper Snowboards was officially founded in 1987 by David Kemper who built the first boards in his garage in Ontario, Canada dating back to the winter of 1984/85. Once the brand started to gain momentum, Kemper moved its board production to a snowboard factory in Montreal, Canada for the 1988/89 snowboarding season. In 1989/90 the snowboard production moved to Austria.

Kemper Snowboards quickly rose in popularity in snowboarding brands in the industry. The Kemper brand was best remembered for fully embracing snowboarding's neon period in both their snowboard graphics and their incredible range of funky outerwear.

David Kemper eventually partnered with a windsurfing distribution company in Glendale, California called the Romney Group who added Kemper Snowboards to their portfolio of brands. During that time, David relocated to California to help oversee the business, team management, and the growing product line. In 1992, David sold his remaining shares of the company to focus on his college education.

By 1994 the company was sold to an in-line skate company on the east coast. A couple of years shortly after, Kemper Snowboards officially went out of business.

In the winter of 2018, Jib Hunt, a former professional snowboarder, relaunched the Kemper Snowboards brand. In the summer of 2019, Hunt moved Kemper's headquarters from the east coast to Park City, Utah to better position the snowboarding brand for growth and exposure within the Utah snowboarding scene.

Kemper Snowboards original professional snowboard team consisted of Mike Basich, Tina Basich, Dave Dowd, Martin Gallant, Kurt Heine, Andy Hetzel, Brett Johnson, Adam Merriman, Ursula Nygaard, George Pappas, Nick Perata, J.D. Platt, Rich Varga, and Jay Quintin (Smokin' Jay).

== Marketing and Promotion ==
In order to attract rider interest, Kemper Snowboards sponsors professional riders and events. The current Kemper Snowboards professional snowboard team consists of Kurt Heine, Martin Gallant, Kevin Jones, Ryan Flaska, Seth Hill, Aiden Chmura, Derek Henderson, and Jonat Ste-Marie
