= Snowboard =

Winter sport equipment

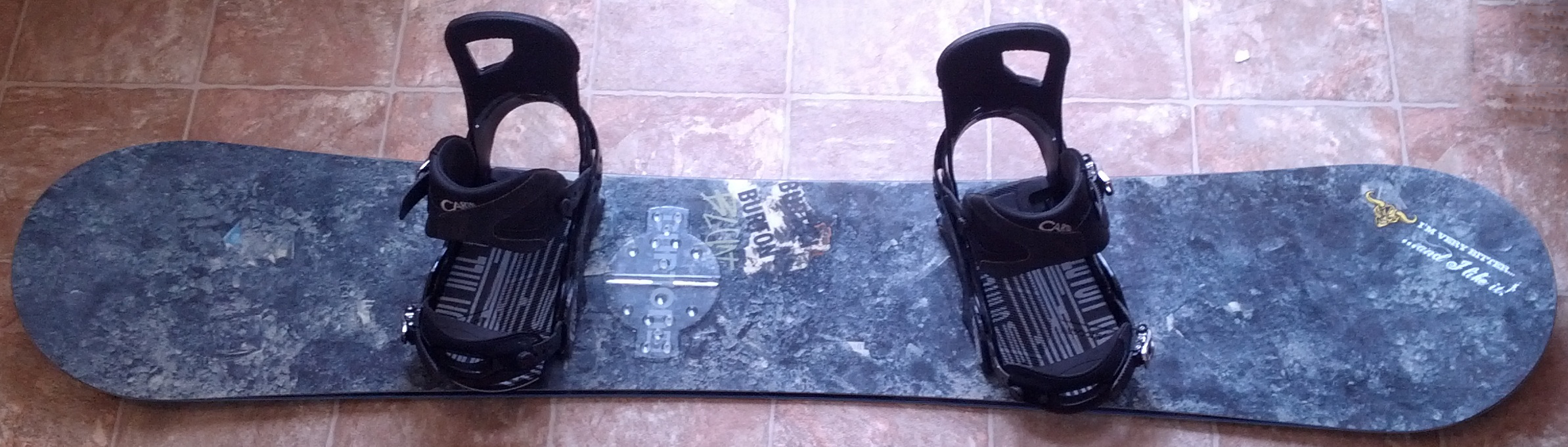
A snowboard with strap-in bindings (duck stance) and stomp pad

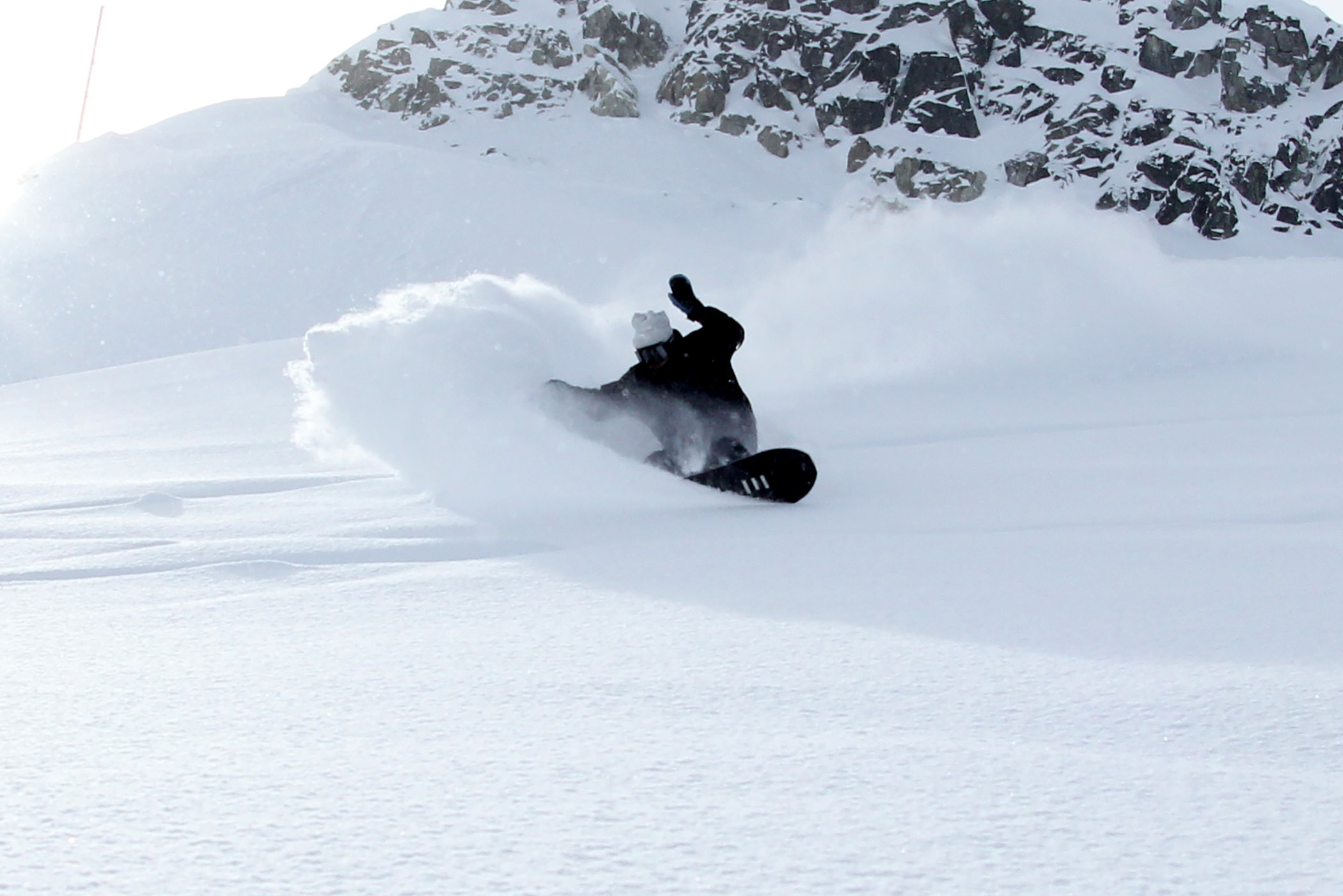
A snowboarder riding powder

A snowboard is a specially designed board used for the winter activity snowboarding, where the rider places both feet on a single board, typically secured with bindings. Unlike skis, which are used in pairs, a snowboard is a single, wider piece of equipment that allows the user to glide smoothly over snow-covered surfaces. The width and shape of the board provide stability and control, enabling riders to perform various maneuvers, turns, and tricks on different types of terrain, including groomed slopes, powder, and terrain parks. Snowboards widths are between 6 and 12 inches or 15 to 30 centimeters. Snowboards are differentiated from monoskis by the stance of the user. In monoskiing, the user stands with feet inline with direction of travel (facing tip of monoski/downhill) (parallel to long axis of board), whereas in snowboarding, users stand with feet transverse (more or less) to the longitude of the board. Users of such equipment may be referred to as snowboarders. Commercial snowboards generally require extra equipment, such as bindings and special boots which help secure both feet of a snowboarder, who generally ride in an upright position. These types of boards are commonly used by people at ski hills, mountains, backcountry, or resorts for leisure, entertainment, and competitive purposes.

== History ==
Riding a sliding plank of wood while standing was a skill demonstrated on the Turkish lazboard or toboggan in winters before 1900.

In 1917, 13 year old Vern Wicklund crafted a homemade board used for sliding on snow in Cloquet, Minnesota. This modified sled was dubbed a “bunker”. He, along with relatives Harvey and Gunnar Burgeson, patented the very first snowboard twenty two years later in 1939.

Sherm Poppen from Muskegon, Michigan came up with what most consider the direct predecessor of the snowboard in 1965 called the Snurfer (a blend of "snow" and "surfer"). Commercially available Snurfers in the late 1960s and early 1970s had no bindings. The rider held onto a looped nylon lanyard attached to the front of the Snurfer, and stood upon several rows of square U-shaped staples that were partially driven into the board but protruded about 1 cm above the board's surface to provide traction even when packed with snow. Later Snurfer models replaced the staples with ridged rubber grips running longitudinally along the length of the board (originally) or, subsequently, as rectangular footpads. Dimitrije Milovich led the Winterstick company from 1972–1982 and 1985–1987, and obtained a 1974 patent. It is widely accepted that Jake Burton Carpenter (founder of Burton Snowboards) and/or Tom Sims (founder of Sims Snowboards) invented modern snowboarding by introducing bindings and steel edges to snowboards in the late 1970s. Sims was an avid skateboarder in 1963 when he built a crude “ski board” in his seventh-grade wood shop class in Haddonfield, N.J., so he could continue to ride during the winter. Barfoot Snoboards was founded by Chuck Barfoot in 1981.

Snowboarding began to spread internationally. In 1981, a couple of Winterstick team riders went to France at the invitation of Alain Gaimard, marketing director at Les Arcs. After seeing an early film of this event, French skiers/surfers Augustin Coppey, Olivier Lehaneur, Olivier Roland and Antoine Yarmola made their first successful attempts during the winter of 1983 in France (Val Thorens), using primitive, home-made clones of the Winterstick. Starting with pure powder, skateboard-shaped wooden-boards equipped with aluminium fins, foot-straps and leashes, their technology evolved within a few years to pressed wood/fiber composite boards fitted with polyethylene soles, steel edges and modified ski boot shells. These were more suitable for the mixed conditions encountered while snowboarding mainly off-piste, but having to get back to ski lifts on packed snow. In 1985, James Bond popularized snowboarding in the movie A View to a Kill. In the scene, he escapes Soviet agents who are on skis with a makeshift snowboard made from the debris of a snowmobile that exploded. The actual snowboard used for the stunt was a Sims snowboard ridden by founder Tom Sims. By 1986, although still very much a minority sport, commercial snowboards had started appearing in French ski resorts.

Contemporaneously, the Snurfer was being turned into a snowboard on the other side of the iron curtain. In 1980, Aleksey Ostatnigrosh and Alexei Melnikov - two members of the only Snurfer club in the Soviet Union started changing the Snurfer design to allow jumping and to improve control on hard packed snow. Apparently unaware of developments in the Snurfer/snowboard world, they attached a bungee cord to the Snurfer tail which the rider could grab before jumping. Later, in 1982, they attached a foot binding to the Snurfer. The binding was only for the back foot, and had a release capability. In 1985, after several iterations of the Snurfer binding system, Aleksey Ostatnigrosh made the first Russian snowboard. The board was cut out of a single vinyl plastic sheet and had no metal edges. The bindings were attached by a central bolt and could rotate while on the move or be fixed at any angle. In 1988, OstatniGROsh and MELnikov started the first Russian snowboard manufacturing company, GROMEL

The first fibreglass snowboard with binding was made by Santa Cruz inventor Gary Tracy of GARSKI with the assistance of Bill Bourke in their factory in Santa Cruz in 1982. One of these original boards is still on display at Santa Cruz Skateboards in Capitola, CA. By the mid-80s, snowboarding had considerable commercial success with multiple competing companies. Burton had established a European Division by the mid-1980s. In Canada in 1983, a teenager named David Kemper began building his first snowboards in his garage in Ontario, Canada. By 1987, Kemper Snowboards was launched and became one of the top snowboard brands among Burton, Sims, and Barfoot.

The International Ski Federation (FIS) recognized snowboarding as a discipline in 1994. Snowboarding made its Olympic debut at the 1998 Nagano Winter Games. Men's and Women's halfpipe and giant slalom competitions were an instant success due to their overwhelming popularity with spectators. However, FIS was responsible for the scoring system and course design which were riddled with issues. FIS did not consult snowboarding pioneers and experts, and instead deciding to leave the contest rules and governing up to inexperienced FIS professionals. The giant slalom course was not properly maintained and the snowboarding events were scheduled right after the skiing events, which posed dangers to contestants due to ice and chop. At the 2002 winter games held in Salt Lake City, UT, FIS decided to consult US snowboard industry experts and together they made the competition safer for the athletes and added a viable scoring system. The 2006 Winter Games in Turin saw the addition of snowboard cross. Slopestyle events were added in 2014, and Big Air in 2018.

By 2008 snowboarding was a $487 million industry with average equipment costs running to around $540 for board, boots, and bindings.

== Board types ==
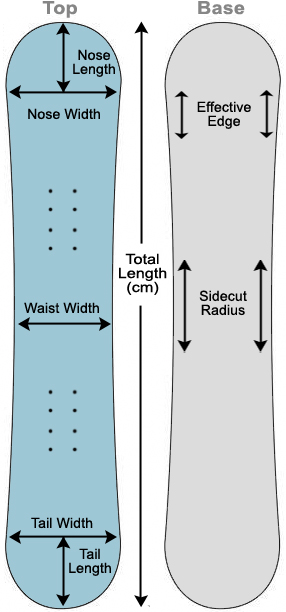
Diagram of a Snowboard and its various elements that affect sizing

The bottom or 'base' of the snowboard is generally made of UHMW and is surrounded by a thin strip of steel, known as the 'edge'. Artwork was primarily printed on PBT using a sublimation process in the 1990s, but poor color retention and fade after moderate use moved high-end producers to longer-lasting materials.

=== Styles ===
Snowboards come in several different styles, depending on the type of riding intended:

- Freestyle: Generally shorter with moderate to soft flex. Freestyle snowboards have a mirror shovel at each end of the board. Freestyle snowboards usually have low-backed bindings. Incorporates a deep sidecut for quick/tight turning. Used in the pipe and in the park on various jumps and terrain features including boxes, rails, and urban features.
- Park/Jib (rails): Flexible and short to medium length, twin-tip shape with a twin flex and an outward stance to allow easy switch riding, and easy spinning, a wider stance, with the edges filed dull is used for skateboard-park like snowboard parks.
- Freeride: Longer than freestyle and park boards. Moderate to stiff in flex and typically directional (versus twin-tip). Used from all-mountain to off-piste and backcountry riding, to 'extreme' big-mountain descents - in various types of snow from groomed hard-packed snow to soft powdery snow.
- Powder: Highly directional boards that typically have a rockered nose and tapered shape (wider tip than tail).
- All-Mountain: Most common. A mix between freeride and freestyle boards. The 'jack of all trades, master of none.' Commonly directional or directional twin in shape (twin-tip and centered stance but with more flex on the front)
- Racing/Alpine: Long, narrow, rigid, and directional shape. Used for slalom and giant slalom races, these boards are designed to excel on groomed slopes. Most often ridden with a "hard" plastic snowboard boot (similar to a ski boot), but also ridden recreationally with soft boots, particularly by riders in Europe.
- Splitboard: A snowboard which splits in half lengthwise, and allows the bindings to be quickly connected to hinges aligning them longitudinally on the board, allowing the halves of the boards to function as cross country skis. Used with removable skins on the base of the board, which easily slide forward on snow but not backwards, they allow a snowboard to easily travel into the backcountry. Once the rider is ready to descend, the board halves can simply be joined back together.

Snowboards are generally constructed of a hardwood core which is sandwiched between multiple layers of fibreglass. Some snowboards incorporate the use of more exotic materials such as carbon fiber, Kevlar, aluminium (as a honeycomb core structure), and have incorporated piezo dampers. The front (or "nose") of the board is upturned to help the board glide over uneven snow. The back (or "tail") of the board is also upturned to enable backwards (or "switch") riding. The base (the side of the board which contacts the ground) is made of Polyethylene plastic. The two major types of base construction are extruded and sintered. An extruded base is a basic, low-maintenance design which basically consists of the plastic base material melted into its form. A sintered base uses the same material as an extruded base, but first grinds the material into a powder, then, using heat and pressure, molds the material into its desired form. A sintered base is generally softer than its extruded counterpart, but has a porous structure which enables it to absorb wax. This wax absorption (along with a properly done 'hot wax'), greatly reduces surface friction between the base and the snow, allowing the snowboard to travel on a thin layer of water. Snowboards with sintered bases are much faster, but require semi-regular maintenance and are easier to damage. The bottom edges of the snowboard are fitted with a thin strip of steel, just a couple of millimeters wide. This steel edge allows the board to grab or 'dig into' hard snow and ice (like the blade of an ice skate), and also protects the boards internal structure. The top of the board is typically a layer of acrylic with some form of graphic designed to attract attention, showcase artwork, or serve the purpose similar to that of any other form of printed media. Flite Snowboards, an early designer, pressed the first closed-molded boards from a garage in Newport, Rhode Island, in the mid-1980s. Snowboard topsheet graphics can be a highly personal statement and many riders spend many hours customizing the look of their boards. The top of some boards may even include thin inlays with other materials, and some are made entirely of epoxy-impregnated wood. The base of the board may also feature graphics, often designed in a manner to make the board's manufacturer recognizable in photos.

=== Design differences ===
Snowboard designs differ primarily in:

- Length – Boards for children are as short as 80 centimetres (31 in); boards for racers, or "alpine" riders, are as long as 215 centimetres (85 in). Most people ride boards in the 140–165 centimetres (55–65 in) range. Board length used to be judged by the height of your chin. If a board held next to the frontside of your body came to your chin then it was an acceptable length. Due to the development of new technologies and board shapes, people can now ride a wider range of board sizes. Rather, the length of a snowboard corresponds mainly to the style, weight, and preference of the rider. A good rule of thumb is to stay within the recommended manufacturer weight range. The longer the board, the more stable it is at high speed, but it is also a bit tougher to maneuver. Another factor riders consider when selecting a snowboard is the type of riding it will be used for, freestyle boards being shorter than all-mountain boards.
- Width – The width is typically measured at the waist of the board, since the nose and tail width varies with the sidecut and taper. Freestyle boards are up to 28 centimetres (11 in) wide, to assist with balance. Alpine boards are typically 18–21 centimetres (7.1–8.3 in) wide, although they can be as narrow as 15 centimetres (5.9 in). Most folks ride boards in the 24–25 centimetres (9.4–9.8 in) range. Riders with larger feet (US size 10 and larger) may have problems with narrower boards, as the rider's toes and/or heels may extend over the edge of the board, and interfere with the board's ability to make turns once it is set on edge, or 'get hung up on the snow.' This is called toe/heel-drag, and can be cured by either choosing a wider board (26 centimetres (10 in) or more), adjusting the stance angle, or a combination of the two.
- Sidecut – The edges of the board are symmetrically curved concavely, so that the width at the tip and tail is greater than the center. This curve aids turning and affects the board's handling. The curve has a radius that might be a short as 5 metres (16 ft) on a child's board or as large as 17 metres (56 ft) on a racer's board. Most boards use a sidecut radius between 8–9 metres (26–30 ft). Shorter sidecut radii (tighter turns) are generally used for halfpipe riding while longer sidecut radii (wider turns) are used for freeride-alpine-racing riding. One new development in sidecuts was the introduction of Magne-Traction by Mervin, which manufactures: Lib Tech, GNU, and Roxy snowboards. Magne-Traction incorporates seven bumps on each side of the board which LibTech speculates will improve edge holding.
- Flex – The flexibility of a snowboard affects its handling and typically varies with the rider's weight. Usually a harder flex makes turning harder while a softer flex makes the board less stable at high speed. There is no standard way to quantify snowboard stiffness, but novices and boarders who mostly do rails tend to prefer softer flex, racers stiffer flex, and everyone else something in between. Park riders that enjoy jumps the most tend to ride stiffer twin boards.
- Tail and nose width – Many freestyle boards have equal nose/tail specs for equal performance either direction. Freeride and alpine boards, however, have a directional shape with a wider and longer nose. Boards designed for powder conditions exaggerate the differences even more for more flotation on the powder.
- Camber – The curvature of the base of the snowboard affects handling and carving. Typical modern snowboards have an upward curvature of a few degrees along the effective edges. Experimentation has led to boards with rocker, or upward curvature, which makes for a more buttery board and can improve float in deep powder. As time has progressed, modern boards now offer variations of camber-rocker boards that fulfill the different needs and preferences of its rider.

== Board construction ==
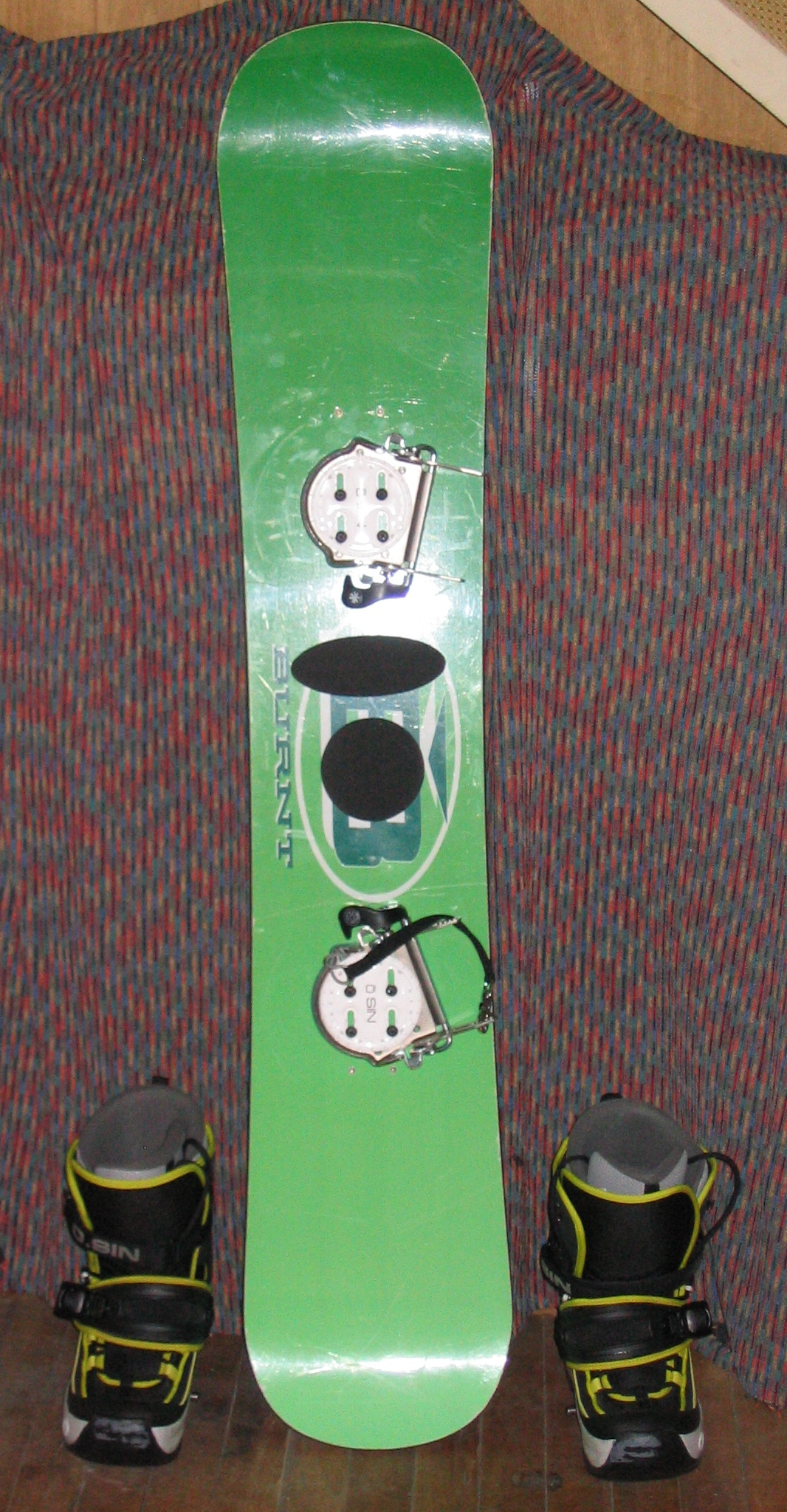
Snowboard with step-in bindings and boots

The various components of a snowboard are:

- Core: The interior construction of the snowboard. It is typically made of laminated fiberglass around wood. Beech and Poplar are the most common woods, though other woods are used such as bamboo and birch. There have been continued experiments with aluminum, composite honeycomb, foam and resin to change, or substitute, the standard wood core. Desired properties of the core include damping, rebound, strength, flex and reduced weight.
- Base: The bottom of the board that is in contact with the snow surface. It is generally made of a porous, plastic (polyethylene) material, that is saturated with a wax to create a very quick and smooth, hydrophobic surface. P-Tex is a brand name that has become synonymous with base material. It is important that the base be "slippery", with respect to the snow surface and board interaction. Bases are made to have amorphous areas that are porous to wax. Wax is an important finishing product for all base materials. Not only does it allow the snowboard to have a smoother glide, but it also allows the rider to change the characteristics of the base and adjust the board to the snow conditions. Different base waxes are available for different temperatures. The base, when maintained, will have a designed base structure that not only channels snow, air and water, but leaves it open enough for wax to penetrate deep inside it. This pattern is created with a stonegrind machine at the factory or a local ski shop. If the base is damaged, it is common to have it repaired in order to protect the core from exposure as well as reducing friction.

Extruded: The Polyethylene base material is cut from a large sheet, or squeezed out of a machine much like "Play-Doh". A low maintenance base, it is the least expensive and easiest to repair. Extruded bases are smoother and less porous than other bases. They do not saturate with wax well, and tend to slide slower than other bases. But left unwaxed they do not lose much overall performance. Extruded P-Tex is also cheaper than sintered P-Tex
Sintered: Polyethylene base material is ground to powder then reformed with pressure and heat, and cut to shape. A sintered base is very porous and absorbs wax well. Sintered bases slide faster than extruded bases when waxed, but will be slower if unwaxed for a period. They are more expensive, and harder to repair.
Sintered Hybrid: Sintered bases may have graphite, gallium, indium or other materials added. These materials are used increase glide, strength, "wax hold" and other desired characteristics.

- Edge: A strip of metal, tuned normally to just less than 90-degrees, that runs the length of either side of the board. This sharp edge is necessary to be able to produce enough friction to ride on ice, and the radius of the edge directly affects the radius of carving turns, and in turn the responsiveness of the board. Kinking, rusting, or general dulling of the edge will significantly hinder the ability for the edge to grip the snow, so it is important that this feature is maintained. However, many riders who spend a fair amount of their time grinding park rails, and especially handrails, will actually use a detuning stone or another method to intentionally dull their edges, either entirely or only in certain areas. This helps to avoid "catching" on any tiny burrs or other obstructions that may exist or be formed on rails, boxes, and other types of grind. Catching on a rail can, more than likely, result in a potentially serious crash, particularly should it occur on a handrail or more advanced rail set-up. In addition, it's relatively common for freestyle riders to "detune" the edges around the board's contact points. This practice can help to reduce the chances of the rider catching an edge in a choppy or rutted-out jump landing or similar situation. It is important to keep in mind that drastic edge detuning can be near-impossible to fully reverse and will significantly impede board control & the ability to hold an edge in harder-packed snow. One area where this can be quite detrimental is in a half-pipe, where well-sharpened edges are often crucially important for cutting through the hard, sometimes icy, walls.
- Laminate: The snowboard's core is also sandwiched on the top and bottom by at least two layers of fiberglass. The fiberglass adds stiffness and torsional strength to the board. The fiberglass laminate may be either biaxial (fibers running the length of the board and more fibers 90 degrees perpendicular to it), triax (fibers running the length of the board with 45 degree fibers running across it), or quadax (a hybrid of the biax and triax). Some snowboards also add carbon and aramid (also known as Twaron or Kevlar) stringers for additional elasticity and strength.
- Camber: Camber refers to the bend of the board from tip to tail. Traditionally boards have a raised camber, meaning that if one were to lay it flat the board comes off the ground between the spots where one's feet would be (contact points). In 2007 companies began to manufacture a number of new camber designs. All fall into these four main categories.

Regular: As described above the board flexes up when laid down flat. This is the original design and still the most widely used board form as it is the oldest.
Reverse: The exact opposite of regular. The board is bent upwards starting at the middle, so that when laid flat the nose and tail are significantly off the ground. This design is ideal for park and freestyle as it allows a much smoother 360-degree rotation on both snow and rails. When standing on the board it is flexed down at the contact points by your weight, but can easily be lifted by shifting your weight off either foot. Sims first released this design in 1985, however, it was popularized recently by companies such as Lib-Tech and K2 Snowboarding.
De-cambered: The idea is similar to "Reversed" but the lift doesn't start until after the contact points, making the board flat between your feet. This design works well in powder due to its naturally raised tips and its use of the entire edge when turning. The Kinked design also fares well in parks as it has the turning and spin benefits of the "Reverse" camber design. This design is the newest out of the four in terms of form.
Flat: The board is entirely flat from nose to tail. Because there is no curve these are better suited for casual free riding and most big-air features in park (big-air jumps/pipe).

- Production: There are some manufactures that perform the entire process of snowboard construction and they manufacture over 500 per day with at least 30 different models. There is a great amount of manual work that goes into it as opposed to all of it being performed by machines and robots.

== Boots ==
Snowboard boots are mostly considered soft boots, though alpine snowboarding uses a harder boot similar to a ski boot. A boot's primary function is to transfer the rider's energy into the board, protect the rider with support, and keep the rider's feet warm. A snowboarder shopping for boots is usually looking for a good fit, flex, and looks. Boots can have different features such as lacing styles, heat molding liners, and gel padding that the snowboarder also might be looking for. Tradeoffs include rigidity versus comfort, and built in forward lean, versus comfort.

There are three incompatible types:

- Standard (soft) boots fit "flow" and "strap" bindings and are by far the most common. No part of the boot specifically attaches to the board. Instead, the binding applies pressure in several places to achieve firm contact. Soft boots have a flexible outer boot and an inner bladder. The outer boot has a treaded sole. The inner bladder provides support and helps hold the heel of your foot in place.
- "Step in" boots have a metal clasp on the bottom to attach to "step in" bindings. The boot must match the binding.
- Hard boots are used with special bindings. They are similar to skier's boots. Hard boots are heavier than soft boots, and also have an inner bladder.

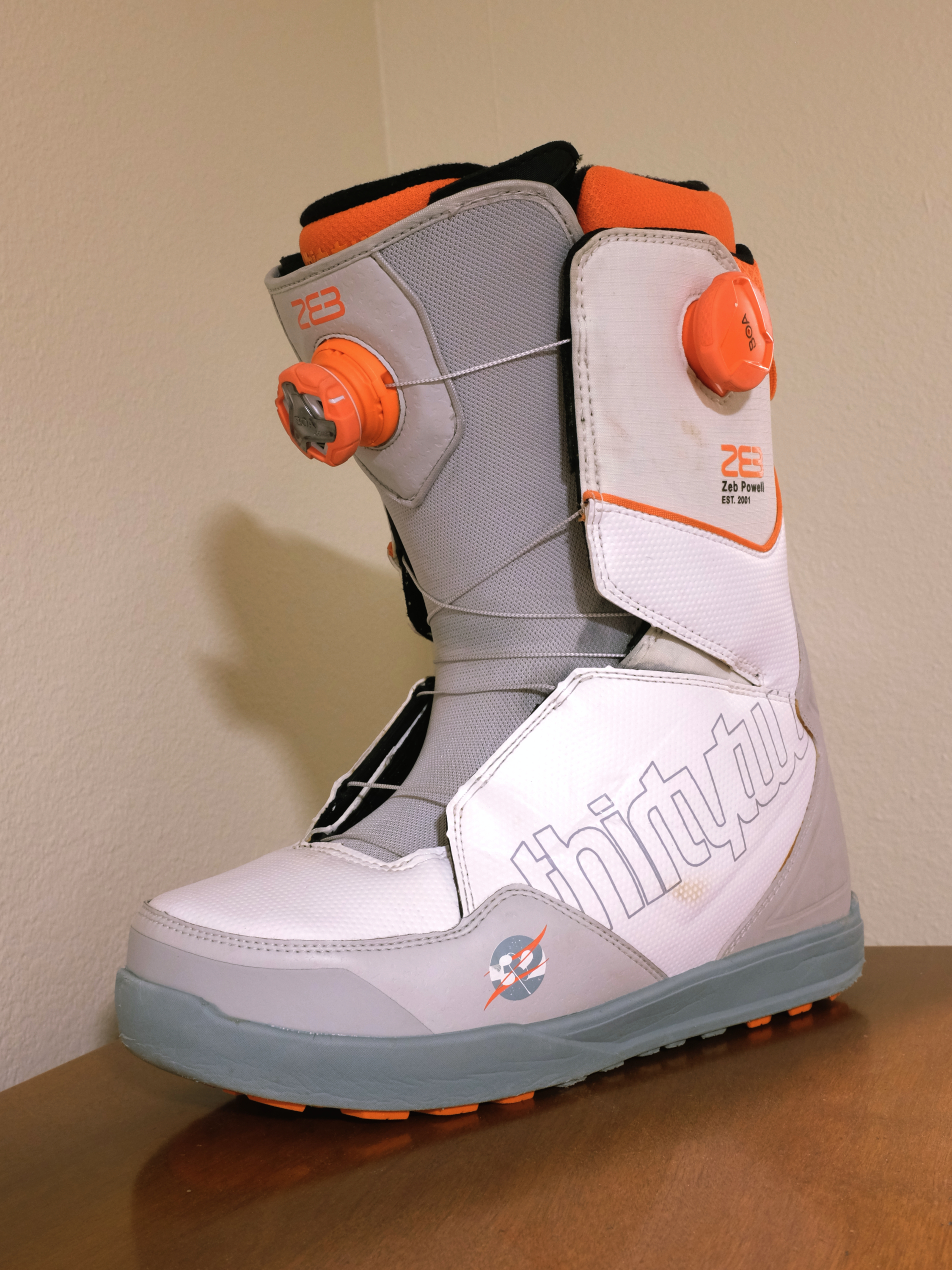
Snowboard boot with two BOA lace tensioners

There are 3 main lacing systems used in snowboarding boots: traditional laces, the BOA system (a thin metal cord that is tensioned by a ratcheting dial placed on the front or side of the boot), and the fast lock system (a thin cord that is pulled and slid into a locking hook). Boots may have a single lacing system, a single lacing system that tightens the foot and the leg separately, a single lacing system with some trick to pull down the front pad in the center as you tighten the boot, 2 combined lacing systems where one tightens the whole boot and the other tightens just the center (similar to the previous one) or 2 combined lacing systems where one tightens the lower part (your foot) and the other tightens the upper part (your leg).

== Bindings ==
Bindings are separate components from the snowboard deck and are very important parts of the total snowboard interface. The bindings' main function is to hold the rider's boot in place tightly to transfer their energy to the board. Most bindings are attached to the board with three or four screws that are placed in the center of the binding. Although a rather new technology from Burton called Infinite channel system uses two screws, both on the outsides of the binding.

There are several types of bindings. Strap-in, step-in, and hybrid bindings are used by most recreational riders and all freestyle riders.

=== Strap-in ===
These are the most popular bindings in snowboarding. Before snowboard specific boots existed, snowboarders used any means necessary to attach their feet to their snowboards and gain the leverage needed for turning. Typical boots used in these early days of snowboarding were Sorels or snowmobile boots. These boots were not designed for snowboarding and did not provide the support desired for doing turns on the heel edge of a snowboard. As a result, early innovators such as Louis Fournier conceived the "high-back" binding design which was later commercialized and patented by Jeff Grell. The highback binding is the technology produced by most binding equipment manufacturers in the snowboard industry. The leverage provided by highbacks greatly improved board control. Snowboarders such as Craig Kelly adapted plastic "tongues" to their boots to provide the same support for toe-side turns that the highback provided for heel-side turns. In response, companies such as Burton and Gnu began to offer "tongues".

With modern strap bindings, the rider wears a boot which has a thick but flexible sole, and padded uppers. The foot is held onto the board with two buckle straps – one strapped across the top of the toe area, and one across the ankle area. They can be tightly ratcheted closed for a tight fit and good rider control of the board. Straps are typically padded to more evenly distribute pressure across the foot. While nowhere near as popular as two-strap bindings, some people prefer three-strap bindings for more specialized riding such as carving. The third strap tends to provide additional stiffness to the binding.

Cap-strap bindings are a recent modification that provide a very tight fit to the toe of the boot, and seats the boot more securely in the binding. Numerous companies have adopted various versions of the cap strap.

=== Step-in ===
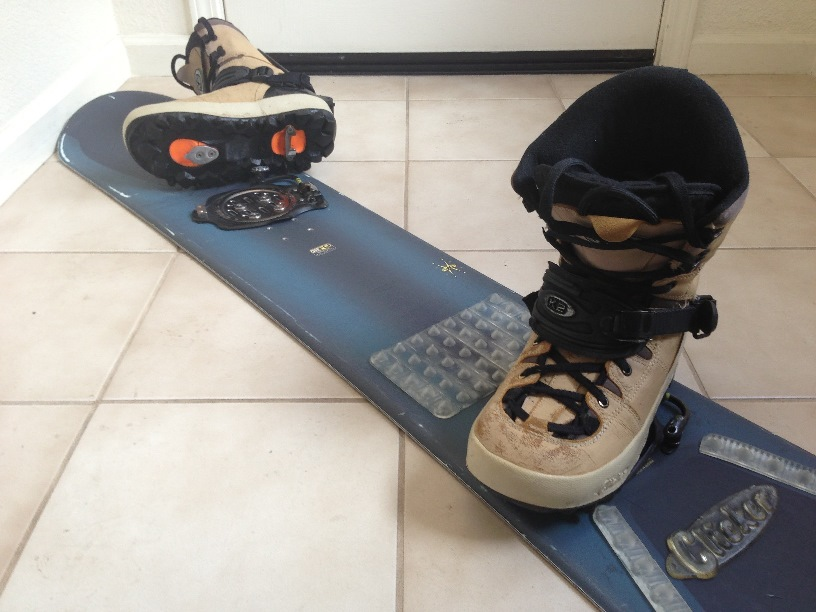
Snowboard, K2 Clicker step-in binding

Innovators of step-in systems produced prototypes and designed proprietary step-in boot and binding systems with the goal of improving the performance of snowboard boots and bindings, and as a result, the mid-90s saw an explosion of step-in binding and boot development. New companies, Switch and Device, were built on new step-in binding technology. Existing companies Shimano, K2 and Emery were also quick to market with new step-in technology. Meanwhile, early market leaders Burton and Sims were noticeably absent from the step-in market. Sims was the first established industry leader to market with a step-in binding. Sims licensed a step-in system called DNR which was produced by the established ski-binding company Marker. Marker never improved the product which was eventually discontinued. Sims never re-entered the step-in market.

The risk of commercial failure from a poorly performing Step-in binding presented serious risk to established market leaders. This was evidenced by Airwalk who enjoyed 30% market share in snowboard boot sales when they began development of their step-in binding system. The Airwalk step-in System experienced serious product failure at the first dealer demonstrations, seriously damaging the company's credibility and heralded a decline in the company's former position as the market leader in Snowboard boots. Established snowboarding brands seeking to gain market share while reducing risk, purchased proven step-in innovators. For example, snowboard boot company Vans purchased the Switch step-in company, while Device step-in company was purchased by Ride Snowboards.

Although initially refusing to expose themselves to the risk and expense associated with bringing a step-in system to market, Burton chose to focus primarily on improvements to existing strap-in technology. However, Burton eventually released 2 models of step-in systems, the SI and the PSI, Burton's SI system enjoyed moderate success, yet never matched the performance of the company's strap-in products and was never improved upon. Burton never marketed any improvements to either of their step-in binding systems and eventually discontinued the products. Most Popular (and incompatible) step-in systems used unique and proprietary mechanisms, such as the step-ins produced by Burton, Rossignol and Switch. Shimano and K2 used a technology similar to clipless bicycle pedals. By the early-to-mid 2010s, Burton, Rossignol, and K2 Clicker step-in binding systems were no longer in production as the companies had opted to focus on the strap-in binding system.

By the late 2010s and early 2020s, interest in alternative binding entry systems re-emerged, with newer designs aiming to address limitations identified in earlier step-in technologies. Snowboarders’ demand for faster and more convenient entry and exit compared to traditional two-strap bindings continued to influence product development. During this period, several distinct systems were introduced or reintroduced, including boot-specific step-in bindings, mechanically assisted rear-entry bindings, and modified two-strap systems that incorporate alternative entry mechanisms. Examples of contemporary approaches include Burton’s Step On system, Nidecker’s Supermatic binding, and the FASE Fast Entry System, each representing different design philosophies within the broader effort to balance convenience, compatibility, and riding performance.

=== Speed entry (hybrid) ===
There are also proprietary systems that seek to combine the convenience of step-in systems with the control levels attainable with strap-ins. An example is the Flow binding system, which is similar to a strap-in binding, except that the foot enters the binding through the back. The back flips down and allows the boot to slide in; it's then flipped up and locked into place with a clamp, eliminating the need to loosen and then re-tighten straps every time the rider frees and then re-secures their rear foot. The rider's boot is held down by an adjustable webbing that covers most of the foot. Newer Flow models have connected straps in place of the webbing found on older models; these straps are also micro adjustable. In 2004, K2 released the Cinch series, a similar rear-entry binding; riders slip their foot in as they would a Flow binding, however rather than webbing, the foot is held down by straps.

=== Highback ===
A stiff molded support behind the heel and up the calf area. The HyBak was originally designed by inventor Jeff Grell and built by Flite Snowboards. This allows the rider to apply pressure and effect a "heelside" turn. Some high backs are stiff vertically but provide some flex for twisting of the riders legs. The highback adjustments allow the rider to implement a higher degree of forward lean. These settings are usually calibrated between F1 (the lowest lean) to F5 (the highest lean). Implementing higher levels of lean are directly proportional to the riders skillset and type of terrain.

=== Plate ===
Plate bindings are used with hardboots on Alpine or racing snowboards. Extreme carvers and some Boarder Cross racers also use plate bindings. The stiff bindings and boots give much more control over the board and allow the board to be carved much more easily than with softer bindings. Alpine snowboards tend to be longer and thinner with a much stiffer flex for greater edge hold and better carving performance.

Snowboard bindings, unlike ski bindings, do not automatically release upon impact or after falling over. With skis, this mechanism is designed to protect from injuries (particularly to the knee) caused by skis torn in different directions. Automatic release is not required in snowboarding, as the rider's legs are fixed in a static position and twisting of the knee joint cannot occur to the same extent. Furthermore, it reduces the dangerous prospect of a board hurtling downhill riderless, and the rider slipping downhill on his back with no means to maintain grip on a steep slope. Nevertheless, some ski areas require the use of a "leash" that connects the snowboard to the rider's leg or boot, in case the snowboard manages to get away from its rider. This is most likely to happen when the rider removes the board at the top or the bottom of a run (or while on a chairlift, which could be dangerous).

A Noboard is a snowboard binding alternative with only peel and stick pads applied directly to any snowboard deck and no attachment.

=== Step-On ===
The newest innovation and public desire of bindings are step-ons with the purpose of ease and accessibility while maintaining performance and safety. Step-ons were originally made from the company Burton inspired from their previous design step-in bindings. These strapless bindings were launched in 2017 and came with a lot of concern. Step-on bindings have a hook on either side of the toes as well as a buckle on the heel. The step on boots have a cleat on the side of both toes as well as a heel clip on the back of the heel. This creates a three point contact connection between the boots and the bindings and locks the rider into the snowboard. To get into the bindings the rider would step their heel into the heel buckle first and then their toe into the toe hooks. Step ons have a lever on the side of the bindings that lifts up when pulled on that releases the heel buckle allowing the rider to get out with ease.

== Stomp pad ==
Stomp pads, which are placed between the bindings closer to the rear binding, allow the rider to better control the board with only one boot strapped in, such as when maneuvering onto a chair lift, riding a ski tow or performing a one-footed trick. Whereas the upper surface of the board is smooth, the stomp pad has a textured pattern which provides grip to the underside of the boot. Stomp pads can be decorative and vary in their size, shape and the kind and number of small spikes or friction points they provide.

== Stances ==
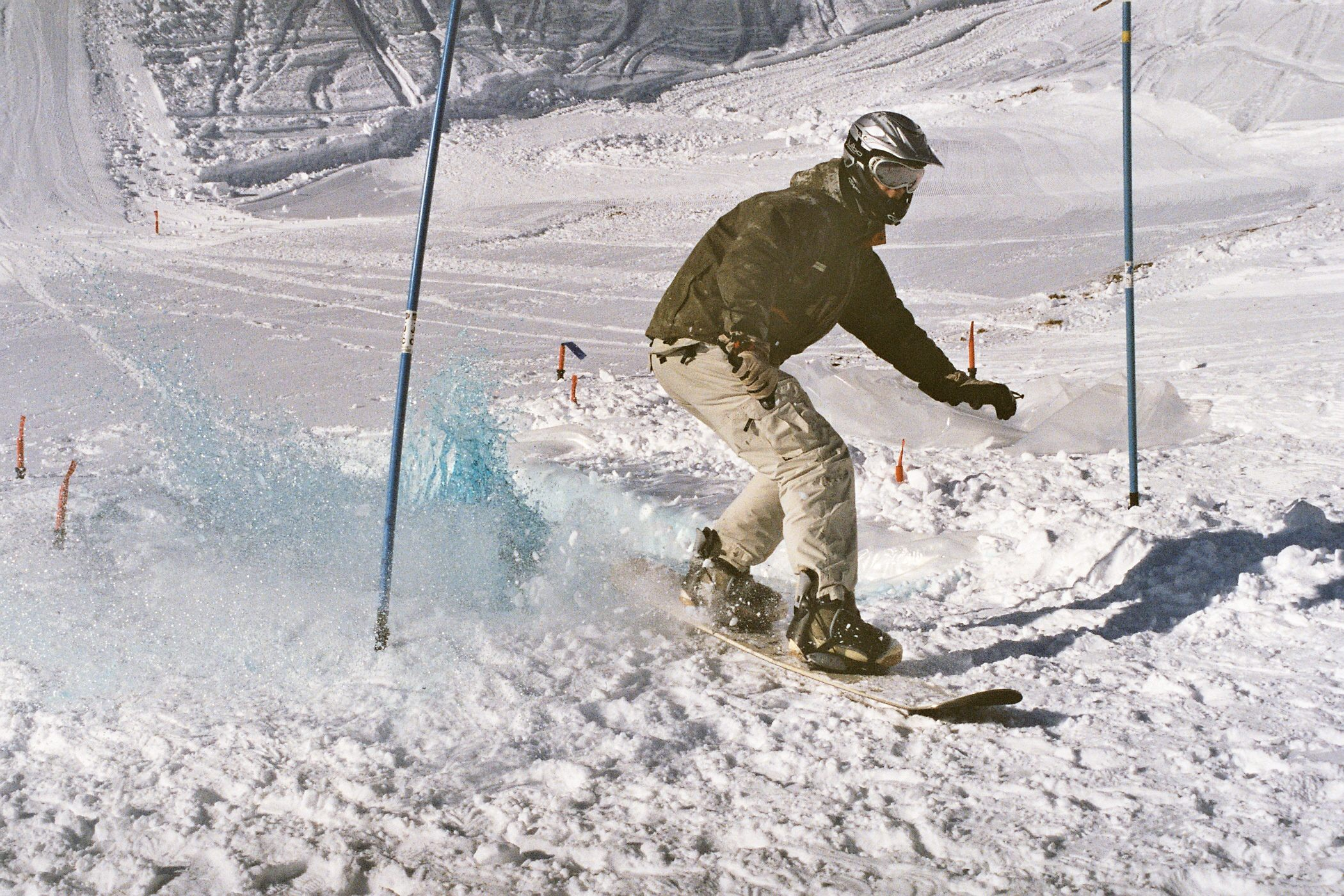
Goofy stance

There are two types of stance-direction used by snowboarders. A "regular" stance places the rider's left foot at the front of the snowboard. "Goofy", the opposite stance direction, places the rider's right foot at the front, as in skateboarding. Regular is the most common. There are different ways to determine whether a rider is "regular" or "goofy". One method used for first time riders is to observe the first step forward when walking or climbing up stairs. The first foot forward would be the foot set up at the front of the snowboard. Another method used for first time riders is to use the same foot that you kick a football with as your back foot (though this can be an inaccurate sign for some, as there are people who prefer goofy though are right handed, and therefore naturally kick a football with their right foot). This is a good method for setting up the snowboard stance for a new snowboarder. However having a surfing or skateboarding background will also help a person determine their preferred stance, although not all riders will have the same stance skateboarding and snowboarding. Another way to determine a rider's stance is to get the rider to run and slide on a tiled or wooden floor, wearing only socks, and observe which foot the person puts forward during the slide. This simulates the motion of riding a snowboard and exposes that persons natural tendency to put a particular foot forward. Another method is to stand behind the first-timer and give them a shove, enough for them to put one foot forward to stop themselves from falling. Other good ways of determining which way you ride are rushing a door (leading shoulder equals leading foot) or going into a defensive boxing stance (see which foot goes forward).

Most experienced riders are able to ride in the opposite direction to their usual stance (i.e. a "regular" rider would lead with their right foot instead of their left foot). This is called riding "fakie" or "switch".

== Stance width ==
Stance width helps determine the rider's balance on the board. The size of the rider is an important factor as well as the style of their riding when determining a proper stance width. A common measurement used for new riders is to position the bindings so that the feet are placed a little wider than shoulder width apart. Another, less orthodox form of measurement may be taken by putting your feet together and place your hands, palm down, on the ground in a straight line with your body by squatting down. This generally gives a good natural measurement for how wide of a base your body uses to properly balance itself when knees are bent. However, personal preference and comfort are important and most experienced riders will adjust the stance width to personal preference. Skateboarders should find that their snowboarding and skateboarding stance widths are relatively similar.

A wider stance, common for freestyle riders, gives more stability when landing a jump or jibbing a rail. Control in a wider stance is reduced when turning on the piste. Conversely a narrow stance will give the rider more control when turning on the piste but less stability when freestyling. A narrow stance is more common for riders looking for quicker turn edge-hold (i.e. small radius turns). The narrow stance will give the rider a concentrated stability between the bindings allowing the board to dig into the snow quicker than a wider stance so the rider is less prone to wash out.

== Binding angle ==
Binding angle is defined by the degrees off of perpendicular from the length of the snowboard. A binding angle of 0° is when the foot is perpendicular to the length of the snowboard. Positive angles are pointed towards the front of the board, whereas negative angles are pointed towards the back of the board. The question of how much the bindings are angled depends on the rider's purpose and preference. Different binding angles can be used for different types of snowboarding. Someone who participates in freestyle competition would have a much different "stance" than someone who explores backcountry and powder. The recent advancement and boom of snowboard culture and technology has made binding angle adjustments relatively easy. Binding companies design their bindings with similar baseplates that can easily mount onto any type of snowboard regardless of the brand. With the exception of Burton, and their newly released "channel system", adjusting bindings is something that remains constant among all snowboarders. Done with a small screw-driver or a snowboard tool, the base plates on bindings can be easily rotated to whatever preferred stance. One must un-screw the baseplate, pick their degree angles, and then re-screw the baseplates. Bindings should also regularly be checked to ensure that the screws don't come undone from the movements of snowboarding.

- Forward stance: Suitable for most purposes, both feet are angled forward. Frequently the leading foot is angled roughly 15° to 21° and the trailing foot at 0° to 10°. A downside is that a rider's balance is notably different when riding in reverse compared to their forward stance. This can be compensated for by learning how to ride backwards with this stance, also known as riding "switch", or by choosing another stance such as Duck, or Flat stance. As riders become more experienced, they can experiment with different "stances" to feel what is best for them.
- Alpine stance: Used primarily for alpine racing, the leading foot may be from 50° up to around 70° and the trailing foot generally identical or up to 10˚ less. This gives the rider balance on their board, while angling their feet for best directional control at high speeds.
- Duck stance: Useful for tricks by removing the forward bias altogether, the feet are angled outwards in opposite directions, such as 15° for the front foot and -6° for the back foot. This stance is becoming increasingly popular, and is the most resilient of the three. The feet do not actually have to be angled equally outwards to be considered duck stance. The back foot simply has to be angled less than zero degrees. These angles give the rider a dominant front foot angle at all times which makes it easier for a rider to change the board direction mid-run. This change in board direction mid-run is called riding "Switch" or "Fakie". Duck stance is also very popular for park riders because it gives them the versatility to move their board in all directions. It is easier to spin, balance on rails and boxes, and land "switch" when one's feet are both angled outward. The degree of the angle depends on the individual.
- Flat stance: Also popular with riders who wish to have a consistent stance riding forward or backward, a flat stance is simply one in which both feet are at a zero angle, or perpendicular to the length of the board. This may result in "toe drag" on narrower boards or if the rider has larger feet, in which the rider's toes overhang the edge of the board and may contact the snow during sharp turns on the toe side of the board. The "Flat" Stance is no longer popular and is not recommended by the AASI (American Association of Snowboard Instructors). Riders who use the flat stance will commonly experience pain in their ankles and calves when turning toe-side and heel-side.

== Skiboarding ==
Skiboarding is a type of freestyle skiing using short, double-tipped skis, most commonly using regular ski boots, non-release skiboard bindings, and no ski poles. By using risers which serve as adapters, standard ski or snowboard bindings are sometimes used.

The term skiboarding generally refers to the use of a wider version of a short double tipped ski, while snowblades or skiblades are usually the width of an average ski or thinner.

Skiboarding is a recreational sport with no governing body or competition.

The first mass-produced skiboard was pioneered and invented by Michael Canon, Stephanie Simon and Tayt Tindal. The company was called Klimax Skiboards. After coining the name of the sport "Skiboarding" Michael Canon and Micah Fisher spun off to create Canon Skiboards which quickly became the 800 lb gorilla in the sport. More American manufacturers followed Canon such as Line, Salomon and Groove, and the sport grew in popularity. From 1997 to 2000, skiboarding was part of the winter X Games in the slopestyle and big air. As the sport evolved, skiboards became longer and evolved into twin tip skiing, and many skiboarding companies switched to freestyle skiing on twin-tip skis.

Today skiboards are still available from brands such as Rvl8, Summit, Spruce Mountain, Bluemoris, K2, and Head.

Skiboards and snowblades/skiblades are from about 75 to 135 cm (2 to 4 feet) in length, with a parabolic shape like a snowboard, and a solid wood or foam core. Length and width are a function of rider weight, skiing style, and conditions.

== See also ==
- Dual Edge Snowboard
- Freeboard (skateboard)
- Monoski
- Noboard
- Ski
- Skateboard
- Skwal
- Snowboarding
- Snurfer
- Splitboard
- SSX
- Surfboard
- Teleboard
