= Snowboarding =

Snow sport involving a single board

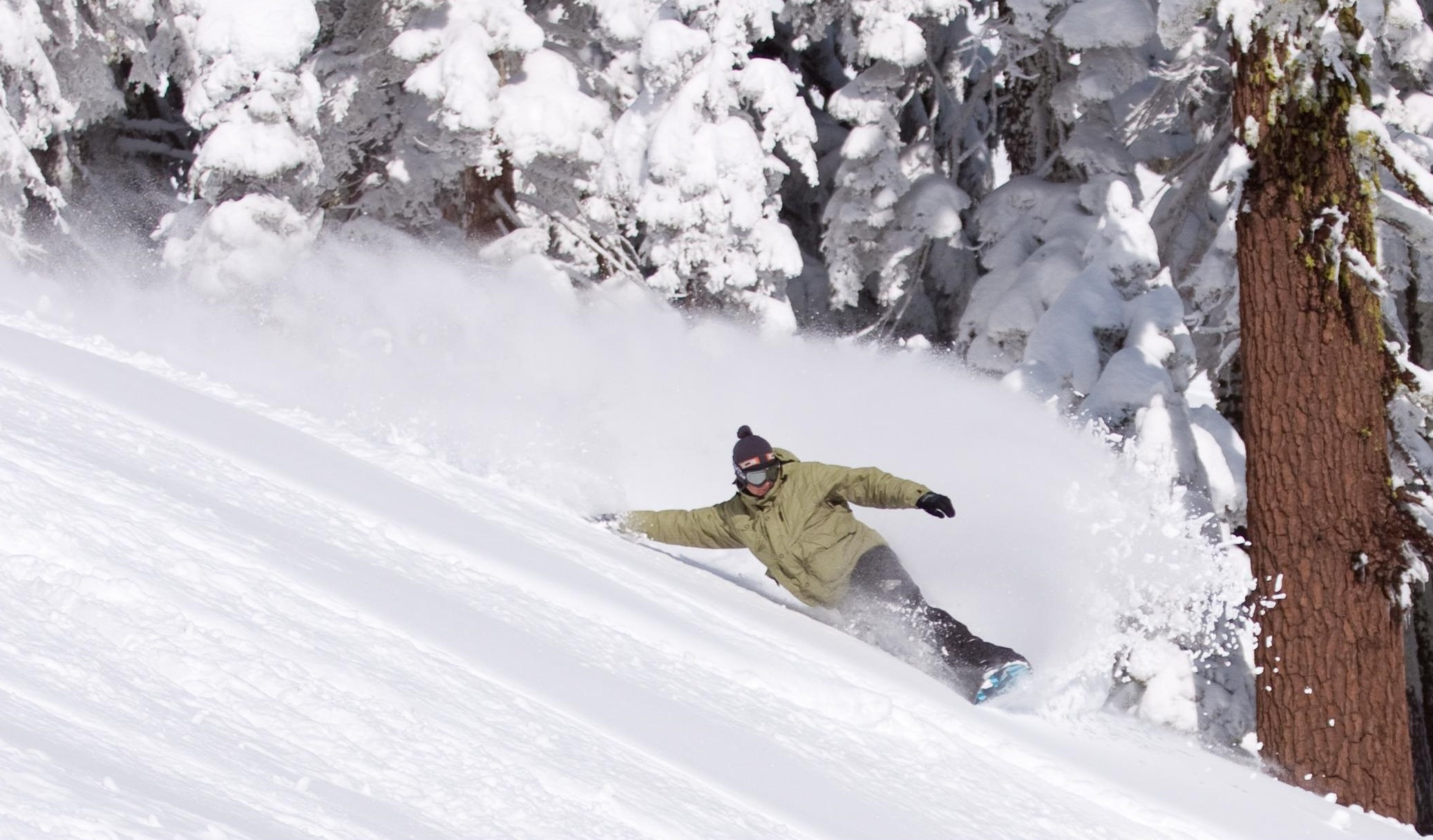
- A snowboarder making a turn in fresh snow
- Highest governing body: International Ski and Snowboard Federation (FIS)
- First played: 1979, Muskegon, Michigan, US

Characteristics
- Type: Outdoor
- Equipment: Snowboard, bindings, boots, Helmet, Wrist Guards, Goggles, Binding Rotating Device

Presence
- Olympic: Since 1998
- Paralympic: part of the Alpine skiing programme in 2014; Officially added in 2018. Part of 2022.

Pictogram for Snowboarding at the Winter Olympics

Snowboarding is a recreational and competitive sport that involves descending a snow-covered surface while standing on a snowboard with bindings securing the rider's feet to the board.

Snowboarding was first developed in 1965 in the United States. Over time, several riding styles have developed, and the sport has featured in the Winter Olympic Games since 1998 and Winter Paralympic Games since 2018.

Snowboarding became popular around the world in the late 20th century. The sport features both recreational and competitive participation.

Snowboarding has influenced and developed its own distinct culture. It has become a globally practiced activity with snowboarders using specialized equipment and techniques to navigate diverse terrain and conditions.

== History ==
Snowboarding in Valfréjus, France

Snowboarder riding off a cornice

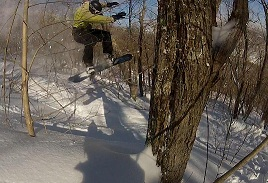
Freeride snowboarding, in areas off the main trails

=== Initial origins ===
The first snowboards were developed in 1965 when Sherm Poppen, an engineer in Muskegon, Michigan, invented a toy for his daughters by fastening two skis together and attaching a rope to one end so he would have some control as they stood on the board and glided downhill. Dubbed the "snurfer" (combining snow and surfer) by his wife Nancy, the toy proved so popular among his daughters' friends that Poppen licensed the idea to a manufacturer, Brunswick Corporation, that sold about a million snurfers over the next decade. And, in 1966 alone, over half a million snurfers were sold.

Modern snowboarding was pioneered by Tom Sims and Jake Burton Carpenter. In February 1968, Poppen organized the first snurfing competition at a Michigan ski resort that attracted enthusiasts from all over the country. One of those early pioneers was Tom Sims, a devotee of skateboarding (a sport born in the 1950s when kids attached roller skate wheels to small boards that they steered by shifting their weight). In the 1960s, as an eighth grader in Haddonfield, New Jersey, Sims crafted a snowboard in his school shop class by gluing carpet to the top of a piece of wood and attaching aluminum sheeting to the bottom. He produced commercial snowboards in the mid-70s including the Skiboard (also known as the Lonnie Toft flying banana) a molded polyethylene bottom with a Lonnie Toft signature skateboard deck attached to the top. Others experimented with board-on-snow configurations at this time, including Welsh skateboard enthusiasts Jon Roberts and Pete Matthews developed their own snowboards to use at their local dry ski slope.

Also during this same period, in 1977, Jake Burton Carpenter, a Vermont native who had enjoyed snurfing since the age of 14, impressed the crowd at a Michigan snurfing competition with bindings he had designed to secure his feet to the board. That same year, he founded Burton Snowboards in Londonderry, Vermont. The "snowboards" were made of wooden planks that were flexible and had water ski foot traps. Very few people picked up snowboarding because the price of the board was considered too high at $38 and were not allowed on many ski hills, but eventually Burton would become the biggest snowboarding company in the business. Burton's created the early designs for boards with bindings. Later on, various versions of bindings became a common feature in most snowboards.

=== Development ===
As snowboarding became more popular in the 1970s and 1980s, pioneers such as Dimitrije Milovich (founder of Winterstick out of Salt Lake City, Utah), Jake Burton Carpenter (founder of Burton Snowboards from Londonderry, Vermont), Tom Sims (founder of Sims Snowboards), David Kemper (founder of Kemper Snowboards) and Mike Olson (founder of Gnu Snowboards) came up with new designs for boards and mechanisms that slowly developed into the snowboards and other related equipment. From these developments, modern snowboarding equipment usually consists of a snowboard with specialized bindings and boots.

In the early 1980s, Aleksey Ostatnigrosh and Alexei Melnikov, two Snurfers from the Soviet Union, patented design changes to the Snurfer to allow jumping by attaching a bungee cord, a single footed binding to the Snurfer tail, and a two-foot binding design for improved control.

=== Public perception ===
Initially, ski areas adopted the sport at a much slower pace than the winter sports public. Indeed, for many years, there was animosity between skiers and snowboarders, which led to an ongoing feud between them. Early snowboards were banned from the slopes by park officials. For several years snowboarders would have to take a small skills assessment prior to being allowed to ride the chairlifts. It was thought that an unskilled snowboarder would wipe the snow off the mountain. In 1985, only seven percent of U.S. ski areas allowed snowboarding, with a similar proportion in Europe. As equipment and skills improved, gradually snowboarding became more accepted. In 1990, most major ski areas had separate slopes for snowboarders. Now, approximately 97% of all ski areas in North America and Europe allow snowboarding, and more than half have jumps, rails and half pipes.

In 2008, snowboarding had over 5 million participants, most aged between 18 and 24, with women comprising 25% of participants.

There were 8.2 million snowboarders in the US and Canada for the 2009–2010 season. There was a 10% increase over the previous season, accounting for more than 30% of all snow sports participants.

=== Competitive history ===
The first competitions to offer prize money were the National Snurfing Championship, held at Muskegon State Park in Muskegon, Michigan. In 1979, Jake Burton Carpenter came from Vermont to compete with a snowboard of his own design. There were protests about Jake entering with a non-snurfer board. Paul Graves, and others, advocated that Jake be allowed to race. A "modified" "Open" division was created and won by Jake as the sole entrant. That race was considered the first competition for snowboarding and is the start of what became competitive snowboarding. Ken Kampenga, John Asmussen and Jim Trim placed first, second and third respectively in the Standard competition with best two combined times of 24.71, 25.02 and 25.41; and Jake Carpenter won prize money as the sole entrant in the "open" division with a time of 26.35. In 1980 the event moved to Pando Winter Sports Park near Grand Rapids, Michigan, because of a lack of snow that year at the original venue.

In April 1981, the "King of the Mountain" Snowboard competition was held at Ski Cooper in Colorado. Tom Sims along with an assortment of other snowboarders of the time were present. One entrant showed up on a homemade snowboard with a formica bottom that turned out to not slide so well on the snow.

In 1982, the first USA National Snowboard race was held near Woodstock, Vermont, at Suicide Six. The race, organized by Graves, was won by Burton's first team rider Doug Bouton.

In 1983, the first World Championship halfpipe competition was held at Soda Springs, California. Tom Sims, founder of Sims Snowboards, organized the event with the help of Mike Chantry, a snowboard instructor at Soda Springs.

In 1985, the first World Cup was held in Zürs, Austria, further cementing snowboarding's recognition as an official international competitive sport.

In 1990, the International Snowboard Federation (ISF) was founded to provide universal contest regulations. In addition, the United States of America Snowboard Association (USASA) provides instructing guidelines and runs snowboard competitions in the U.S. today, high-profile snowboarding events like the Winter X Games, Air & Style, US Open, Olympic Games and other events are broadcast worldwide. Many alpine resorts have terrain parks.

At the 1998 Winter Olympic Games in Nagano, Japan, Snowboarding became an official Olympic event. France's Karine Ruby was the first to win an Olympic gold medal for Woman's Snowboarding, while Canadian Ross Rebagliati was the first for Men's Snowboarding.

On 2 May 2012, the International Paralympic Committee announced that adaptive snowboarding (dubbed "para-snowboarding") would debut as a men's and women's medal event in the 2014 Paralympic Winter Games taking place in Sochi, Russia.

== Styles ==
Since snowboarding's inception as an established winter sport, it has developed various styles, each with its own specialized equipment and technique. The most common styles today are: freeride, freestyle, and freecarve/race. These styles are used for both recreational and professional snowboarding. While each style is unique, there is overlap between them.

=== Jibbing ===
"Jibbing" is the term for technical riding on non-standard surfaces. The word "jib" is both a noun and a verb, depending on the usage of the word. As a noun: a jib includes metal rails, boxes, benches, concrete ledges, walls, vehicles, rocks and logs. As a verb: to jib is referring to the action of jumping, sliding, or riding on top of objects other than snow. It is directly influenced by grinding a skateboard. Jibbing is a freestyle snowboarding technique of riding. Typically jibbing occurs in a snowboard resort park but can also be done in urban environments.

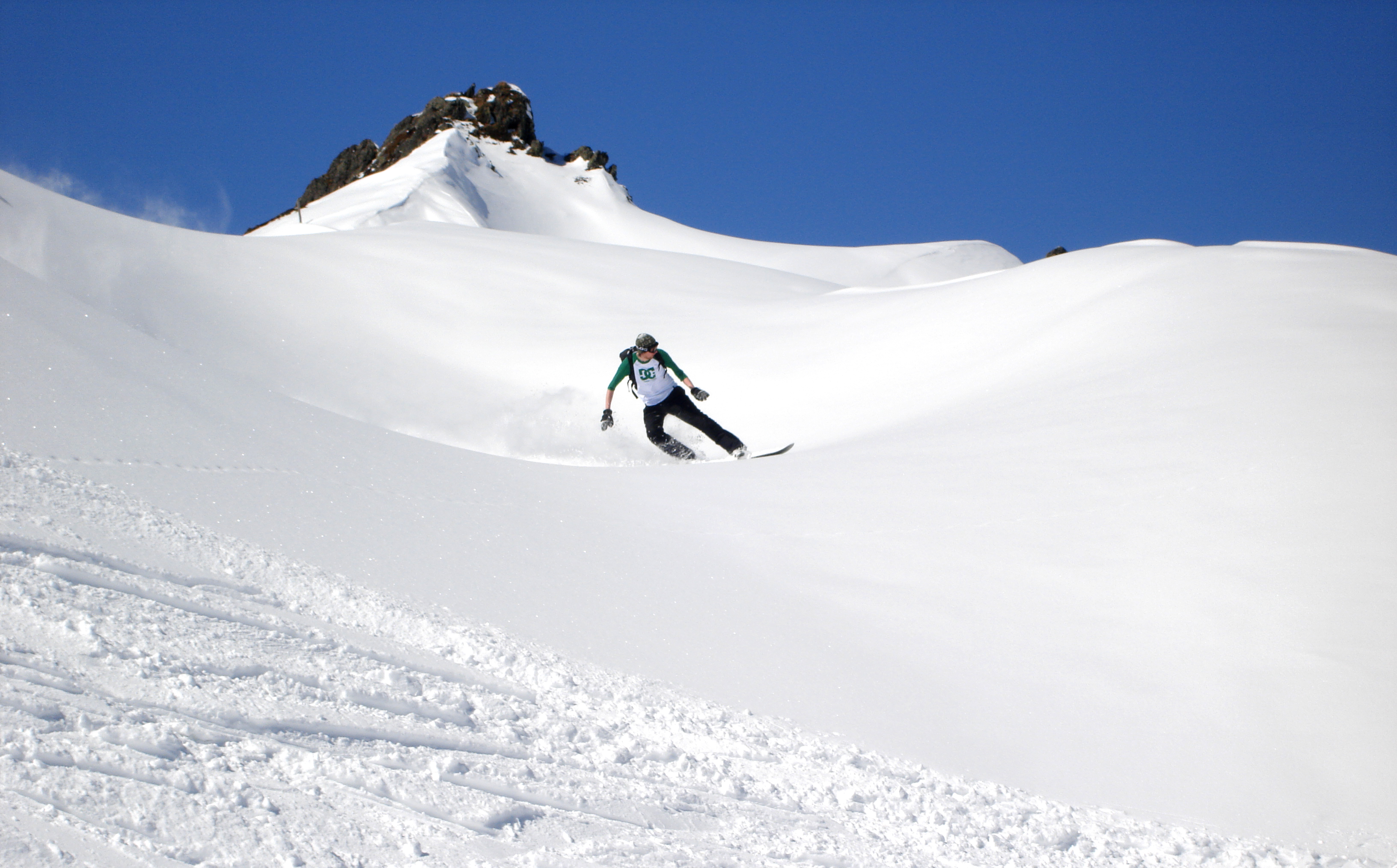
Freeriding snowboarding

=== Freeriding ===
Freeriding is a style without a set of governing rules or set course, typically on natural, un-groomed terrain. The basic allows for various snowboarding styles in a fluid motion and spontaneity through naturally rugged terrain. It can be like freestyle with the exception that no man-made features are utilized. See also Backcountry snowboarding.

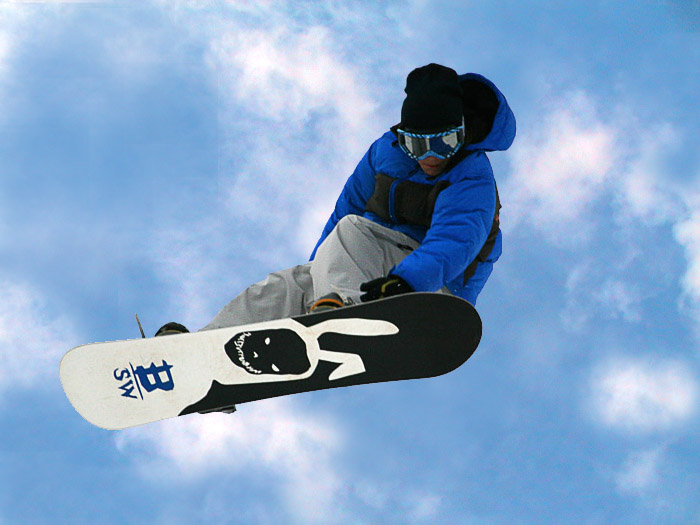
Freestyle snowboarding

=== Freestyle ===
Freestyle snowboarding is any riding that includes performing tricks. In freestyle, the rider utilizes natural and man-made features such as rails, jumps, boxes, and innumerable others to perform tricks. It is a popular all-inclusive concept that distinguishes the creative aspects of snowboarding, in contrast to a style like alpine snowboarding.

=== Alpine snowboarding ===
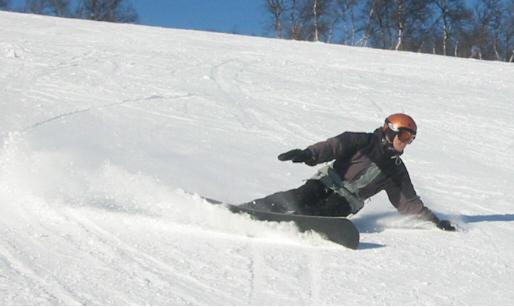
An Alpine snowboarder executes a heel-side carved turn, the typical style in alpine snowboarding.

Video of a snowboarder practicing carving on a hard slope, equipped with a boardercross board and hard boots.

Alpine snowboarding is a discipline within the sport of snowboarding. It is practiced on groomed pistes. It has been an Olympic event since 1998.

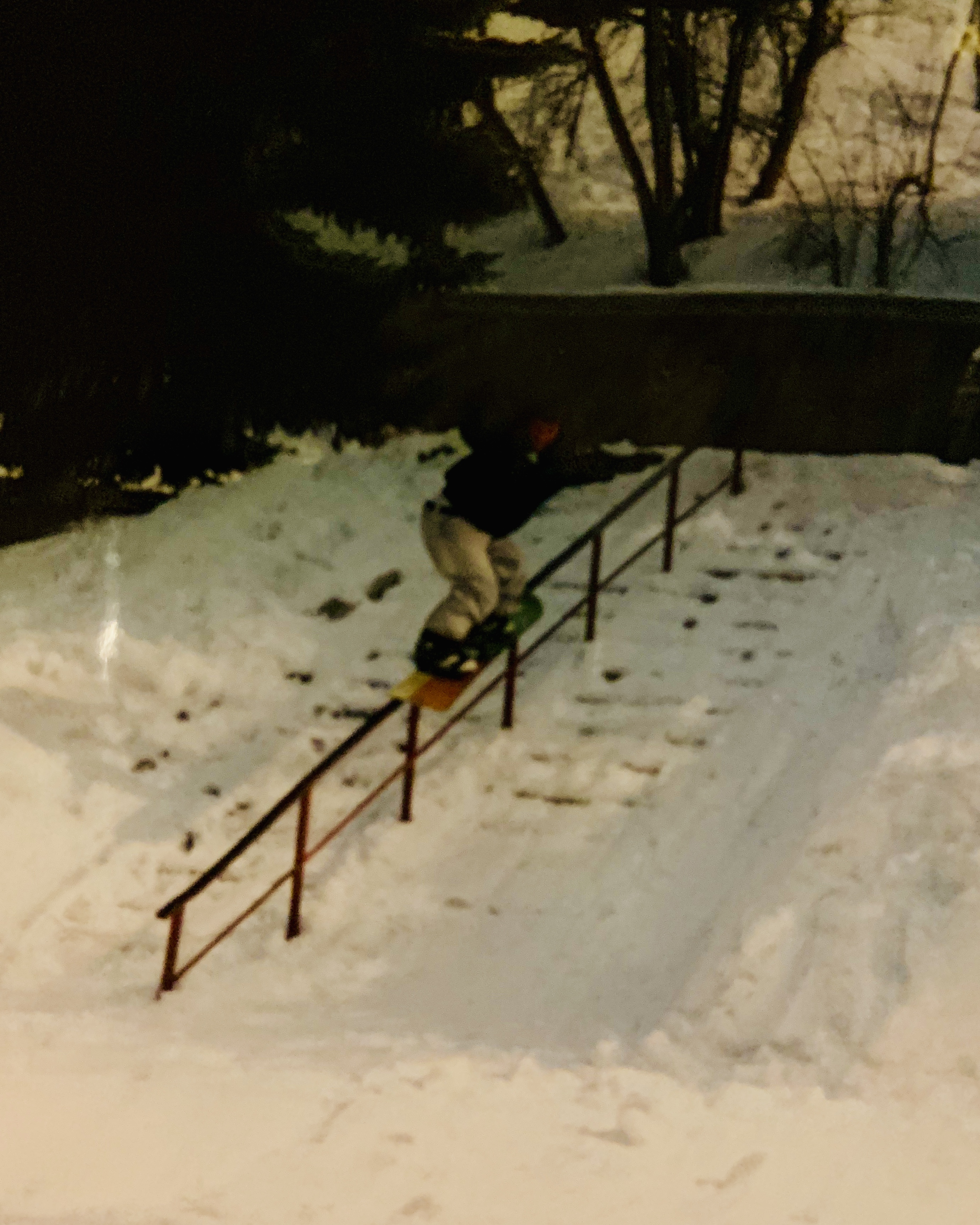
Freestyle snowboarder Matty Shaffer performs a 50-50 on a handrail while filming for a movie in Utah.

Sometimes called freecarving or hardbooting (due to the equipment used), this discipline usually takes place on hard packed snow or groomed runs (although it can be practiced in any and all conditions) and focuses on carving linked turns, much like surfing or longboarding. Little or no jumping takes place in this discipline. Alpine Snowboarding consists of a small portion of the general snowboard population, that has a well connected social community and its own specific board manufacturers, most situated in Europe. Alpine Snowboard equipment includes a ski-like hardshell boot and plate binding system with a true directional snowboard that is stiffer and narrower to manage linking turns with greater forces and speed. Shaped skis can thank these "freecarve" snowboards for the cutting-edge technology leading to their creation. A skilled alpine snowboarder can link numerous turns into a run placing their body very close to the ground each turn, similar to a motocross turn or waterski carve. Depending on factors including stiffness, turning radius and personality this can be done slowly or fast. Carvers make perfect half-circles out of each turn, changing edges when the snowboard is perpendicular to the fall line and starting every turn on the downhill edge. Carving on a snowboard is like riding a roller coaster, because the board will lock into a turn radius and provide what feels like multiple Gs of acceleration.

Alpine snowboarding shares more visual similarities with skiing equipment than it does with snowboarding equipment. Compared to freestyle snowboarding gear:

- Boards are narrower, longer, and stiffer to improve carving performance
- Boots are made from a hard plastic shell, making it flex differently from a regular snowboard boot and is designed differently to ski boots although they look similar.
- Bindings have a bail or step-in design and are sometimes placed on suspension plates to provide a layer of isolation between an alpine snowboarder and the board, to decrease the level of vibrations felt by the rider, creating a better overall experience when carving, and to give extra weight to the board among other uses.

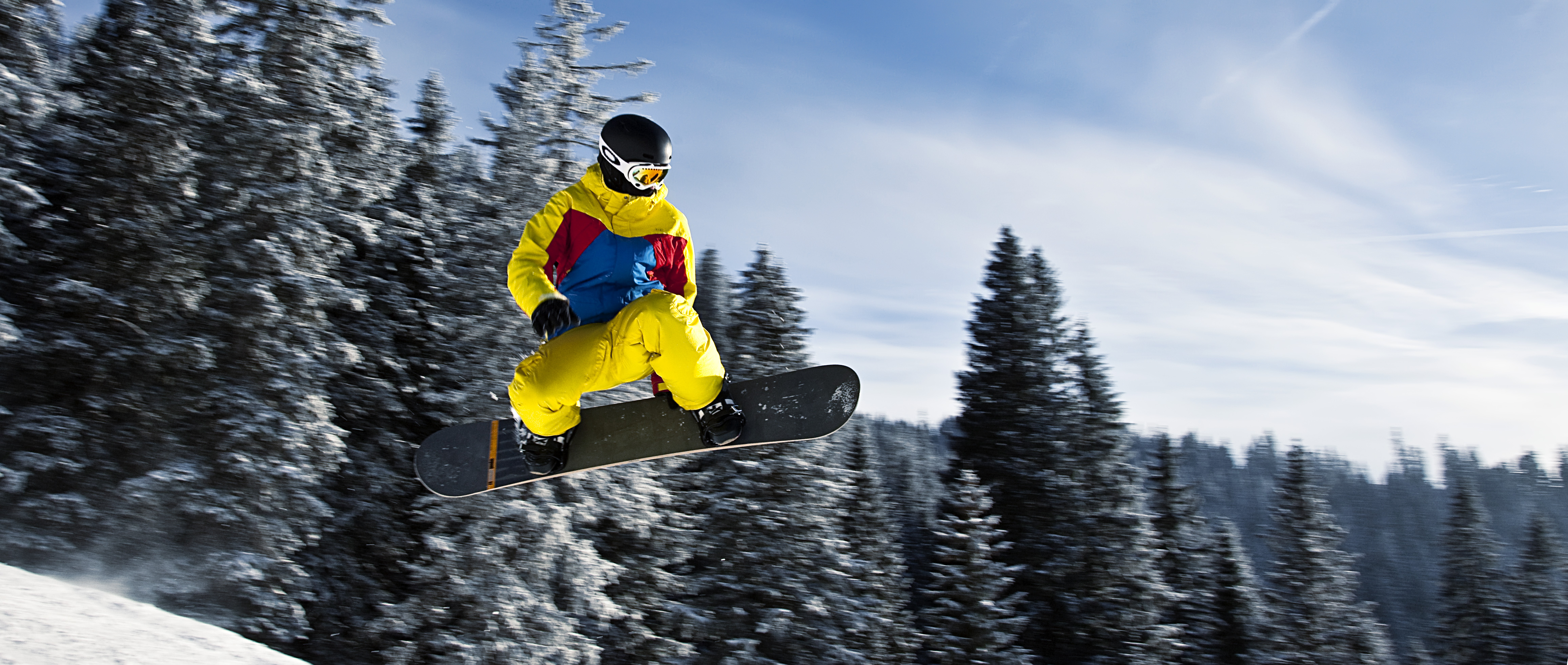
Snowboarder in Tannheim, Tyrol, Austria

=== Slopestyle ===
Competitors perform tricks while descending a course, moving around, over, across, up, or down terrain features. The course is full of obstacles including boxes, rails, jumps, jibs, or anything else the board or rider can slide across. Slopestyle is a judged event and winning a Slopestyle contest usually comes from successfully executing the most difficult line in the terrain park while having a smooth flowing line of difficult, mistake-free tricks performed on the obstacles. However, overall impression and style can play a factor in winning a Slopestyle contest and the rider who lands the hardest tricks will not always win over the rider who lands easier tricks on more difficult paths.

=== Big air ===
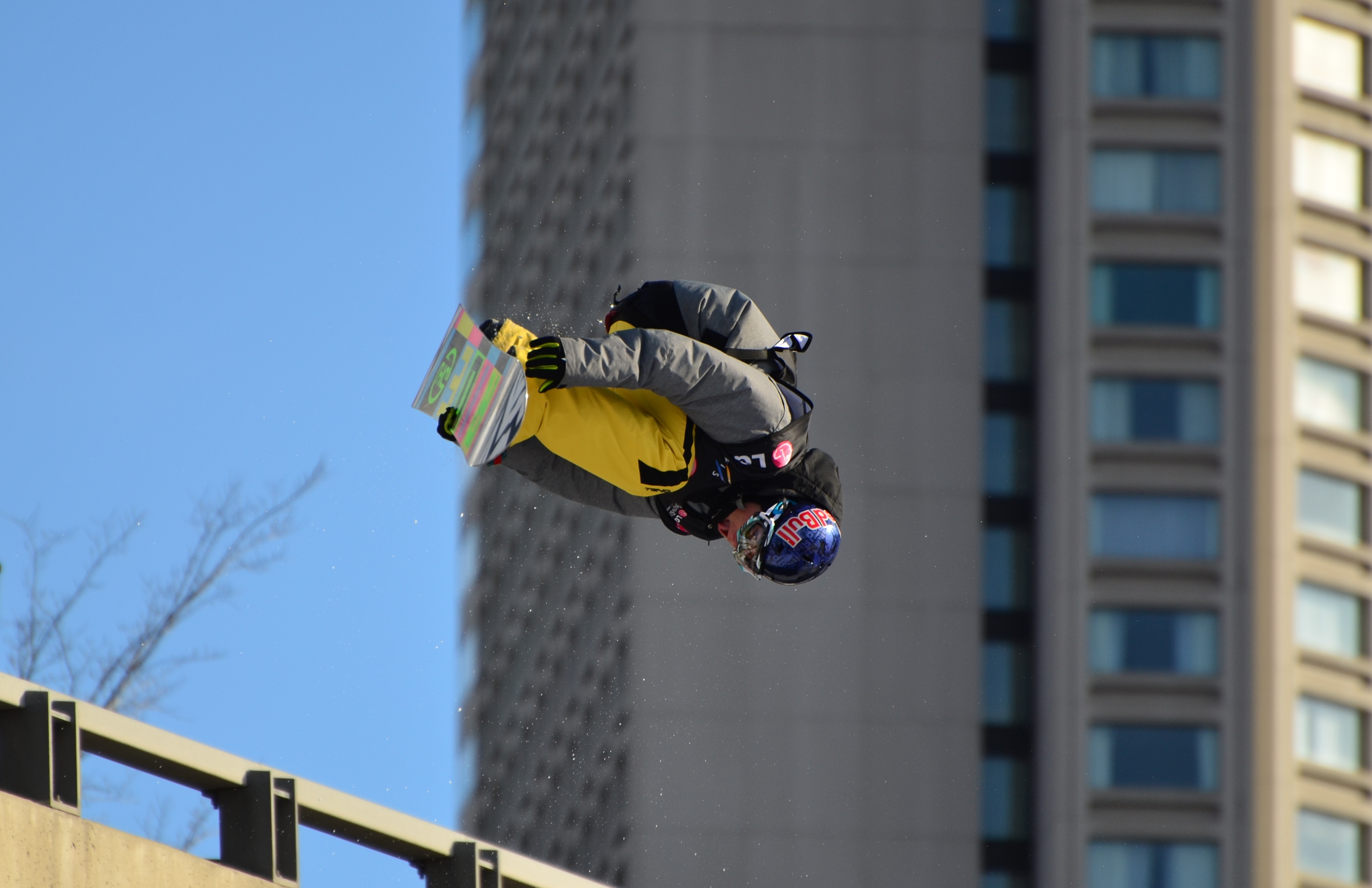
Sebastien Toutant at the downtown Québec big air competition

Big air competitions are contests where riders perform tricks after launching off a man-made jump built specifically for the event. Competitors perform tricks in the air, aiming to attain sizable height and distance, all while securing a clean landing. Many competitions also require the rider to do a complex trick. Not all competitions call for a trick to win the gold; some intermittent competitions are based solely on height and distance of the launch of the snowboarder. Some competitions also require the rider to do a specific trick to win the major prize. One of the first snowboard competitions where Travis Rice attempted and landed a "double back flip backside 180" took place at the 2006 Red Bull Gap Session.

=== Half-pipe ===
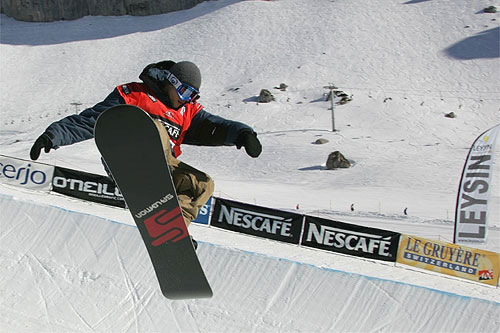
Snowboarder in the halfpipe

The half-pipe is a semi-circular ditch dug into the mountain or purpose-built ramp made up of snow, with walls between 8 and 23 feet (7.0 m). Competitors perform tricks while going from one side to the other and while in the air above the sides of the pipe.

=== Snowboard cross ===
Snowboard cross, also known as "boardercross", "boarder X", or "snowboard X", and commonly abbreviated as "SBX", or just "BX", is a snowboarding discipline consisting of several (typically 4 to 6) riders racing head-to-head down a course with jumps, berms and other obstacles constructed out of snow. Snowboard cross began in the 1980s, earning its place as an official Winter Olympic event in the 2006 Turin games. Unlike other snowboard racing disciplines such as parallel giant slalom, competitors race on a single course together.

=== Snowboard racing ===
In snowboard racing, riders must complete a downhill course constructed of a series of turning color indicators (gates) placed in the snow at prescribed distances apart. A gate consists of a tall pole and a short pole, connected by a triangular panel. The racer must pass around the short side of the gate, passing the long side of the gate doesn't count. There are 3 main formats used in snowboard racing including single person, parallel courses or multiple people on the course at the same time (SBX).

== Competitions ==
Snowboarding contests are held throughout the world and range from grassroots competitions to professional events contested worldwide.

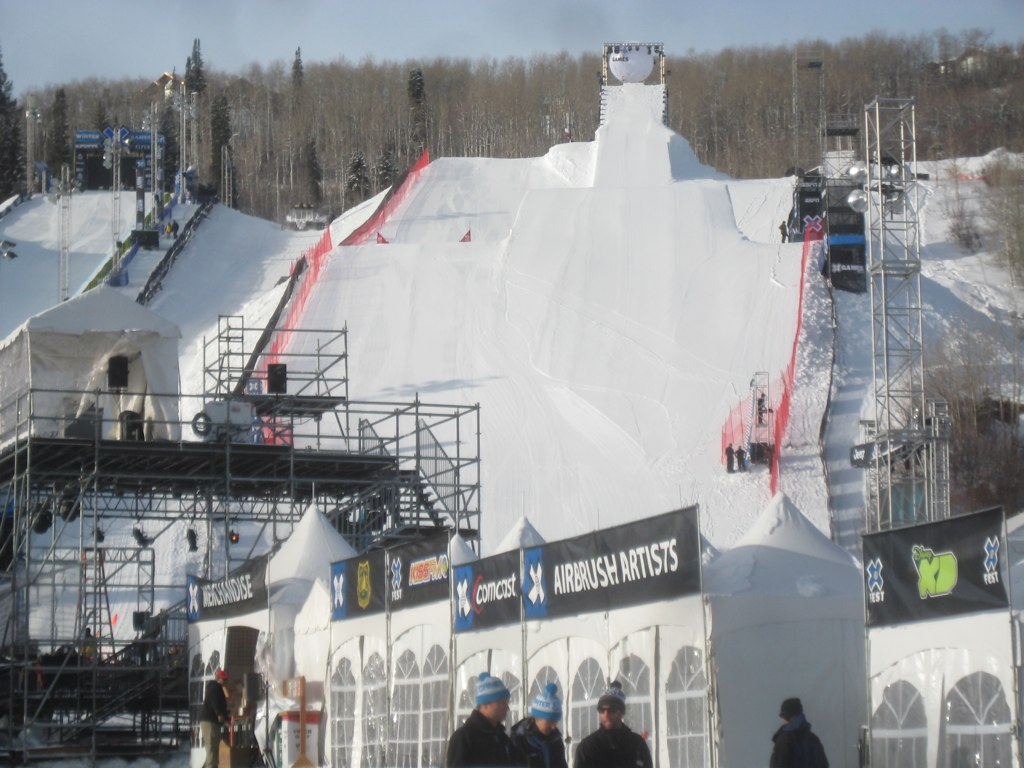
2016 Winter X Games in Aspen, Colorado

Some of the larger snowboarding contests include: the European Air & Style, the Japanese X-Trail Jam, Burton Global Open Series, Shakedown, FIS World Championships, the annual FIS World Cup, the Winter X Games, Freeride World Tour and the Winter Dew Tour.

Snowboarding has been a Winter Olympic sport since 1998 Winter Olympics in Japan. Since its inauguration, Olympic snowboarding has seen many additions and removals of events. During the 2018 Winter Olympics, snowboarding events contested included big air, halfpipe, parallel giant slalom, slopestyle and snowboard cross.

Snowboarder Magazine's Superpark event was created in 1996. Over 150 of the World's top pros are invited to advance freestyle snowboarding on the most progressive terrain parks.

Part of the snowboarding approach is to ensure maximum fun, friendship and event quality. Reflecting this perspective of snowboarding, there are "Anti Contests" which are an important part of its identity. These include the Holy Oly Revival at The Summit at Snoqualmie, The Nate Chute Hawaiian Classic at Whitefish, the original anti-contest, the World Quarterpipe Championships and the Grenade Games.

The United States of America Snowboarding and Freeski Association (USASA), the first governing body for grassroots snowboarding, runs 30 regional series and national championships in the US.

== Subculture ==
Snowboarding subculture originated as the sport was rejected in ski resorts. Both the skiing and snowboarding cultures contrasted with each other in language, behavior, and dress. Snowboarding subculture was frequently associated with a rebellious or outsider identity and incorporated elements of both urban and suburban cultures.

In recent decades, snowboarding has expanded into a diverse international participant base. Skiers and snowboarders have increasingly shared slopes and facilities. As of 2026, three resorts do not allow snowboarding in North America: Alta, Deer Valley, and Mad River Glen.

== Common injuries ==
The most common type of injury for snowboarders is injury to the upper body. Some injuries that are seen are "wrist injuries, shoulder soft tissue injuries, ankle injuries, concussions, and clavicle fractures". Some major injuries that occur during snowboarding are head, and spinal injuries, "the main cause of spinal fractures in snowboarders was jump landing failure and compression type fractures occur in about 80% of snowboarders with vertebral fractures because they frequently fall backwards, and this can cause axial loading and anterior compression fractures". Injuries also differ between professional and recreational snowboarding.

=== Professional ===
Among professional snowboarders, injuries to the lower half, specifically the knee joint, are more likely to occur. When injured, snowboarders are twice as likely to get a fracture as skiers. Injuries to the upper body are much less common among professional snowboarders. Most of the professionals and elite snowboarders frequently sustain injuries when trying to execute challenging tricks at high speeds and with increased levels of force to the lower limbs.

=== Recreational ===
In recreational snowboarding, wrist injuries are more likely to occur. Most injuries to snowboarders occurred more often while they were traveling at reckless speed on moderate slopes. Another way injuries happen is because they try sticking with someone that is a higher skill level, which they are not capable of handling because of the lack of skill they possess.

== Safety and precautions ==
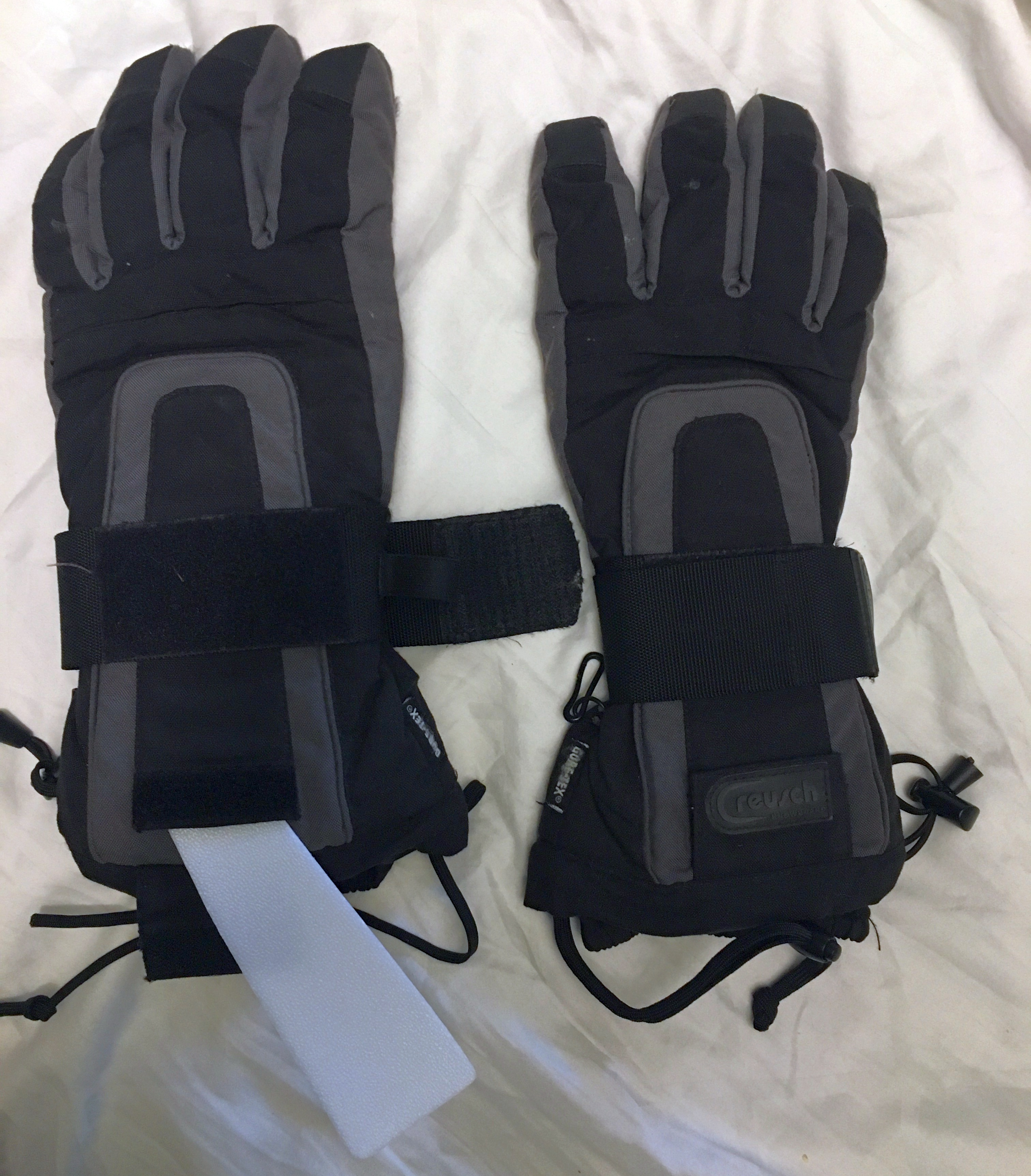
Gloves with an integrated plastic element, seen left partially pulled out, as a wrist guard. The element is pressed tightly to the wrist with a wide, all-around velcro-fastened strap, which can be seen in loose state on the left and tightened on the right glove. This stabilizes the wrist and thus avoids its damage when falling onto the hands.

Like some other winter sports, snowboarding comes with a certain level of risk.

=== Risk ===
The average snowboarder is a male in their early twenties, and there are three times as many men as there are women in the sport. Snowboarders have a 2.4 times greater risk of fractures than skiers, particularly in the upper extremities. Conversely, snowboarders have a lower risk of knee injuries than skiers. The injury rate for snowboarding is about four to six per thousand persons per day, which is around double the injury rate for alpine skiing. Injuries are more likely amongst beginners, especially those who do not take lessons with professional instructors. A quarter of all injuries occur to first-time riders and half of all injuries occur to those with less than a year of experience. Experienced riders are less likely to suffer injury, but the injuries that do occur tend to be more severe.

Two-thirds of injuries occur to the upper body and one-third to the lower body. This contrasts with alpine skiing, where two-thirds of injuries are to the lower body. The most common types of injuries are sprains, which account for around 40% of injuries. The most common point of injury is the wrists – 40% of all snowboard injuries are to the wrists and 24% of all snowboard injuries are wrist fractures. There are around 100,000 wrist fractures worldwide among snowboarders each year.

=== Protective equipment ===
The risk of head injury is two to six times greater for snowboarders than for skiers and injuries follow the pattern of being rarer, but more severe, with experienced riders. Head injuries can occur both because of a collision and when failing to carry out a heel-side turn. The latter can result in the rider landing on their back and slamming the back of their head onto the ground, resulting in an occipital head injury. For this reason, helmets are widely recommended. Protective eyewear is also recommended as eye injury can be caused by impact and snow blindness can be a result of exposure to strong ultra-violet light in snow-covered areas. The wearing of ultra-violet-absorbing goggles is recommended even on hazy or cloudy days as ultra-violet light can penetrate clouds.

Snowboarding boots should be well-fitted, with toes snug in the end of the boot when standing upright and slightly away from the end when in the snowboarding position. Padding or "armor" is recommended on other body parts such as hips, knees, spine, and shoulders. To further help avoid injury to body parts, especially knees, it is recommended to use the right technique. To acquire the right technique, one should be taught by a qualified instructor. Also, when snowboarding alone, precaution should be taken to avoid tree wells, a particularly dangerous area of loose snow that may form at the base of trees.

The use of wrist guards, either separate or built into gloves, is very strongly recommended. They are often compulsory in beginner's classes and their use reduces the likelihood of wrist injury by half. In addition it is important for snow boarders to learn how to fall without stopping the fall with their hand by trying to "push" the slope away, as landing a wrist which is bent at a 90-degree angle increase the chance of it breaking. Rather, landing with the arms stretched out (like a wing) and slapping the slope with the entire arm is an effective way to break a fall. This is the method used by practitioners of judo and other martial arts to break a fall when they are thrown against the floor by a training partner.

=== Bindings ===
Unlike ski bindings, snowboard bindings are not designed to release automatically in a fall. The mechanical support provided by the feet being locked to the board has the effect of reducing the likelihood of knee injury – 15% of snowboard injuries are to the knee, compared with 45% of all skiing injuries. Such injuries are typically to the knee ligaments, bone fractures are rare. Fractures to the lower leg are also rare but 20% of injuries are to the foot and ankle. Fractures of the talus bone are rare in other sports but account for 2% of snowboard injuries – a lateral process talus fracture is sometimes called "snowboarder's ankle" by medical staff. This injury results in persistent lateral pain in the affected ankle yet is difficult to spot in a plain X-ray image. It may be misdiagnosed as just a sprain, with possibly serious consequences as not treating the fracture can result in serious long-term damage to the ankle. The use of portable ultrasound for mountainside diagnostics has been reviewed and appears to be a plausible tool for diagnosing some of the common injuries associated with the sport.

=== Maintenance ===
Four to eight percent of snowboarding injuries take place while the person is waiting in ski-lift lines or entering and exiting ski lifts. Snowboarders push themselves forward with a free foot while in the ski-lift line, leaving the other foot (usually that of the lead leg) locked on the board at a 9–27 degree angle, placing a large torque force on this leg and predisposing the person to knee injury if a fall occurs. Snowboard binding rotating devices are designed to minimize the torque force, Quick Stance being the first developed in 1995. They allow snowboarders to turn the locked foot straight into the direction of the tip of the snowboard without removing the boot from the boot binding.

=== Precautions ===
Avalanches are a clear danger when on snowy mountain slopes.

Some care is also required when waxing a board as fluorocarbon waxes emit toxic fumes when overheated. Waxing is best performed in a ventilated area with care being taken to use the wax at the correct temperature – the wax should be melted but not smoking or smoldering.

== Terminology ==
=== Stances ===
The way in which a snowboarder normally rides most on their snowboard as determined by the placement of their feet and direction of travel.

Goofy Stance
The stance of a snowboarder that normally rides with their right foot first.
Regular Stance
The stance of a snowboarder that normally rides with their left foot first.
Switch Stance
The opposite stance of what a snowboarder normally rides.

=== Parts of a snowboard ===
Binding
The portion of the board that attaches the riders' feet to the snowboard.
Heel Edge
The edge of the snowboard that the riders' heels rest on.
Toe Edge
The edge that the riders' toes rest on
Nose Edge
The forward edge of the snowboard.
Tail Edge
The trailing edge of the snowboard.

=== Rotations ===
Backside Rotation
A flat rotation in which the back of the person's body is the first to intersect with the direction of travel; after 90 degrees of rotation, the person's back will be facing the direction of travel.
Frontside Rotation
A flat rotation in which the front of the person's body is the first to intersect with the direction of travel; after 90 degrees of rotation, the person's front will be facing the direction of travel.

=== Flips ===
Back Flip
A backwards somersault over the heel edge of the board.
Front Flip
A forwards somersault (i.e. face first) over the toe edge of the board.
Tamedog
A cartwheel over the nose edge of the board.
Wildcat
A cartwheel over the tail edge of the board.

=== Off-axis rotations ===
Off-Axis rotations combine flips and rotations; the naming convention is to first describe the horizontal rotation, followed by the number of off-axis rotations, terminated by the degree of total rotation (i.e. Backside Triple-Cork 1440).

Cork
A rotation in which the snowboard leads through the air in the direction of travel.
Rodeo
A rotation in which the person's head leads through the air in the direction of travel.

== Notable people ==
- Eva Adamczyková (born 1993), Czech snowboarder
- Jamie Anderson (born 1990), American snowboarder
- Jasey-Jay Anderson (born 1975), Canadian snowboarder
- Josie Baff (born 2003), Australian snowboarder
- Nick Baumgartner (born 1981), American snowboarder
- Torah Bright (born 1986), Australian snowboarder
- Callan Chythlook-Sifsof (born 1989), American snowboarder
- Kelly Clark (born 1983), American snowboarder
- Julia Dujmovits (born 1987), Austrian snowboarder
- Rosey Fletcher (born 1975), American snowboarder
- Peter Foley (born 1965 or 1966), American former snowboarding coach; suspended for 10 years for sexual misconduct
- Anna Gasser (born 1991), Austrian snowboarder
- Red Gerard (born 2000), American snowboarder
- Alessandro Hämmerle (born 1993), Austrian snowboarder
- Ayumu Hirano (born 1998), Japanese snowboarder
- Lindsey Jacobellis (born 1985), American snowboarder
- Scotty James (born 1994), Australian snowboarder
- Benjamin Karl (born 1985), Austrian snowboarder
- Craig Kelly (born 1966), American snowboarder
- Chloe Kim (born 2000), American snowboarder
- Ester Ledecká (born 1995), Czech snowboarder and skier
- Michela Moioli (born 1995), Italian snowboarder
- Max Parrot (born 1994), Canadian snowboarder
- Iouri Podladtchikov (born 1988), Swiss-Russian snowboarder
- Travis Rice (born 1982), American snowboarder
- Maëlle Ricker (born 1978), Canadian snowboarder
- Zoi Sadowski-Synnott (born 2001), New Zealand snowboarder
- Hannah Teter (born 1987), American snowboarder
- Sébastien Toutant (born 1992), Canadian snowboarder
- Pierre Vaultier (born 1987), French snowboarder
- Ryan Wedding (born 1981), Canadian snowboarder and alleged international drug trafficker
- Seth Wescott (born 1976), American snowboarder
- Shaun White (born 1986), American snowboarder and skateboarder
- Su Yiming (born 2004), Chinese snowboarder

== See also ==
- American Association of Snowboard Instructors
- Glossary of skiing and snowboarding terms
- Lazboard
- Sandboarding
- Skiboarding
