= Sherm Poppen =

American engineer and inventor

- Born: Sherman Robert Poppen; March 25, 1930; Muskegon, Michigan, U.S.
- Died: July 31, 2019 (aged 89); Griffin, Georgia, U.S.
- Occupation(s): Engineer, inventor
- Spouse(s): Nancy Bazarnick (died. 1993) Louise Kelly

Sherman Robert Poppen (March 25, 1930 – July 31, 2019), also known as Sherm Poppen and Sherman Poppen, was an American engineer and inventor. He was known for inventing snowboarding in 1965.

== Life and career ==
Poppen was born in Muskegon, Michigan. He attended Northwestern University, earning a bachelor's degree in business. He was a supply officer in the navy.

Poppen was an industrial gases engineer.

In 1965, Poppen invented a toy for his daughters by lashing a pair of 36-inch wooden snow skis side by side. The toy was named the snurfer. It gained popularity and the rights was given to Brunswick Corporation, a manufacturing company.

Poppen died on July 31, 2019, at his home in Griffin, Georgia, at the age of 89.
