= Snurfer =

Predecessor of the snowboard

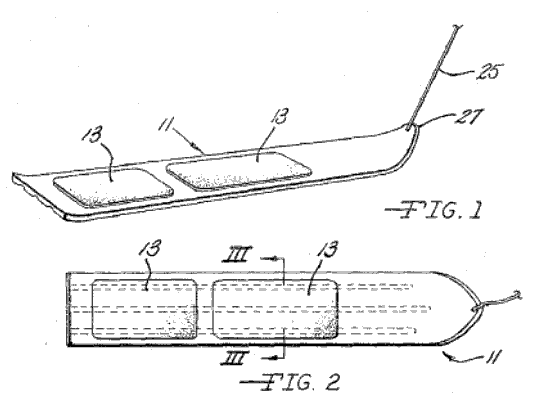
Snurfer Patent (US 3378274) diagram

The Snurfer was the predecessor of the snowboard. It was a monoski, ridden like a snowboard, but like a skateboard or surfboard, it had no binding. According to the 1966 patent by inventor Sherman Poppen, it was wider and shorter than a pair of skis, with an anti-skid foot rest. Like a sled, it had a lanyard attached to the front.

== History ==
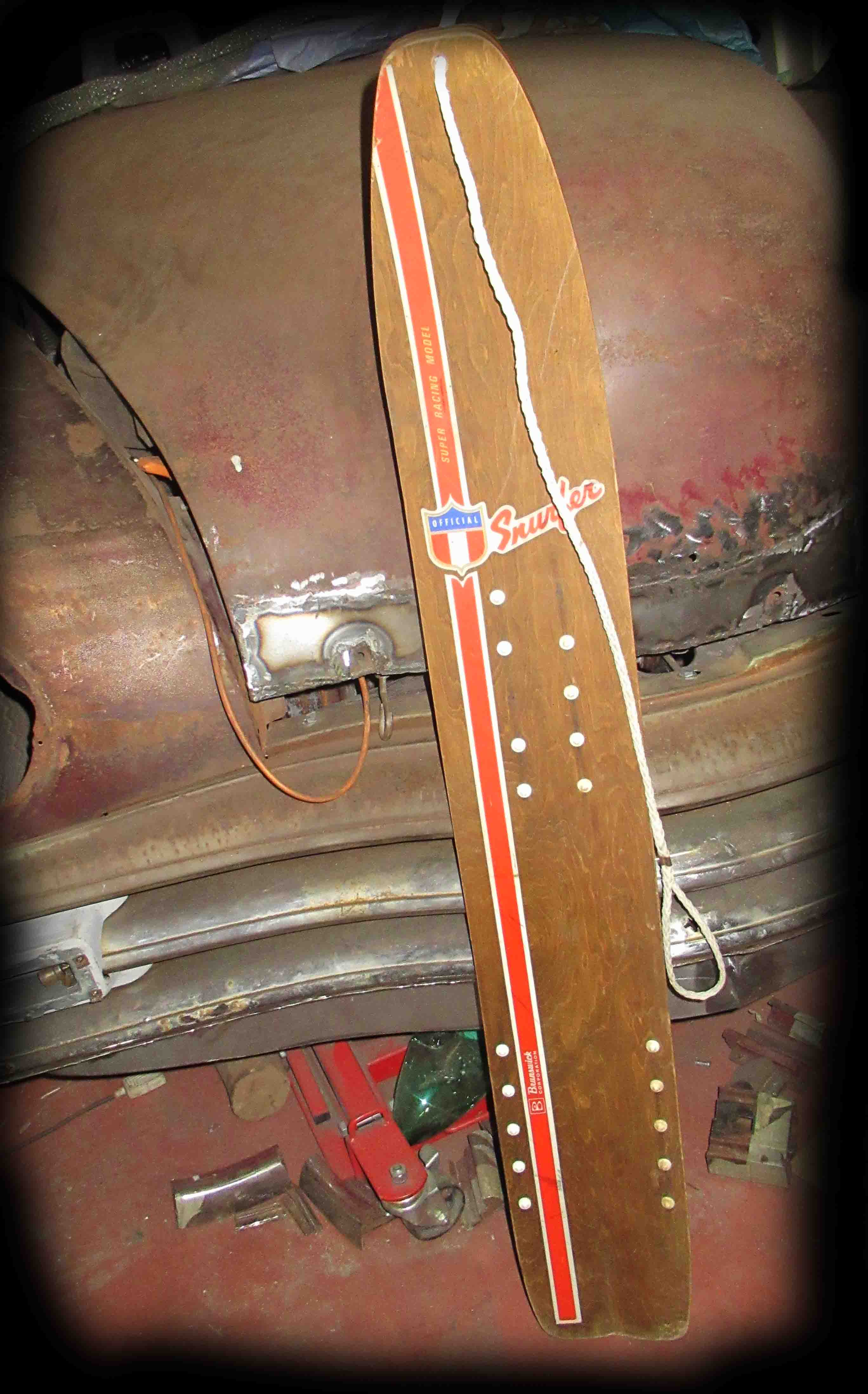
A 1967 Snurfer

Sherman Poppen originally created the device on Christmas Day in 1965, for the amusement of his children. His wife, Nancy, named the invention, noting that the board allowed the rider to surf on snow (thus the name combining snow and surfer).

In 1966, Poppen licensed the product to the Brunswick Corporation, and worked with them to develop a manufacturing technique. Brunswick marketed the snurfer as a novelty item, not sports equipment. With the help of Cee-J Wholesale Toy Company (Carl and Luella Suchovsky in Muskegon Heights, MI), the Snurfer was distributed all over the country.

From 1968 through the late 1970s, snurfer racing competitions were held in Muskegon, Michigan. In 1968 more than 200 spectators watched a snurfing championship. Brunswick discontinued production in 1972, but JEM Corporation continued manufacture until the early 1980s. By 1977, Jake Burton Carpenter, an avid competitive snurfer, began developing an improved model without the rope and with the addition of rigid bindings for ski boots to the board. As more resorts began allowing snowboards on their ski lifts, the popularity of the snurfer waned. Poppen took up snowboarding at the age of 67. He has been recognized by the snowboarding community as the grandfather of the sport being inducted into the Snowboarding Hall of Fame in Banff Canada in 1995.

== The Snurfer club ==
Improvements to the Snurfer design have been made in other parts of the world as well. In 1973, the Snurfer was shown at the Sport and Recreation in the USA exhibition held in Moscow, Russia. Boris Kovalev, a handyman from Moscow began making Snurfers out of vinyl plastic, and started the first Snurfer club for the local kids. This club had around 30 members.

In 1980, two of them, Aleksey Ostatnigrosh and Alexei Melnikov, with Boris Kovalev’s help, started changing the design of the Snurfer to allow jumping and to improve control on hard packed snow. First, they attached a bungee cord to the Snurfer tail which the rider could grab before jumping. In 1982, Aleksey Ostatnigrosh and Alexei Melnikov attached a foot binding to the Snurfer and patented their innovation.

== Snurfer in Popular Culture ==
The Snurfer can be seen in the sets of SCHOOL of ROCK. Look to the window of the set of the classroom, and it is leaning in the window as a visual prop. The variation used in the scene is the traditional yellow and black version. Laurie Poppen, daughter of Sherman, discovered this by accident when watching the movie in December of 2024.
