= Nidecker =

Swiss snowboard company

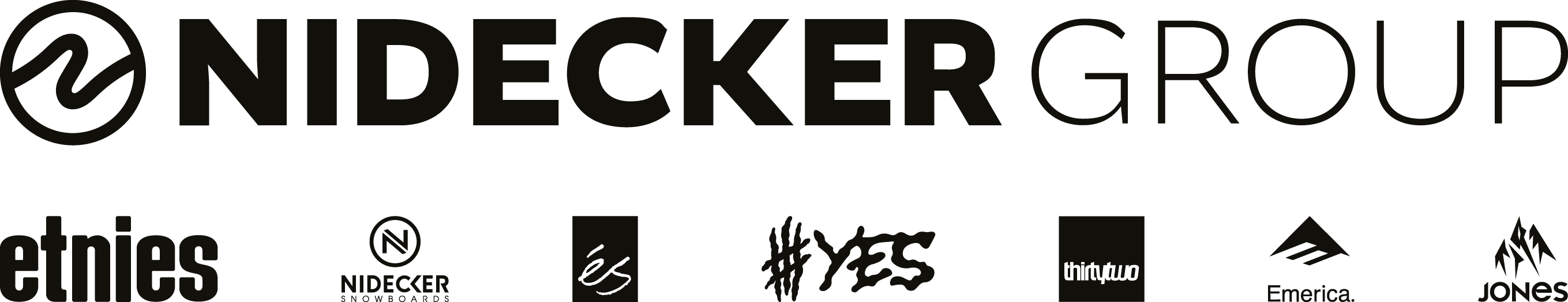
- Nidecker Group Logo with Brands
- Type: Private
- Industry: Snowboard, splitboard, skateboarding footwear
- Founded: 1887; 139 years ago
- Founder: Henri Nidecker
- Headquarters: Rolle, Switzerland
- Brands: Nidecker; Bataleon; Rome SDS; Jones Snowboards; ThirtyTwo; etnies; Emerica; éS
- Number of employees: 200
- Subsidiaries: Low Pressure Studio
- Website: www.ndk.group

Nidecker is a Swiss snowboard brand and family-owned board-sports company based in Rolle, Switzerland. Founded in 1887 in Etoy, Switzerland, it began as a wood-products manufacturer and entered snowboard manufacturing in 1984.

The broader Nidecker Group, also referred to as NDK Group, operates board-sports brands including Nidecker, Jones Snowboards, Bataleon, Rome, etnies, éS, Emerica and ThirtyTwo.

It is considered the second biggest snowboard company in the world. The company was passed down 5 generations. The Nidecker Group was formed in 2008 by three descendants of Henri: Henry, Xavier and Cédric Nidecker. Henry Nidecker is the CEO of the company.

In 2017 the Nidecker Group bought American binding specialist Flow. In 2018, they acquired the brands Bataleon and Rome.

== History ==
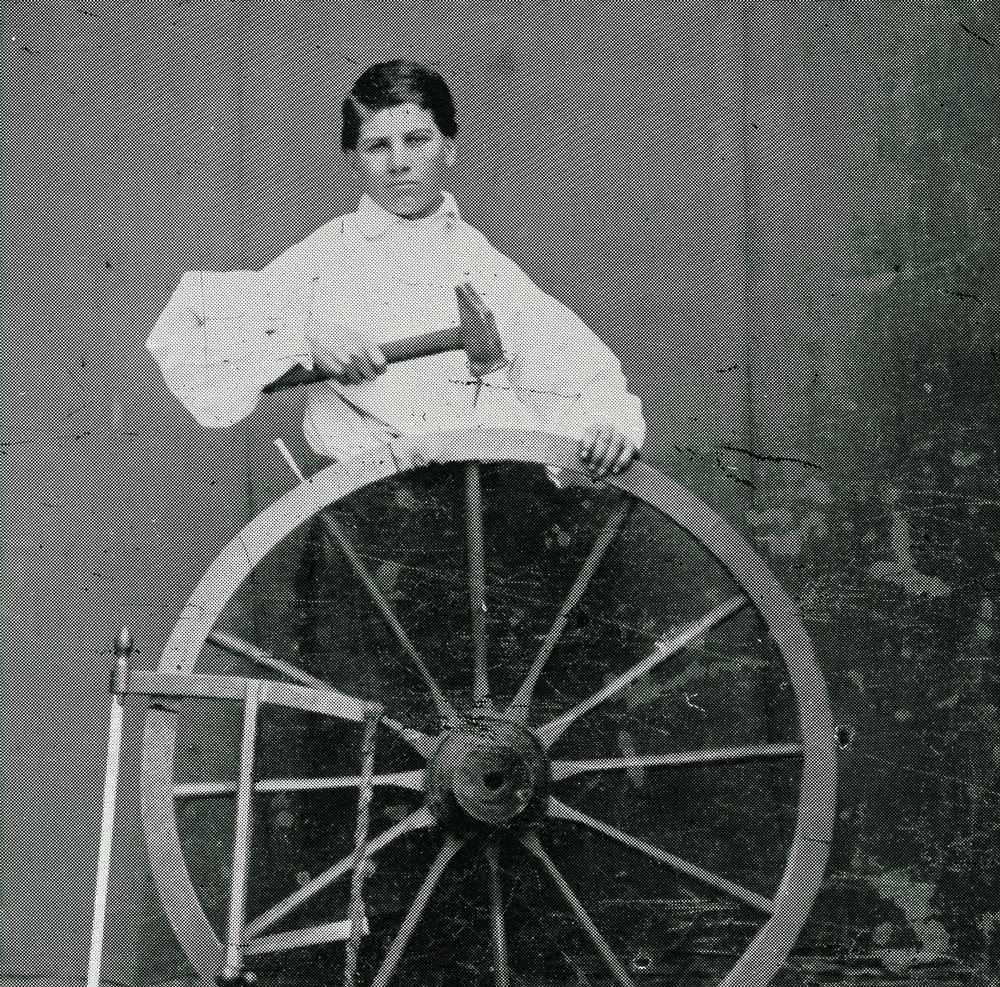
Henri I in his workshop in Etoy in 1887

Nidecker was started by Swiss entrepreneur Henri Nidecker in 1887. The company began as an agricultural equipment maker for Swiss farmers on the shores of Lake Geneva. Henri I was trained as carpenter and became a specialist in the "art of bending wood" after purchasing the first electric motor in the region built for this purpose.

It wasn't until 1912 however, that Nidecker began producing skis after Henri I's son, Henri II produced their first pairs from ash. By the 1940s Nidecker was well established in the production of skis and in 1946 Henri III created the world's first composite wood skis combining ash and hickory.

Nidecker continued producing skis and in 1962 became one of the first companies to manufacture skis built with metal and fiberglass. In 1977, under the leadership of Henri IV, Nidecker won a gold medal at the 6th International Ski Show in Geneva for their new ski skin system called the Varai-Clix.

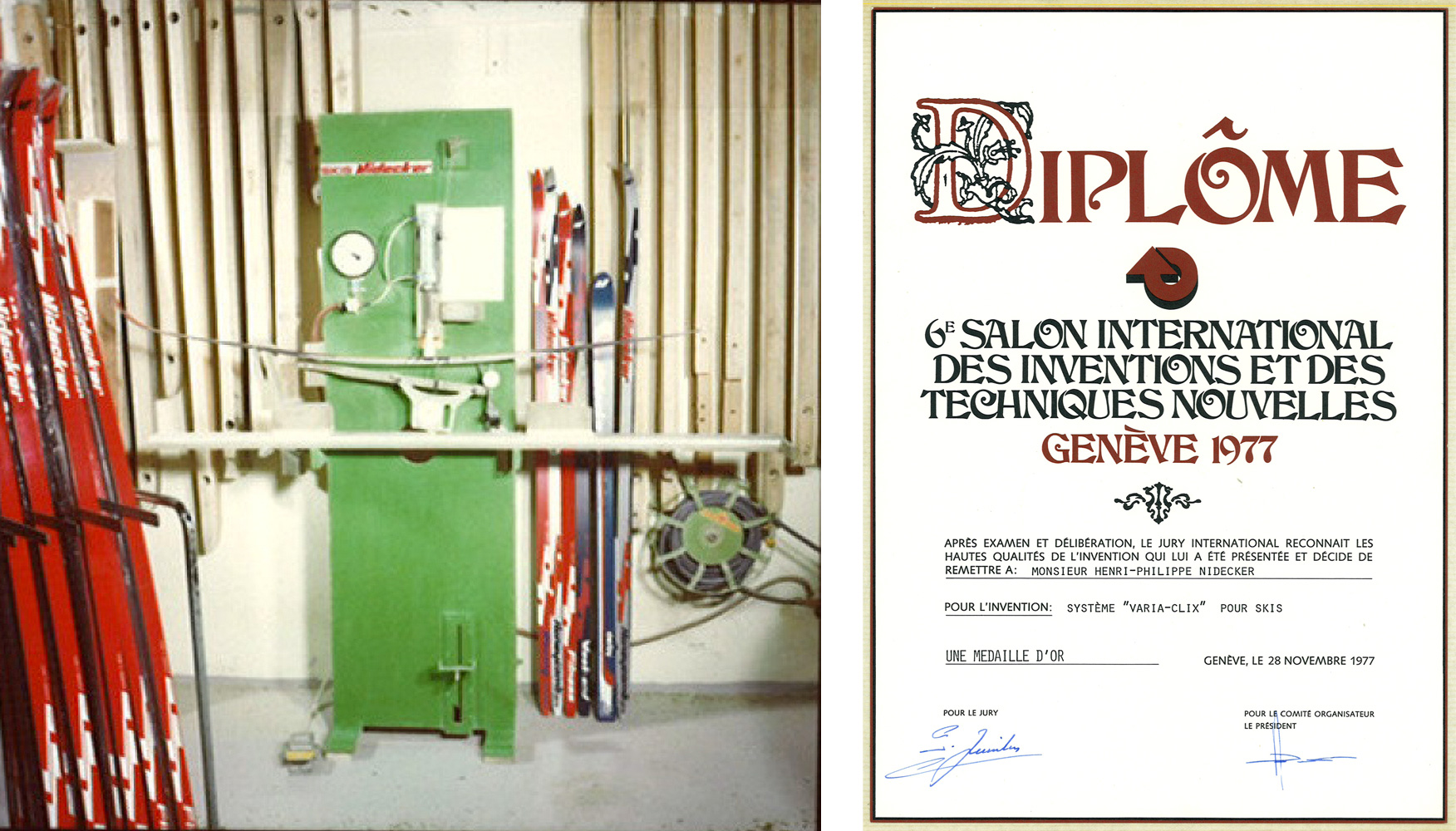
A copy of the certificate and image of the machine that won Nidecker the gold medal at the 6th International Ski Show in 1977

In 1984, Nidecker joined the snowboard market releasing their first series of 50 snowboards. They then increased their manufacturing output to 700 snowboards in 1985.

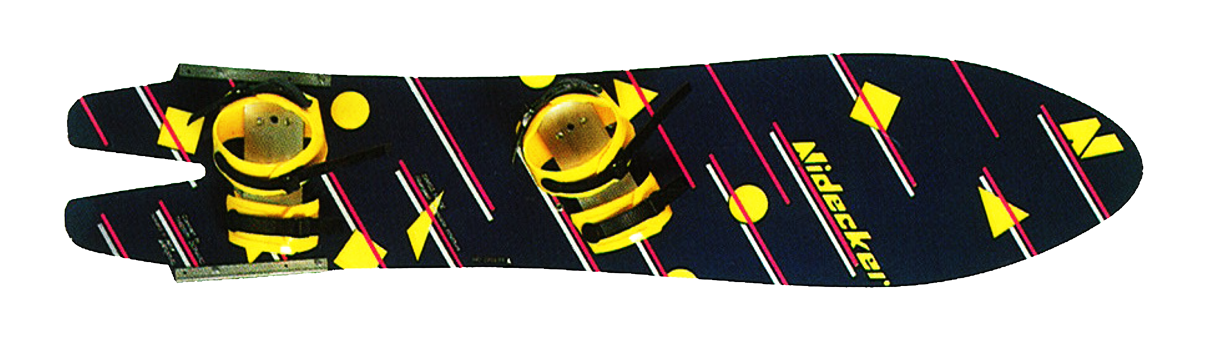
An image of the first snowboard Nidecker produced and launched in 1984. Only 50 boards of this model were released.

In 2008 the Nidecker Group was formed by Cédric, Henry, and Xavier Nidecker, the three sons of Henri IV. Henry Nidecker became CEO of the company. In 2009, in collaboration with Romain de Marchi, JP Solberg, and David Carrier Porcheron (DCP), Nidecker launched YES. The following year, in 2010, Nidecker partnered with professional snowboarder Jeremy Jones to launch Jones Snowboards. In the same year YES. won EuroSIMA's Breakthrough Brand Award.

In 2012 Nidecker launched NOW bindings in partnership with former professional snowboarder JF Pelchat. Following on from their previous success in 2017 Nidecker acquired the binding and boot manufacturer Flow.

In 2018, the Nidecker Group acquired the Dutch-based company Low Pressure Studio, owners of Bataleon, Lobster, and Switchback, and Rome SDS joined Low Pressure Studio.

In May 2024, the Nidecker Group acquired skateboarding brands etnies, éS, and Emerica, and snowboarding brand ThirtyTwo from Sole Technology. The acquisition signifies Nidecker's entrance into the skateboarding market.

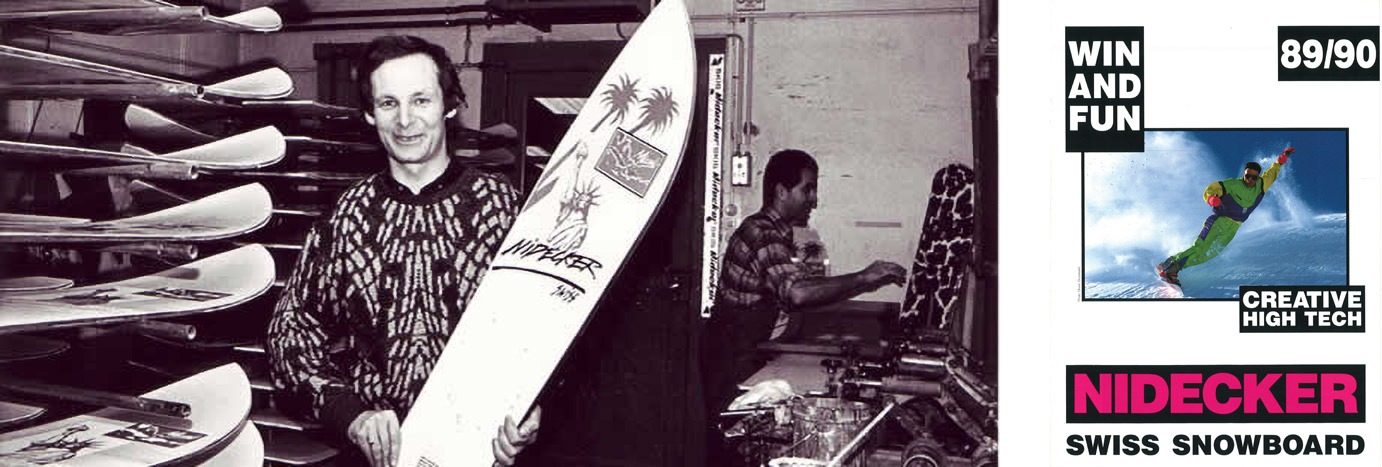
Henri Nidecker in his workshop in 1989 on the left. The marketing campaign for the same model of snowboard that year.
