= Jones Snowboards =

American snowboard equipment company

- Jones Snowboards' Current Logo
- Company type: Private
- Industry: Sports equipment; Snowboards
- Founded: 2009; 17 years ago
- Founder: Jeremy Jones
- Headquarters: Truckee, CA, United States
- Key people: Jeremy Jones (CEO)
- Products: Snowboards; Splitboards; Snowboard bindings; Technical outerwear
- Number of employees: 20 (2019)
- Website: jonessnowboards.com

Jones Snowboards is an American manufacturer of snowboards, bindings, and snowboarding clothing and accessories based in Truckee near Lake Tahoe, California. The company was founded in 2009 by renowned freeride snowboarder Jeremy Jones. The company has received numerous awards for its snowboards. Jones snowboards are manufactured in Dubai.

Jones Snowboards was founded in 2010 by Jeremy Jones in collaboration with Nidecker Snowboards. Jones Snowboards is now part of the Nidecker Group. The Nidecker Group (NDK Group) is made up of the brands; Nidecker, Flow, Jones, YES., and Now.

== Environmental focus ==
Jones Snowboards has a stated focus on environmental causes, especially the fight against climate change. This includes efforts to manufacture their boards in an environmentally friendly manner, and the donation of 1% of sales to sustainability-focused non-profits. Jones Snowboards also promotes avalanche safety, and includes their "5 Red Flags" in the artwork on some of their snowboards and packaging materials.

Jones Snowboards has a strong design ethos behind all of their products. Since 2020, Jones snowboards and splitboards are made using 100% solar power. This led the company to announce an 89% drop in production related CO_{2} emissions.

== Competitive success ==
In December 2019, Jones Snowboards announced that French snowboarder Victor De Le Rue would join as a new global team rider. Victor went on to win the 2021 Freeride World Tour on the Jones Snowboards Aviator 2.0.

== Design innovation ==
In 2022, Jones Snowboards highlighted the spiritual and technical link to surfing by combining forces with the well-known surfboard shaper Chris Christenson. Known for his ability to shape fast-gliding surfboards, Christenson helped design the new Surf Series snowboards.

For the 2023/24 winter season, Jones Snowboards announced the launch of the Butterfly Splitboard. The splitboard's design was focused on maximising efficiency in both climbing and riding. The 2023/24 winter season products also included an increased focus on the use of recycled materials in the construction of the products. The Hovercraft 2.0 model featured a brand new technology in snowboard construction known as, Recycle Tech.
