= Sole Technology =

American footwear and apparel company

Sole Technology, Inc.
- Industry: Footwear; Apparel
- Founded: 1996
- Headquarters: Lake Forest, California, United States
- Products: Skate shoes; Snowboard boots; Action sports apparel
- Brands: Etnies; éS Skateboarding; Emerica; ThirtyTwo; Altamont Apparel; STI Lab
- Owner: Pierre-André Senizergues
- Website: soletechnology.com

Sole Technology, Inc., known informally as Sole Tech, is an American footwear and apparel company, specializing in skate shoe design, production and distribution. The company is owned and operated by Pierre-André Senizergues, a former professional freestyle skateboarder. The company's headquarters are in Lake Forest, California, United States.

== History ==
Sole Technology was founded in 1996 to be the parent company of the etnies, éS, Emerica and ThirtyTwo brands.

The Sole Technology Institute (STI) was established in 2003. STI Lab is a first-of-its-kind research and development facility that conducts biomechanical skate shoe research.

In May 2024, etnies, éS, Emerica and ThirtyTwo were acquired by Nidecker Group, a Swiss action sports equipment conglomerate. Following the acquisition, a new company was created to operate the four brands under Nidecker, with Pierre-André assuming the role of CEO for each of them. The Sole Technology name will gradually be phased out.

== Brands ==
=== Etnies ===
The company's first and largest brand is etnies. Established in 1986, etnies produces footwear and apparel for skateboarding, BMX, motocross, surfing and snowboarding—the brand also sponsors teams in all of these "action sports." From 2005 to 2011, the company also operated etnies plus, a sub-brand which specialized in limited-run footwear.

Etnies sponsored athletes include Ryan Sheckler, Willow, Nick Garcia, Jose Rojo, Chris Joslin and David Reyes.

=== éS Skateboarding ===
éS Skateboarding is a skateboarding footwear and apparel brand founded in 1995. In 2024, it was acquired by Nidecker Group along with etnies, Emerica and ThirtyTwo.

The brand subsequently sponsored a team that included professional skateboarders John Rattray, PJ Ladd, Eric Koston, Paul Rodriguez, Ronnie Creager, Chad Muska, Justin Eldridge, Rodrigo Teixeira (TX), Bob Burnquist, Arto Saari, Nyjah Huston, Tom Penny, and Rick McCrank.

After announcing a hiatus in mid-2012, the brand returned in 2014 with special edition runs of their shoes distributed to select skateboard shops.

=== Emerica ===
Emerica was launched in 1996, and, in addition to selling apparel, has produced a number of skateboarding-themed videos. Their 2013 video, MADE: Chapter One, was offered to consumers at a price of their choosing, with a minimum price of US$1.00 established.

In July 2013, the brand released its "Workwear" line, a collaboration with skateboarder Andrew Reynolds.

Emerica sponsors a skateboard team which includes Collin Provost, Ed Templeton, Justin "Figgy" Figueroa, Kevin "Spanky" Long, Leo Romero, Jeremy Leabres, Jon Dickson, Eric Winkowski, Rob Maatman, Dakota Servold, Kevin Baekkel, Victor Aceves and Chris Wimer.

=== ThirtyTwo ===
ThirtyTwo, a snowboarding boots, apparel, and outerwear brand, was launched in 1995 by snowboarders and has been privately held since that time. As of September 2013, the brand sponsors a team of snowboarders.

ThirtyTwo's Global Pro team includes J. P. Walker, Jeremy Jones, Scott Stevens, Chris Grenier, Chris Bradshaw, Halldór Helgason, Jordan Small, Johnny O'Connor, Joe Sexton, Corey Smith, Dylan Alito, Toni Kerkela, Desiree Melancon, Zeb Powell, Pat Fava and Phil Hansen.

Its Global Am team includes Brandon Hobush, Spencer Schubert, Chris Brewster, Toni Kerkela, Benny Urban, Dylan Alito and Johnny O'Connor.

=== Altamont Apparel ===
Altamont Apparel was launched in October 2006 as a concept of Justin Regan and Reynolds, who enlisted UK artist Mark "Fos" Foster as the head designer. Over time, the brand has expanded beyond skateboarding to involve musicians and artists.
