= Backcountry snowboarding =

Snowboarding in isolated rural areas

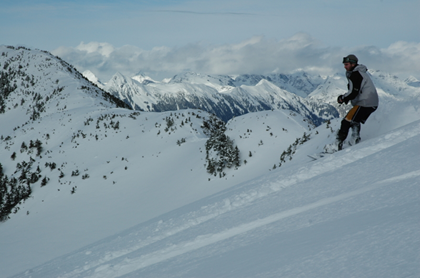
A backcountry snowboarder.

Backcountry snowboarding is snowboarding in a sparsely inhabited rural region over ungroomed and unmarked slopes or pistes in the backcountry, frequently amongst trees ("glade boarding"), usually in pursuit of fresh fallen snow, known as powder. Often, the land and the snow pack are not monitored, patrolled, or maintained. Fixed mechanical means of ascent such as ski lifts are typically not present, but alternative means such as splitboarding, hiking, snowshoeing and helicopters ("heliskiing") are sometimes used to reach the mountain's peak.

== History ==
In the early 1960s, at the height of surfing's popularity, the first snowboard ever was created by a chemical engineer named Sherman Poppen in Muskegon, Michigan. Poppen was inspired by watching his daughter attempt to sled down a hill standing up and so he decided to fashion his skis together and then tie rope to the nose for more stability. His wife named his creation the "Snurfer", a combination of snow and surfer, and between 1966 and 1977, Poppen sold over half a million all around the country. The snurfer was originally marketed to kids in grocery stores but when more traditional models were created, they were marketed to surfers and skateboarders. Despite the increasing popularity, snowboarding was seen as a gimmick and wasn't recognized as a true sport. More importantly, it was banned from all ski resorts in North America, forcing any prospective boarders to look elsewhere. Backcountry snowboarding became the original kind of snowboarding simply because there was no other choice, boards were specifically designed for powder snow and the experimental board designs weren't designed for groomers. It wasn't until the 1980s that snowboarders were finally accepted into resorts. Despite the new access to resorts and lifts, some boarders chose to continue to ride in the backcountry.

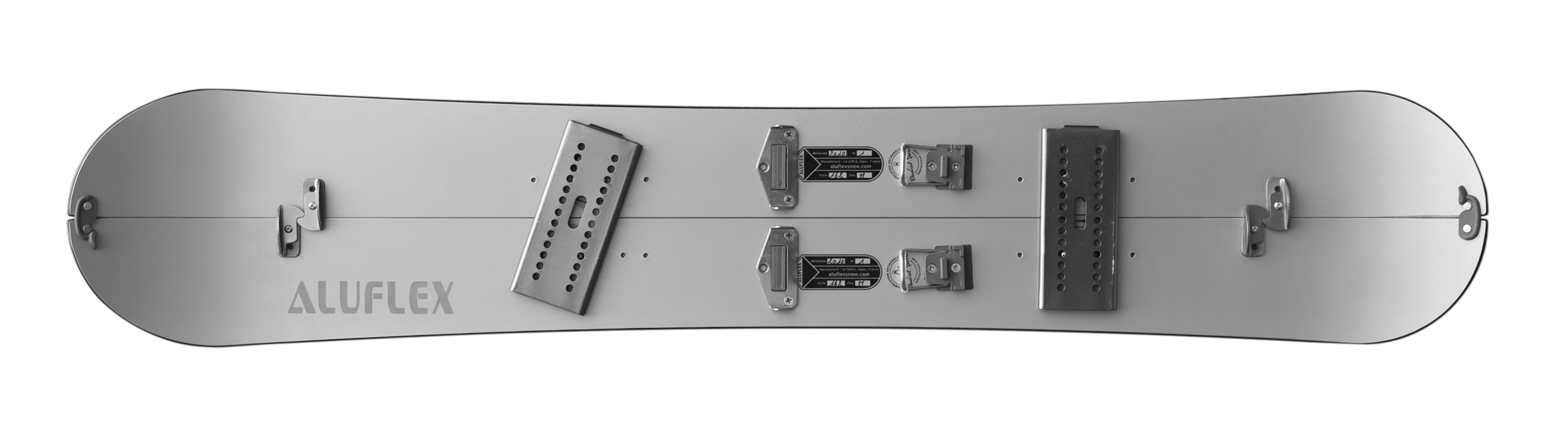
Aluflex Splitboard

In the late 1980s, a snowboarder named Brett Kobernick changed the backcountry snowboarding game forever by cutting a snowboard in half with a hacksaw and then using the two halves to get up the mountain and reattaching them to descend. This later became known as splitboarding and has become an increasingly popular alternative to hiking or snowshoeing. Splitboards gives snowboarders the range and versatility of alpine touring skis while retaining the freedom of a snowboard for the descent. Unlike using snow shoes to access backcountry, the rider does not need to carry a board during the ascent, and does not need to carry snow shoes on the descent.

== Safety Issues and Prevention ==
Although backcountry snowboarding is rising in popularity, activities normally performed in backcountry are dramatically different and more dangerous than those performed in winter resorts. Those participating in backcountry runs do not have access to runs that have been logged, bulldozed or previously tested, as well as quick help via snow patrol. This difference causes many more health and safety issues to arise. In general, musculoskeletal injuries suffered in the backcountry occur at a similar rate to those in the resorts due to the fact that the riders venturing in to these areas normally have a certain level of experience. However, backcountry snowboarders are susceptible to more environmental issues like avalanche, frostbite, hypothermia, dehydration, and excessive fatigue due to the lack of snow patrol or warming huts. With that being said, the largest risk when riding in uncharted areas is deep snow immersion asphyxiation. This occurs when riders fall head first into very deep snow, normally around a tree well. The unfortunate occurrence makes it hard for snowboarders to right themselves and they suffocate or essentially “drown” in the snow.

When planning to ride in uncharted areas, snowboarders must follow a list of requirements to ensure their safety. This list includes:

- Seek formal instruction – Many participants are used to riding within resort limits where danger is limited. Before graduating to the backcountry, riders should complete a course specific to chartering unmarked areas.
- Practice Routinely – Riding in areas that are outside of resort limits can be very difficult. Without a good amount of practice and experience riders can find their way in to dangerous situations.
- Ride with a partner – Having a partner with you at all times is essential to preventing dangerous situations as well as responding to them. When a rider experiences trouble, his or her partner can either call for help or, if safe enough to do so, help the other himself.
- Do not exceed skill level – Snowboarders should only engage in off-resort riding once they can master the most difficult resort runs. Riders who are not competent in areas ungroomed or previously ridden in should not attempt to ride there until improvement is made.
- Check weather conditions prior to going out – Foul weather can make for unforeseen problems on a slope. Riders should check both weather and snow conditions before engaging in a run.
- Carry an alternate form or transportation – When ascending hills or traveling through traverse flats, another form of transportation is essential. It may be difficult to get through deep snow with just a snowboard when not going down hill. To avoid these situations, having snowshoes, short skis or a splitboard is key.
- Use good judgment – Although backcountry riders normally are seeking a tough and thrilling experience, using safe judgment can prevent dangerous situations from occurring.
- Learn and exercise avalanche safety – Avalanches are common in the backcountry so learning what to do if one occurs as well as how to avoid them is necessary for safe mountain riding.

Following these guidelines is imperative to preventing dangerous situations in the backcountry. Practicing these, a rider can ensure he is prepared by also having a pack of emergency supplies at all times. In addition to a helmet and snowboard repair tools, a rider should carry basic safety gear including a map, compass, headlamp, matches, food, water, extra clothing, first aid kit, and water purification tablets. Being prepared for an emergency when riding in the backcountry is crucial considering there is normally no form of help near by.

== Equipment ==
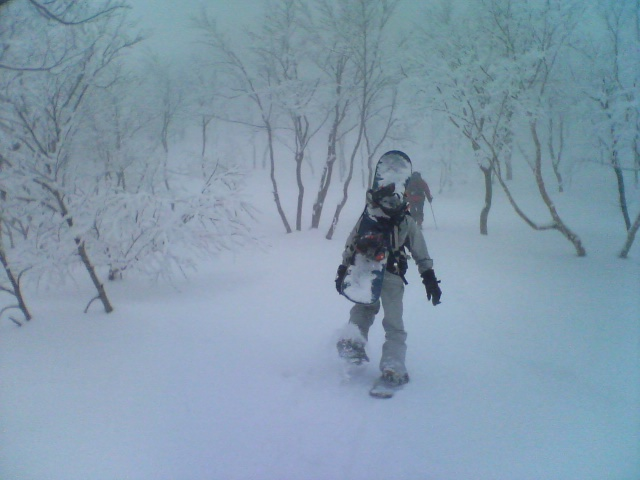
Backcountry snowboarder ascending up the slope on snowshoes.

Considering backcountry snowboarders are in a much more isolated area than people who choose to snowboard at a resort, it is imperative that the proper equipment and tools are packed in order to reach your desired location. While some backcountry trails can be accessed by hiking, some slopes can be very difficult to get to. Oftentimes, it is not feasible to ascend the slopes solely using a snowboard. Common alternative forms of transportation include snow shoeing, or using short skis. These items are ideal because they are short enough to attach to a pack without having to worry about them dragging on the ground when descending the slope.^{[1]} The splitboard is also commonly used as it does not require carrying additional equipment for transportation.^{[2]}

Backcountry snowboarders should also consider the type of board they use when descending the slopes. The preferred structure of a snowboard differs depending on the desired use of the snowboard (halfpipe, racing, rail riding, etc.). When it comes to backcountry slopes, snowboarders are looking for slopes with fresh powder. The shape of the underside of the snowboard is one element that will effect the board's ride. The terms rocker and camber are used to describe the profile of the board's shape. A camber board has one upward arc in the center of the board with the front and back end of the board touching the ground. A rocker board (or reverse camber) has a downward arc in the center so the front and back of the board have an upward curve and are therefore not touching the ground. Although it can have a slippery feel at first, most backcountry boarders prefer the rocker style snowboard rather than the camber style. The rocker style board provides more flexibility and maneuverability which is ideal for backcountry areas. ^{[3]}

Besides the equipment needed to access the slopes, backcountry travelers of any kind should also consider bringing mountaineering equipment as a safety precaution.^{[4]} Considering the extreme danger someone could be in due to an avalanche occurring, it is encouraged that boarders bring an avalanche airbag pack. An avalanche airbag pack can be a life-saving device. The pack is designed to inflating if a victim becomes caught in an avalanche. The device helps the victim stay close to the surface if they are being carried in the snow, and the inflation of the device helps create a barrier between the victim and the snow to help prevent them from being suffocated by the snow.^{[5]}

== Notable people ==
- Jeremy Jones is a widely celebrated freerider and has received recognition for being "Big Mountain Rider of the Year" from the Snowboarder magazine 10 different times. Jeremy is also the younger brother to Teton Gravity Research founders Steve and Todd Jones. He is known for his Deeper, Further, Higher film trilogy, produced and directed by TGR. The films have revolutionized backcountry snowboarding with its dedication to split boarding, human powered adventure, and the pursuit of some of the most remote mountain ranges in the world. The second film, Further, helped Jones be recognized as National Geographic's "Adventurer of the Year" in 2013.
- Travis Rice has been recognised as being one of the best snowboarders of all time by a number of publications and outlets and as a pioneer of big mountain freeriding. Although he is known as a jack of all trades when it comes to snowboarding styles, he is also known as "backbountry bulldozer". He is well known for co-producing and starring in popular snowboard films "That's It That's All" and "The Art of Flight" that received wide praise and success and helped him land numerous awards, including Transworld and Snowboarder magazine Rider of the Year. Rice, with the help of Red Bull, also coordinated a backcountry slopestyle competition named Supernatural, that he hoped would harness the appeal of backcountry into a competition.

== See also ==
- Splitboard
- Alpine snowboarding
- Backcountry skiing
