= Johan Olofsson =

Johan Olofsson may refer to:

- Johan Olofsson (ice hockey) (born 1994), Swedish ice hockey player
- Johan Olofsson (snowboarder) (born 1976), Swedish snowboarder
