= Two Leaves and a Bud (Tea Company) =

American organic tea company

- Type: Private
- Industry: Beverage
- Founded: 2004
- Founder: Richard Rosenfeld
- Headquarters: Basalt, Colorado, United States
- Area served: United States and internationally
- Products: Organic whole leaf tea sachets, loose leaf teas, iced teas, matcha, tea lattes
- Website: www.twoleavestea.com

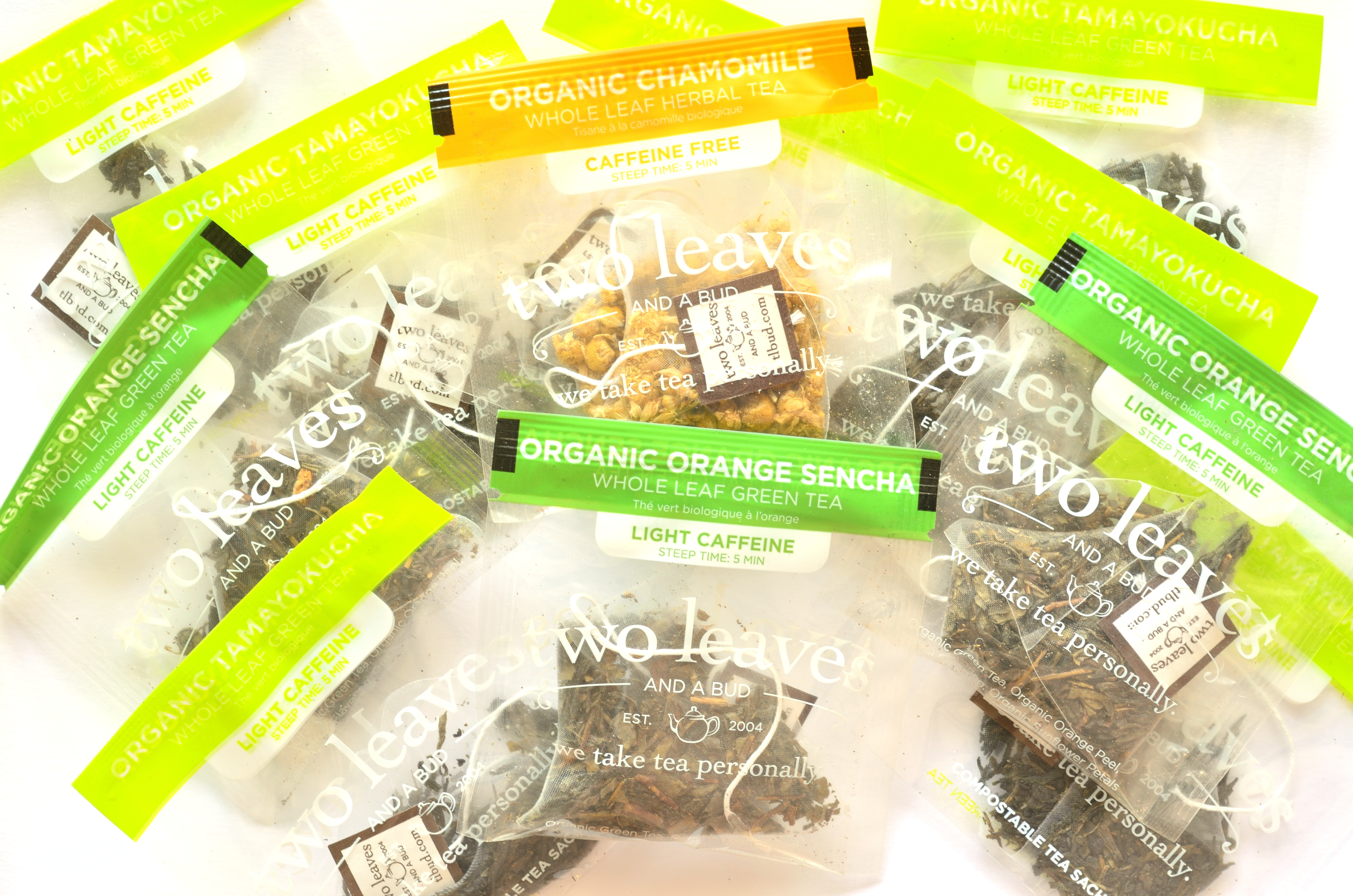
Two Leaves and a Bud organic tea

Two Leaves and a Bud is an American organic tea company founded in 2004 and headquartered in Basalt, Colorado. The company manufactures and distributes whole leaf organic teas packaged in pyramid-shaped, plant-based compostable sachets, and is recognized as one of the first companies in North America to offer organic teas in compostable pyramid-shaped sachets.

== History ==
Two Leaves and a Bud was founded in 2004 by Richard Rosenfeld after he traveled extensively throughout Asia and developed a passion for fresh, whole-leaf tea. Rosenfeld visited tea gardens in Sri Lanka, India, and China to develop relationships with organic tea farmers before launching the company from Basalt, Colorado.

The company was named after the part of the Camellia sinensis plant harvested to produce the highest-quality tea: the top two leaves and a single bud.

Originally intending to build a loose-leaf tea business, Rosenfeld pivoted to whole-leaf tea sachets early in the company's history to better serve the foodservice and retail markets. Two Leaves and a Bud became one of the earliest adopters of plant-based, compostable sachet materials in North America.

The company's teas are available in cafes, grocery stores, and specialty shops across the United States and internationally.

In 2020, during the COVID-19 pandemic, the company donated shipments of tea to nursing home residents across the United States as part of a community outreach initiative.

Two Leaves and a Bud was recognized with the Colorado Companies to Watch Award, a program run by the Colorado Office of Economic Development and International Trade that annually recognizes 50 innovative companies for their positive impact on Colorado's economy.

== Products ==
Two Leaves and a Bud produces a range of certified USDA organic teas, including black, green, white, herbal, and wellness varieties, sourced from tea-growing regions primarily in India and China, as well as Sri Lanka. The company also sources organic peppermint from farms in Eastern Washington State.

Its product lines include:

- Whole leaf tea sachets — pyramid-shaped sachets made from plant-based, compostable PLA film, available in over 20 varietals
- Loose leaf teas — certified organic loose leaf options across multiple tea types
- Iced teas — organic iced tea bags in multiple flavors
- Tea lattes — powdered latte mixes including Nice Chai and Nice Matcha
- Matcha — finely ground Japanese matcha in plain and sweetened varieties
- Purpose-Filled Teas — an organic wellness range including Detox, Energize, Invigorate, and Hydrate blends

All teas are certified gluten-free, vegan, and kosher.

== Sustainability ==
Two Leaves and a Bud has prioritized environmental sustainability since its founding. The company was among the first in North America to offer organic teas packaged in compostable pyramid-shaped sachets.

All tea sachets and wrappers are made from PLA (polylactic acid), a plant-based, petroleum-free, certified compostable material. The company holds organic certifications in both the United States and the European Union.

Two Leaves and a Bud sources teas from organic gardens where growers are fairly paid, and makes sourcing decisions based on environmental and ethical standards rather than price or availability. The company donates one percent of sales from its Purpose-Filled Teas range to Protect Our Winters, a nonprofit climate-advocacy organization.

== Awards ==
- 2012 North American Tea Championships — First place, Jasmine Petal tea
- 2013 North American Tea Championships — Second place, Paisley Brand Organic Chai
- Colorado Companies to Watch Award — Recognized as one of Colorado's 50 most innovative second-stage companies
