= Death of Kerstin Gurtner =

2025 climbing death on the Grossglockner

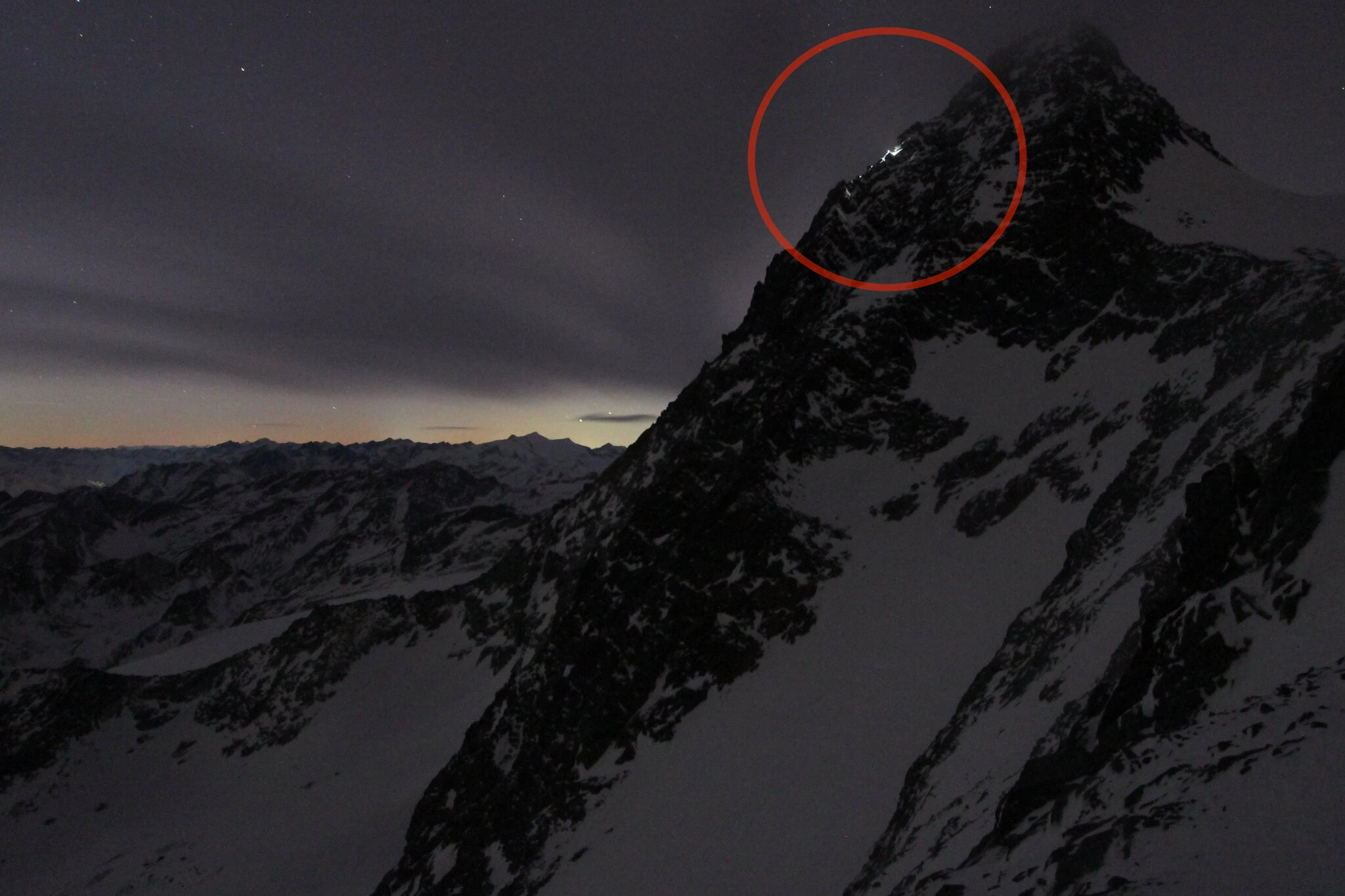
Gurtner and Plamberger's headlamps are visible as they attempt to continue their ascent of the Grossglockner on the night of 18 January 2025

In the early morning on 19 January 2025, Kerstin Gurtner died while attempting to summit the Grossglockner in Austria with her boyfriend, Thomas Plamberger. For disputed reasons, Plamberger left Gurtner behind on the slope during the night as conditions worsened, and she died of hypothermia before rescuers could arrive. The case received attention in the press and on social media, with controversy centering on Plamberger's responsibility to protect his less-experienced partner and on the dynamics between men and women in relationships during outdoor activities.

The expedition began as an attempted single-day ascent on January 18, but the couple had been slowed by issues including problems with equipment and weather. As night fell, alpine police were notified of the couple's presence on the mountain and began rescue efforts, sending a rescue helicopter and attempting to contact Plamberger by phone. The couple did not acknowledge the helicopter and Plamberger declined help from rescuers over the phone as conditions worsened. In the early morning hours of January 19, Plamberger left Gurtner around 50 m (160 ft) short of the summit, according to him because he was leaving to get help, notifying rescuers that Gurtner needed help around 3 am. Gurtner died of hypothermia before she could be rescued; her body was recovered the following morning.

Plamberger was tried for negligent homicide in Gurtner's death on 19 February 2026. Andrea Bergner, an ex-girlfriend of Plamberger's, testified that he had left her behind on a different previous trip to Grossglockner. Plamberger was found guilty and was sentenced to a five-month suspended prison sentence with a €9,600 fine, which commentators described as a lenient sentence. Both Plamberger and the prosecution filed appeals.

The case sparked debate in the climbing community about individual and legal responsibility in the activity, as well as on social media, with women sharing stories of partners abandoning them in the outdoors, known as alpine divorce.

== People involved ==
Kerstin Gurtner and Thomas Plamberger pictured together

=== Kerstin Gurtner ===
Kerstin Gurtner (born 1991 or 1992), identified in court documents as "Kerstin G.", was an Austrian skier and competitive trail runner. She was 33 years old at the time of her death. Gurtner was described by her parents as a strong athlete with a tough, feisty personality who "never gave up." Her parents said she had become more active in mountaineering starting in 2020.

=== Thomas Plamberger ===
Thomas Plamberger (born 1988 or 1989), identified in court documents as "Thomas P.", is an Austrian professional chef and a hobbyist mountaineer from Salzburg. He was 36 years old at the time of Gurtner's death. He had learned mountaineering through climbing with his father, an experienced mountaineer, and by watching videos online.

He was involved in the mountaineering community online, frequently posting or commenting on mountaineering posts on Instagram and Facebook, though his relationship with this community was often unfriendly. In one example, he replied to a post by two-time Freeride World Tour champion Eva Walkner questioning why she had not gone higher up on the face of Hoher Göll. After Gurtner's death received social media attention, Walkner replied to the post, "Because turning back when conditions become too dangerous is what distinguishes good and experienced alpinists."

=== Relationship ===
According to a friend of Gurtner, Plamberger and Gurtner had met at the Hochkönigman trail running event near Maria Alm. Plamberger testified in court that the two of them had met online. They began dating approximately a year before the incident. With Plamberger, Gurtner began mountaineering more seriously compared to her previous interest in skiing and trail running, with Plamberger providing guidance and equipment for her learning.

== Incident ==
=== Planning of the climb ===
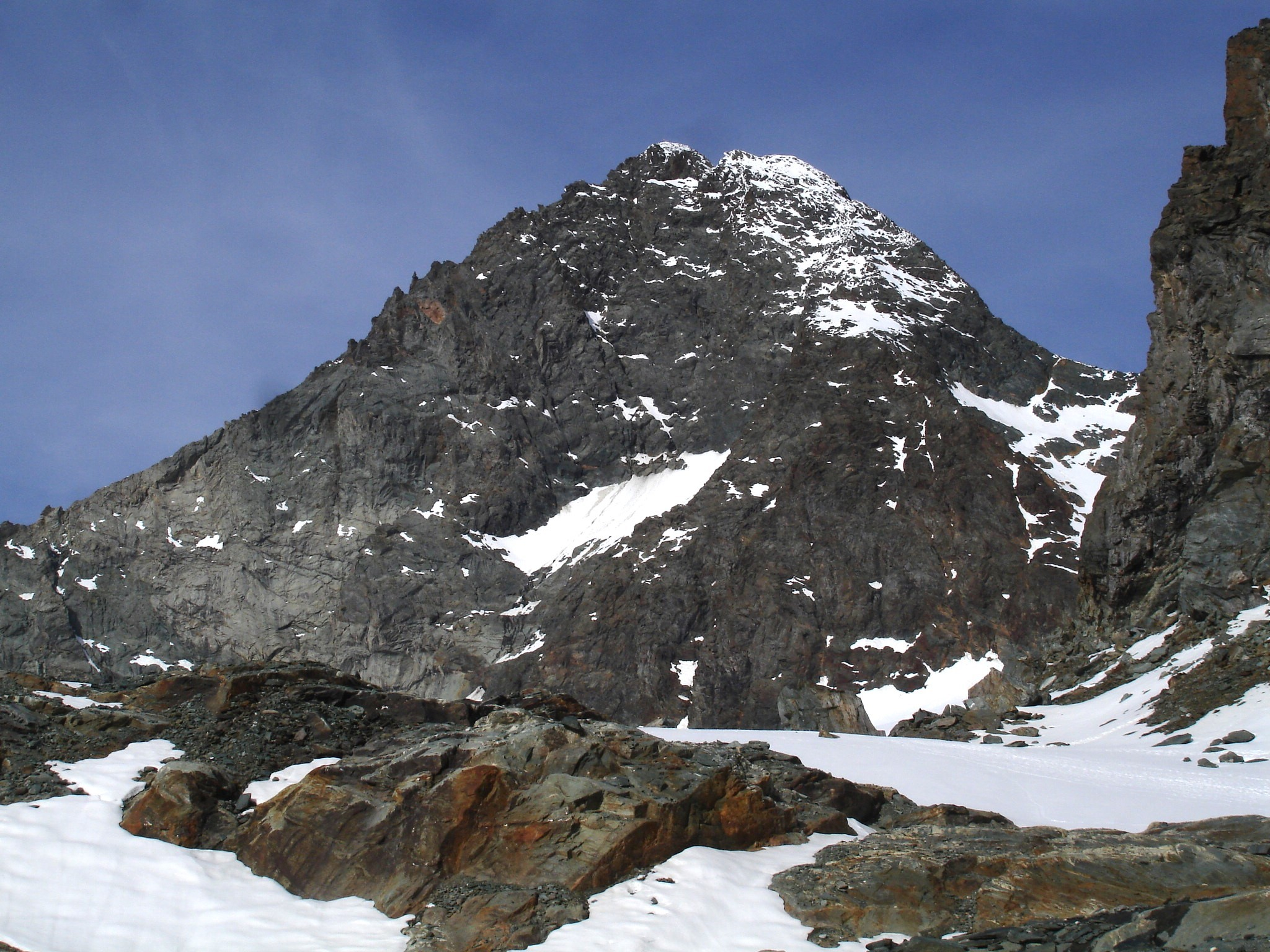
Grossglockner with the Stüdlgrat approach shown on the left

Starting in December 2024, Plamberger and Gurtner made plans to summit the Grossglockner in the Central Eastern Alps. Plamberger had made the ascent "fourteen or fifteen times," according to his later recollections. Gurtner would be summiting Grossglockner for the first time, and was less experienced with alpinism in general. The two planned to complete the summit in a single day, reaching the summit after dark at 9 pm local time. By comparison, officially recommended plan for those summiting Grossglockner for the first time was to hire a guide and split the trip over two days, with a rest in the intervening night at a mountain hut for acclimation.

The couple also planned to take an alternative route to the top, known as the Stüdlgrat route, which in comparison to the normal route had difficult sections of technical climbing. The Stüdlgrat route featured a gear system of permanently fixed belays meant to assist in the use of the route, but as Gurtner and Plamberger were making the ascent in winter, most of these fixtures had been covered by snow and ice.

Plamberger and Gurtner packed light for the trip – Plamberger testified that their only packed food was gummy bears and that they had little emergency equipment. Gurtner had an emergency bivouac bag in her pack, but Plamberger did not. Gurtner also did not have her own pair of crampons, having borrowed a pair from Plamberger which did not fit her, and was using a splitboard rather than dedicated skis for the ascent, which made the skiing sections of the climb more difficult.

=== Attempted ascent of Grossglockner ===
==== Beginning of ascent (6:45 am — 5:00 pm) ====
At 6:45 am local time on 18 January 2025, Plamberger and Gurtner left the parking lot at the base of Grossglockner to begin their ascent, approximately two hours later than the recommended time for beginning an ascent of the Grossglockner. The first section of the climb is a 11-kilometre (7 mi) hike to an acclimatization warming hut, referred to as the Stüdlhütte. Along this first section of the ascent, the couple met and chatted with another climber, who noted that Gurtner was lagging behind and that Plamberger was "keeping a close eye on her". By 10 am, the couple had reached and departed the Stüdlhütte warming hut.

Around 3 pm local time, Plamberger and Gurtner reached a landmark on the Stüdlgrat route known as the "Breakfast Place", which has a large yellow sign installed by local authorities, reading:

If it took you more than 3 hours to get here, turn back! Your life depends on it.

The three-hour window refers to the time since leaving the Stüdlhütte. It had taken Plamberger and Gurtner approximately five hours to complete the section. During later court testimony, Plamberger attributed the delay to the couple's heavy backpacks and to issues with a stuck rope. Despite the warning, Plamberger and Gurtner continued on the ascent.

==== Sun sets and weather worsens (5:00 pm — 10:30 pm) ====
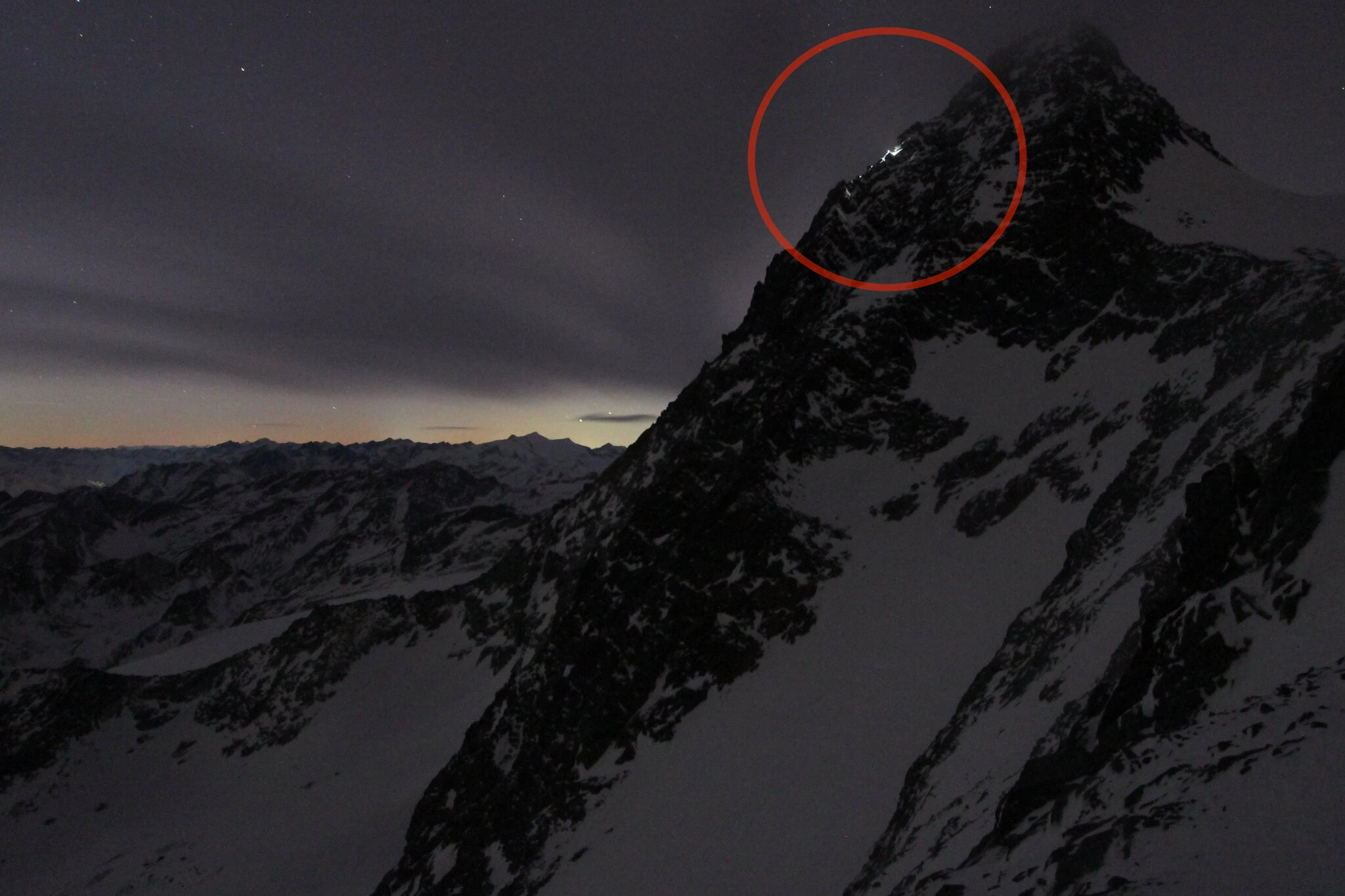
Gurtner and Plamberger's headlamps visible on the mountainside after darkness had set in

As the sun began to set around 5 pm, Gurtner and Plamberger were still relatively low on the Stüdlgrat. At 5:22 pm, Gurtner made a call to the number "149" on her cell phone. Because the number for emergency services in the Alps is "140", and 9 and 0 are close to each other on phone keyboards, it was speculated during Plamberger's trial to mean Gurtner had attempted to call for help. Plamberger said in court that he had not known about the attempted call. Around an hour later, at 6:07 pm, Gurtner texted her mother "we're down."

Around 6:10 pm, it became completely dark and the light from Plamberger and Gurtner's headlamps became visible on live feed webcams pointed at the mountainside, placing them hundreds of feet from the summit. They continued making a slow ascent, during which time Gurtner was injured when she suffered a pendulum fall. According to court proceedings, Gurtner suffered some combination of injuries to her hand, hip and ribs during this time period.

In addition to the darkness, the weather began to dramatically worsen, as a storm began to gather around the mountain. Winds gusted to approximately 74 kilometres per hour (46 mph) and the air temperature had fallen to −8 °C (18 °F), meaning wind chill index had fallen to −20 °C (−4 °F). Around 8 pm, for unknown reasons, Plamberger and Gurtner's headlamps stopped moving.

==== Initial rescue attempts (10:30 pm — 1:30 am) ====
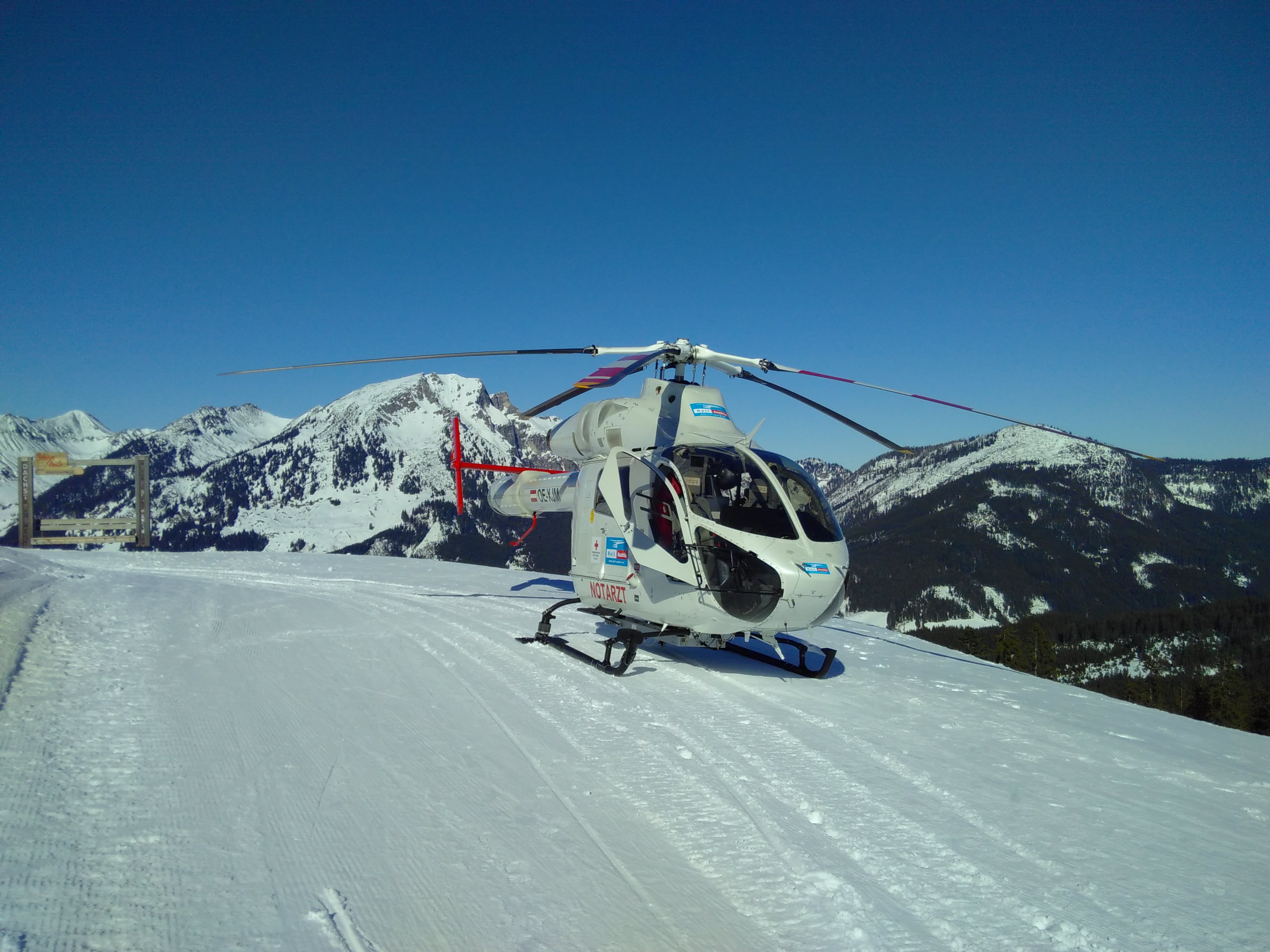
An Austrian alpine rescue helicopter, similar to the one sent to help Gurtner and Plamberger

Hours after darkness fell, another climber descending the mountain saw Gurtner and Plamberger's headlamps. He attempted to shout to communicate with the two climbers, but received no response. With conditions worsening, the climber called the Alpine Police, who assigned an officer identified by the court as Mathias A to the case. Mathias dispatched a rescue helicopter out of Salzburg to search for and rescue the climbers. The helicopter reached the couple at 10:40.

The helicopter made multiple passes, watching for Plamberger or Gurtner to make a distress hand signal, or to make an "X" shape with their arms to indicate they did not require help. However, neither Plamberger nor Gurtner acknowledged the rescue helicopter, with neither of the climbers even looking up at the helicopter hovering above them. Rather, soon after the helicopter arrived, the couple began moving again, heading towards the summit. According to Plamberger, Gurtner denied to him that she had called the rescue helicopter. After six passes, the helicopter abandoned the rescue attempt.

According to an attorney for Plamberger, after the helicopter left, Gurtner "suddenly showed increasing signs of exhaustion". According to the judge's notes on the case, during this period Gurtner could only move by crawling on all fours, an account which Plamberger declined to confirm or deny in court. In video taken from the helicopter, a five minute period is shown in which Gurtner appears to only be able to make 20 centimeters of progress over a five minute period in manageable terrain.

At 12:35 am, Plamberger called Mathias. Mathias had attempted to contact Plamberger via text message after identifying Plamberger as one of the mountaineers on Grossglockner due to his car being the only one remaining in the mountain's parking lot, and by correlating this with his climbing permit. Mathias asked Plamberger why he had not acknowledged the rescue helicopter, Plamberger responded that everything was fine. Mathias pressed to know whether they needed rescue now, which Plamberger insisted they did not. Plamberger maintained in statements that the purpose of the 12:35 call was to request a rescue for Gurtner. In court, Mathias would testify that it was "definitely not an emergency call." Mathias would continue messaging Plamberger to see if he needed help, but Plamberger did not respond, later testifying that he had put his phone on silent to save battery.

==== Plamberger leaves Gurtner (1:30 am — 3:30 am) ====
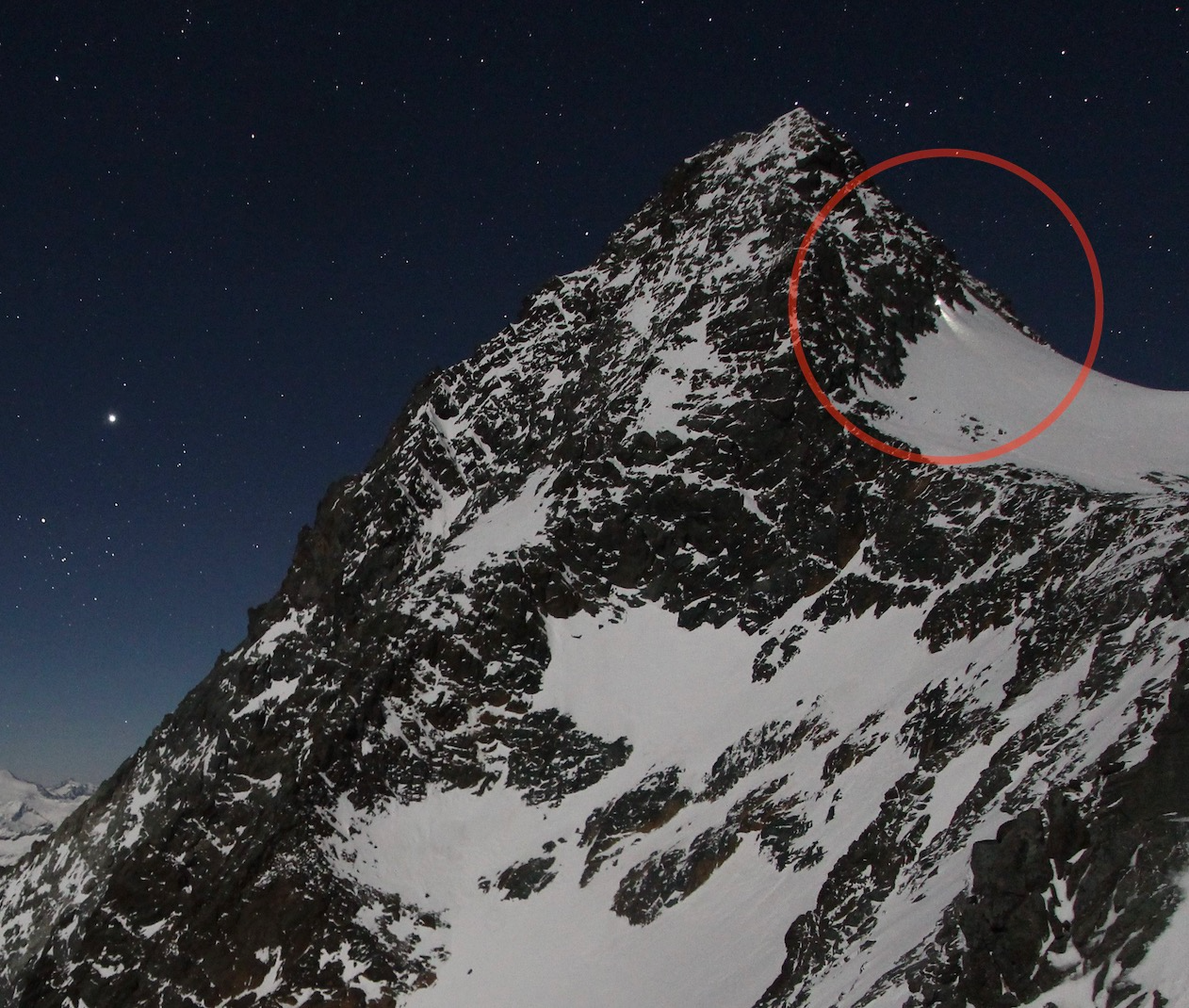
Plamberger's light captured by a webcam descending the "normal route" side of the Grossglockner at 3:00 am

It is unclear exactly when or why Plamberger left Gurtner. According to Plamberger, at around 2 am, he left Gurtner behind to go look for help. On mountain cams, headlights reappeared around 1:30 am, on the opposite side of the mountain, where he began descending via the less difficult normal route. By 3 am, Plamberger was seen on mountain webcams moving quickly down the slope, possibly by skis.

According to Plamberger, he left Gurtner at her insistence after her condition worsened to the point that she became unable to move. He said that after securing her, he tried to lie down next to her to help provide warmth, but she yelled at him to go and find help. Before he left, Plamberger did not attempt use any of the cold weather equipment in Gurtner's pack – including a bivouac bag, a rescue blanket and hand warmers – to warm Gurtner or shelter her from the weather. He later testified that he had forgotten the emergency equipment was available due to the high-stress situation.

Shortly after 3 am, Plamberger reached a different warming hut, known as the Archduke Johann Hut, and phoned Mathias again. Mathias testified that during the first part of the call, it seemed like everything was fine, "But then he told me that he left his girlfriend on the Glockner." Mathias asked Plamberger to return to Gurtner's last position, but Plamberger declined to do so, saying he needed to rest.

==== Recovery of Gurtner's body (3:30 am — 10:00 am) ====
She was not curled in a ball against the wind, as one might expect. She was braced against a near-vertical gray rock on a steep part of the mountain, with her back unnaturally arched and her face pointed at the sky, eyes open. Her feet dangled, her boots untied. There was certainly no room to lie down beside her there. Her gloves were gone. Her heavy pack was still on her back. She was a vision of agony.

— William Finnegan, describing the photos of Gurtner's body shown during Plamberger's trial

Mathias immediately began assembling a team to rescue Gurtner. With the weather continuing to worsen, the rescue helicopter was only able to drop a rescue team approximately 600 metres (2,000 ft) down the mountain, far from Gurtner's position just below the summit. They continued on foot to Gurtner's last known position, which Plamberger had told them was in a gently sloped snowy field where she had been secured with a line of sight to the summit cross. Due to the conditions and distance of the ascent, rescuers only reached Gurtner at 10 am, and found that she had died.

Gurtner's body was not where Plamberger had said he had left her, she was instead tied to a near-vertical rock along the final pitch of the route, roughly 50 meters (160 ft) below the summit. She was facing upward with her boots untied and her gloves missing. Rescuers noted she was found near bloodstains, and was not in a position that would indicate she had fallen down the slope. The judge in Plamberger's trial speculated that her position may indicate that she had been able to move before she died, while an analysis from Climbing suggested that Plamberger had simply lied about where she had been left.

As the recovery was ongoing, Plamberger was flown off the mountain by helicopter and interrogated by Lienz police, who described him as "taciturn" but able to answer questions clearly.

=== Aftermath ===
Investigators were unable to locate Plamberger's GoPro camera, which he had been wearing during the ascent. An official autopsy would find that Gurtner had died from hypothermia.

In December 2025, Austrian authorities announced they had filed charges against Plamberger for gross negligent homicide.

In February 2026, two weeks before the trial was to begin, Kerstin Gurtner's parents spoke to German newspaper Die Zeit to say that they did not believe Plamberger was guilty for Kerstin's death.

== Trial of Thomas Plamberger ==
Plamberger's trial took place over a single day on 19 February 2026 at the Innsbruck Regional Court, presided over by Judge Norbert Hofer. Due to the nature of the case in Austrian law, the case was presided over by a single judge rather than a jury. Judge Hofer was noted as being an experienced climber himself, having worked as an alpine rescuer and published articles about liability in the alpine. For the charges, Plamberger faced a maximum sentence of three years imprisonment.

=== Arguments ===
The prosecution's argument rested on the Germanic legal concept of Garantenstellung, an implicit duty of care in a range of situations, such as a parent's duty to protect a child or a driver's responsibility to help a pedestrian they hit. The prosecution argued that given Plamberger's experience in mountaineering, and Gurtner's relative lack of experience, that he had a duty to help her. The charges were based on nine errors which the prosecution said led to Gurtner's death:

1. Taking Gurtner on the climb while she lacked the proper experience
2. Starting the ascent two hours later than recommended
3. Not carrying a bivouac bag
4. Allowing Gurtner to make the ascent with a splitboard and soft snowboarding boots
5. Failing to turn back in the face of wind speeds of 74 kilometres per hour (46 mph)
6. Not placing an emergency call before nightfall
7. Not signalling the helicopter for rescue
8. Failing to respond to alpine police messages after the 12:35am phone call
9. Not protecting Gurtner from the winds or cold before he left her, or removing her backpack or splitboard

A tenth error was added to the charges after the first nine but before the trial took place, faulting Plamberger for using a fixed belay instead of a running belay.

Plamberger's defense argued that he and Gurtner were equal partners and equally responsible for decision making. They argued that Plamberger was himself inexperienced and lacking in formal training, and as someone who therefore did not have the ability or inherent responsibility to protect Gurtner.

=== Testimony ===
Fifteen witnesses took the stand over the course of Plamberger's trial, including experts, police officers and rescuers, as well as associates of both Plamberger and Gurtner. Plamberger also testified on his own behalf.

==== Plamberger ====
Plamberger testified in his own defense, saying that he had left Gurtner to get help. He was unable to explain why she was not where he had told rescuers he had left her. He testified that Gurtner's collapse into exhaustion occurred around midnight, and happened suddenly and without warning. He said that his 12:35 call to Mathias was to request help, and that after the call ended, Gurtner became unable to continue moving.

Coverage noted contradictions at several points in Plamberger's testimony: at one point, he said that his 12:35 call was to request help, but later on, he would say that during the 12:35 call he was unaware that Gurtner needed assistance. He also maintained that he had secured Gurtner in a flat area and had tried to lie down next to her, something which contradicted how Gurtner had been found, in a vertical area where lying down next to her would not have been possible.

==== Alpine police and rescuers ====
Several alpine police officers and rescuers testified during the trial, including Mathias A. Mathias A testified that Plamberger had insisted everything was fine during the 12:35 call, and that he had tried to no avail to contact Plamberger again to see if a rescue operation was needed. The officer who questioned Plamberger the morning that Gurtner died said he had made clear during their interview that he had been acting as a de-facto guide.

==== Andrea Bergner ====
The final witness to take the stand was Andrea Bergner, a social media fitness influencer and Plamberger's ex-girlfriend, described as a "surprise witness". She described an incident that had occurred while she was dating Plamberger, which also took place on the Grossglockner. In 2023, the couple planned an overnight summer ascent of the peak but had argued on the way down. Bergner testified that Plamberger felt she was moving too slow for him, and had left her behind, saying, "Suddenly he was gone... It was the middle of the night, I was completely alone, my headlamp went out, I was dizzy, I was yelling and screaming. I was all alone; he had gone ahead." She said that she and Plamberger remained together after this incident, breaking up later for different reasons, but that was the last time they went hiking together.

=== Verdict and sentencing ===
Judge Hofer found Plamberger guilty of the charge of gross negligent homicide. He described a number of mitigating factors in Plamberger's defense, including rejecting several of the items listed by the prosecution as non-fatal mistakes. He faulted Plamberger instead for failing to recognize Gurtner's skill in comparison to his own, failing to recognize her exhaustion, not bringing proper emergency equipment and for failing to turn back when warned to do so at the Breakfast Place. As Gurtner would have survived if not for these choices, Hofer rendered a charge of guilty.

In sentencing, Hofer considered the mitigating factors as well as the fact that it was Plamberger's first offense. The judge also considered the fact that in Gurtner's death, Plamberger had lost a loved one. The judge also did not consider Bergner's testimony, as it was not considered to have a direct impact on what happened to Gurtner. Judge Hofer handed down to Plamberger a sentence of five months suspended prison sentence, and a €9600 fine. The sentence was noted by observers as a lenient sentence for the charges.

=== Appeal ===
On 24 February 2026, Plamberger filed for a full appeal of his case and sentencing. The prosecution also filed an appeal of sentencing.

== Reactions ==
The case sparked significant debate in the climbing community about the legal responsibility of climbers to protect one another. Peter Beaumont, writing in The Guardian, said that Plamberger's conviction could alter climbing in Europe, and cause people to be hesitant to help others get into the hobby for fear of criminal charges in an accident.

In a public television documentary on the case, Austrian mountaineer Peter Habeler said of Plamberger leaving Gurtner behind, "That's a no-go."

=== Social media ===
The case attracted significant response on social media. In particular, the incident sparked discussion about alpine divorce, a phenomenon of men abandoning their female partners on hikes or climbs. As details emerged about the case, stories began trending on social media sites including TikTok and Instagram from women who had been left behind by their boyfriends on hikes or other outdoors activities.
