= Edge of the Earth (miniseries) =

HBO Max documentary miniseries "Edge of the Earth" (2022)

- Genre: Documentary
- Created by: Steve Jones; Todd Jones; Drew Holt
- Directed by: Todd Jones; Steve Jones
- Composer: Tyler Strickland
- Country of origin: United States
- Original language: English
- No. of seasons: 1
- No. of episodes: 4

Production
- Executive producers: Steve Jones; Todd Jones; Drew Holt; Brett Hills
- Producer: Drew Holt
- Cinematography: Michael Ozier; Jeff Wright; Ben Danin
- Editors: Justin Fann; Rose Corr
- Running time: 60 minutes
- Production companies: HBO; Teton Gravity Research

Original release
- Network: HBO
- Release: July 12 – August 2, 2022

Edge of the Earth is a 2022 HBO documentary television miniseries that follows four different extreme sports expeditions undertaken by elite athletes. Each episode follows a different group traveling to a remote area. The outdoor sports highlighted are snowboarding, kayaking, rock climbing, and surfing. Everywhere the athletes go, they witness the impact of climate change and industry on the landscape and society. The series was filmed during the COVID-19 pandemic.

== Production ==
The series was created and directed by brothers Todd Jones and Steve Jones, founders of production company Teton Gravity Research (TGR). Talks to develop the series began between TGB and HBO in the summer of 2019. There were early plans to shoot in China, but this did not occur due to the outbreak of the COVID-19 pandemic. The show was filmed during the pandemic and, as a result, the athletes and filmmaking crew underwent regular testing. The pandemic also led to logistical challenges as the team navigated areas with travel bans. The production team consisted of more than 60 people in total. In each location, cinematography was handled by experts in their respective sports.

== Cast ==
- Elena Hight
- Jeremy Jones
- Griffin Post
- Nouria Newman
- Ben Stookesberry
- Erik Boomer
- Emily Harrington
- Adrian Ballinger
- Grant Baker
- Ian Walsh

== Episodes ==
No.	Title	Directed by	Original release date
1	"Into the Void"	Todd Jones & Steve Jones	July 12, 2022
Jeremy Jones leads a group of fellow elite snowboarders in an attempt to descend Mount Bertha in Alaska's Glacier Bay National Park and Preserve, as the mountain has never been snowboarded or skied. The group hikes up to their destination, encountering both heavy snows and unseasonably warm weather. Jones talks about his non-profit organization Protect Our Winters, which is fighting for government action against climate change.
2	"Raging Torrent"	Todd Jones & Steve Jones	July 19, 2022
In Ecuador, a trio of whitewater kayakers aim to be the first ones to cross Llanganates National Park via the Chalupas River. They encounter more challenging conditions than expected, face low food rations, and an injury from a machete accident. The group fights over whether to continue and how to better communicate so they can proceed safely. In the end, they must call off the trip.
3	"Reaching for the Sky"	Todd Jones & Steve Jones	July 26, 2022
Climbing team and romantic couple Emily Harrington and Adrian Ballinger travel to the incredibly remote Pik Slesova in Kyrgyzstan. Their goal is to accomplish the first individual free climb ascent up a challenging route. Their original plan is to hike to the mountain. However, both contract COVID-19 despite being vaccinated and taking precautions. After two weeks of quarantine in an hotel, they test negative for the virus. The couple fly by helicopter to the mountain and begin their ascent. After several grueling days, they summit and are elated.
4	"The Great Unknown"	Todd Jones & Steve Jones	August 2, 2022
Grant Baker is among a group of elite surfers who go in search of new beaches with the potential for massive swells on the western coast of South Africa. During the expedition, they struggle to find good waves, and thoroughly plan out safety protocols for surfing in the unfamiliar areas. An Australian mining company threatens to destroy around 50 kilometers of pristine, untouched shoreline, and activists struggle to save the area.

== Reception ==
Scott Hines of Decider praised the show, writing it avoided "being corny" by making "something that’s simultaneously breathtakingly beautiful and utterly terrifying." Michelle Bruton at Forbes felt the show did a good job appealing to both those involved in action sports and those where were more casually interested. Graham Averill at Outside likened the extreme sports as "almost a sideshow" and wrote "The films are at their most compelling when they focus on the human element of the expeditions."
