= Etnies =

Skateboarding footwear and apparel brand

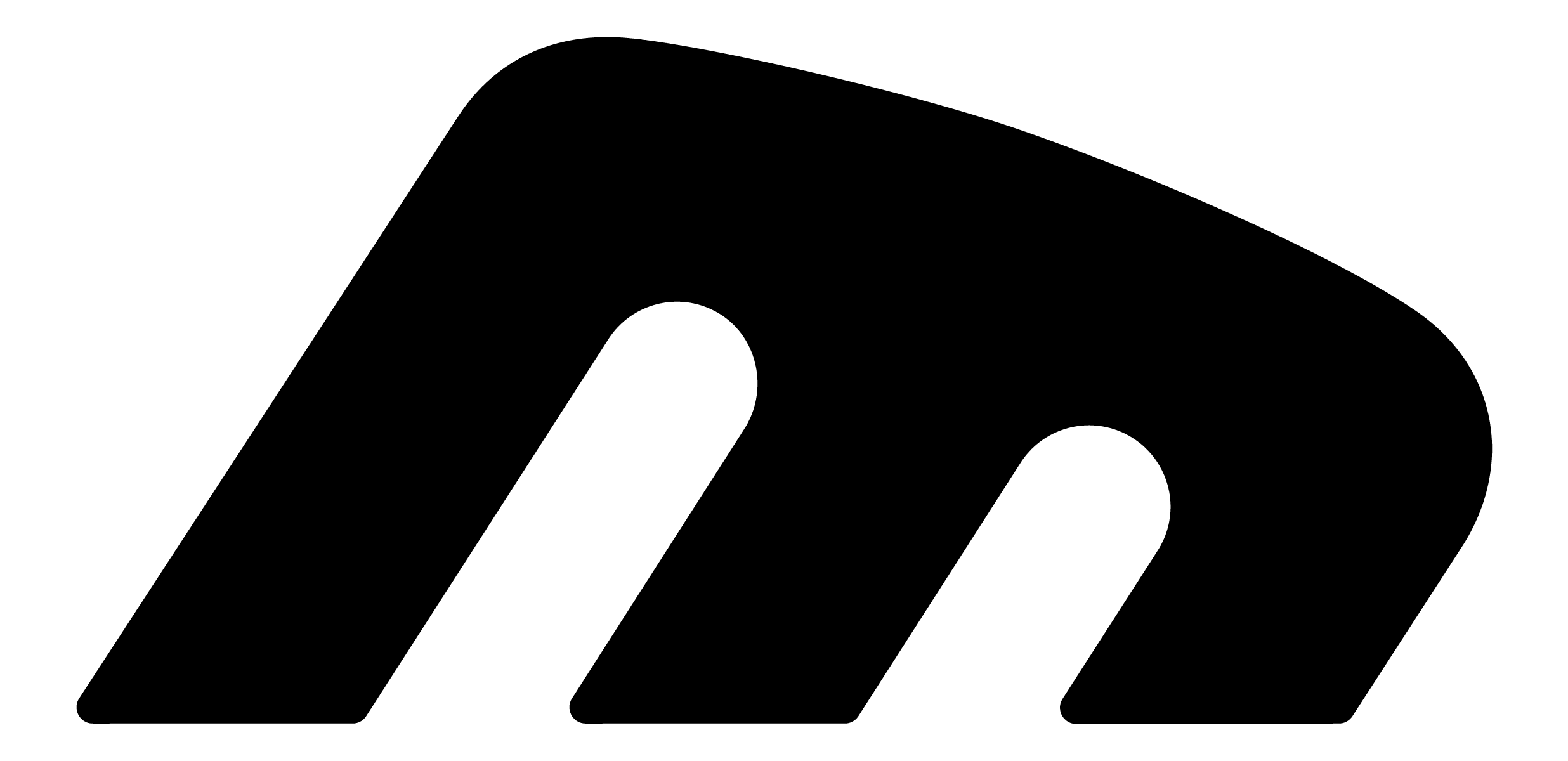
- Type: Private
- Industry: Skateboarding footwear; Apparel
- Founded: 1986; 40 years ago
- Headquarters: Lake Forest, California, U.S.
- Key people: Pierre-André Senizergues
- Products: Skate shoes, apparel
- Parent: Nidecker Group
- Website: www.etnies.com

Etnies (stylized as etnies) is a skateboarding footwear and apparel brand founded in 1986 and owned by Nidecker Group. The brand was founded in France and later developed in Southern California; it sponsors professional skateboarders and BMX riders and releases signature shoe models.

== History ==
The company was launched in 1986 and following the end of his professional skateboarding career, Pierre André Sénizergues, commenced design work at etnies shortly after the company's formation. etnies was an emerging European brand at the time that Sénizergues joined the company and he was responsible for designing the "Senix", "Lo-Cut", "Low-Top Rap", "Intercity", and "Scam" shoe models. Sénizergues subsequently introduced the brand to the United States and proceeded to build Sole Technology, with the addition of the Emerica, éS, and ThirtyTwo (snowboarding brand created in 1995) brands.

== Skate park ==
In 2003, etnies and the city of Lake Forest, California, opened etnies Skatepark of Lake Forest, the largest public skatepark in the state, at over 40,000 square feet (3,700 m^{2}). The park has been used for a Sole Technology-sponsored skateboard competition, entitled "Goofy vs. Regular (GvR)"; goofy-footed skateboarders competed against regular-footed skateboarders, that was held in 2007 and 2008.

== Filmography ==
Skateboard

- 2007: Restless
- 2018: Album

BMX

- 2002: Forward
- 2007: Grounded
- 2017: Chapters

== Sponsorships ==
=== Current skate team ===
- Andy Anderson
- Trevor McClung
- Nick Garcia
- Barney Page
- Nassim Lachhab
- Julian Lewis
- Noah Francisco

=== Former skate team ===
- Ryan Sheckler
- Chris Joslin
- Jake Wooten
- Aurélien Giraud
- Rune Glifberg
- Sean Malto
- Mikey Taylor
- Jason Dill
- Ali Boulala
- Arto Saari
- Elissa Steamer
- Willow
- Ryan Lay
- David Reyes
- Jamie Tancowny
- Matt Berger
- Samarria Brevard
- Tyler Bledsoe
- Nick Fiorini
- Kyle Leeper
- Jose Rojo
- Bastien Salabanzi
- Lincoln Ueda
- Chris Lambert
- Rob Gonzalez
- Mike Vallely
- Carlos de Andrade
- Fabrizio Santos
- Fabiana Delfino

=== Current BMX team ===
- Nathan Williams
- Chase Hawk
- Aaron Ross
- Ben Lewis
- Tom Dugan
- Devon Smilie
- Reed Stark
- Jordan Godwin
- Jordan Okane
