= Alpine divorce =

Term for abandoning partners while hiking

Alpine divorce is a neologism describing situations where an individual was abandoned by their romantic partner during hiking, climbing or mountaineering, mainly due to an argument. The term gained attention online in 2026 following the death of Kerstin Gurtner.

== Definition ==
In general, "Alpine divorce" refers to incidents where during hiking, tracking or mountaineering, one of the partners leaves the other behind who is unwilling or unable to continue. When used online the term can relate to one of these situations:

- One partner leaves the other intentionally because of an argument.
- The faster or more experienced hiker leaves the slower one behind.
- An extreme trip turns into a symbolic breakup between romantic partners.

This is not a formal legal term nor a mountaineering concept.

== Origins and popularization ==
The origin of the term is in an 1893 short story by Scottish Canadian writer Robert Barr about an unhappy married couple that spends a weekend in the Alps. The husband plans to push his wife off the summit, but she tells him she has framed him for murder. She then jumps off the edge just as the police arrive.

The term became popular during the mid-2020s as viral videos and posts on social media described people being abandoned during hiking or climbing trips by their partners. The main theme of the stories was usually disagreement about pace, route directions, or whether to continue with the trip or climb. As the stories gained attention, online discussions started focusing or framing these experiences as cases of conflicts in relationships that came to life under extreme physical outdoor conditions.

== Safety concerns ==
Outdoor recreation organizations raised attention to the fact that under no circumstances should a hiker or climbers leave the main group in a hazardous area. An event where someone leaves their partner without suitable navigation tools, clothing or knowledge about the route increases the danger and risk of hypothermia or getting lost. In many cases it is recommended that such groups adjust their pace to the slowest participant.

== Notable incidents ==
=== Austria ===
In 2026, Thomas Plamberger, a climber in Austria, was convicted of manslaughter after he left his girlfriend, Kerstin Gurtner, near the summit of the Grossglockner, where she died from hypothermia.

=== Hawaii ===
In March 2025, while on a joint hike in Hawaii intended to repair their marriage, Arielle Konig was attacked by her husband, Dr. Gerhardt Konig, who attempted to kill her. He was convicted of attempted manslaughter in April 2026.

=== Global ===
Rescue teams worldwide reported several cases where hikers abandoned their partners because they were "too slow".

== Cultural impact ==
The term "Alpine divorce" became widely used in online discussions about relationships and recreation. Commentators often use the phrase in a humorous way to describe tensions in relationships, arising due to physically and challenging activities such as hiking or mountaineering. Psychologists and relationship commentators used these discussions to show that unfamiliar, stressful environments can reveal incompatibility between partners.
