= Backcountry =

Remote geographical area

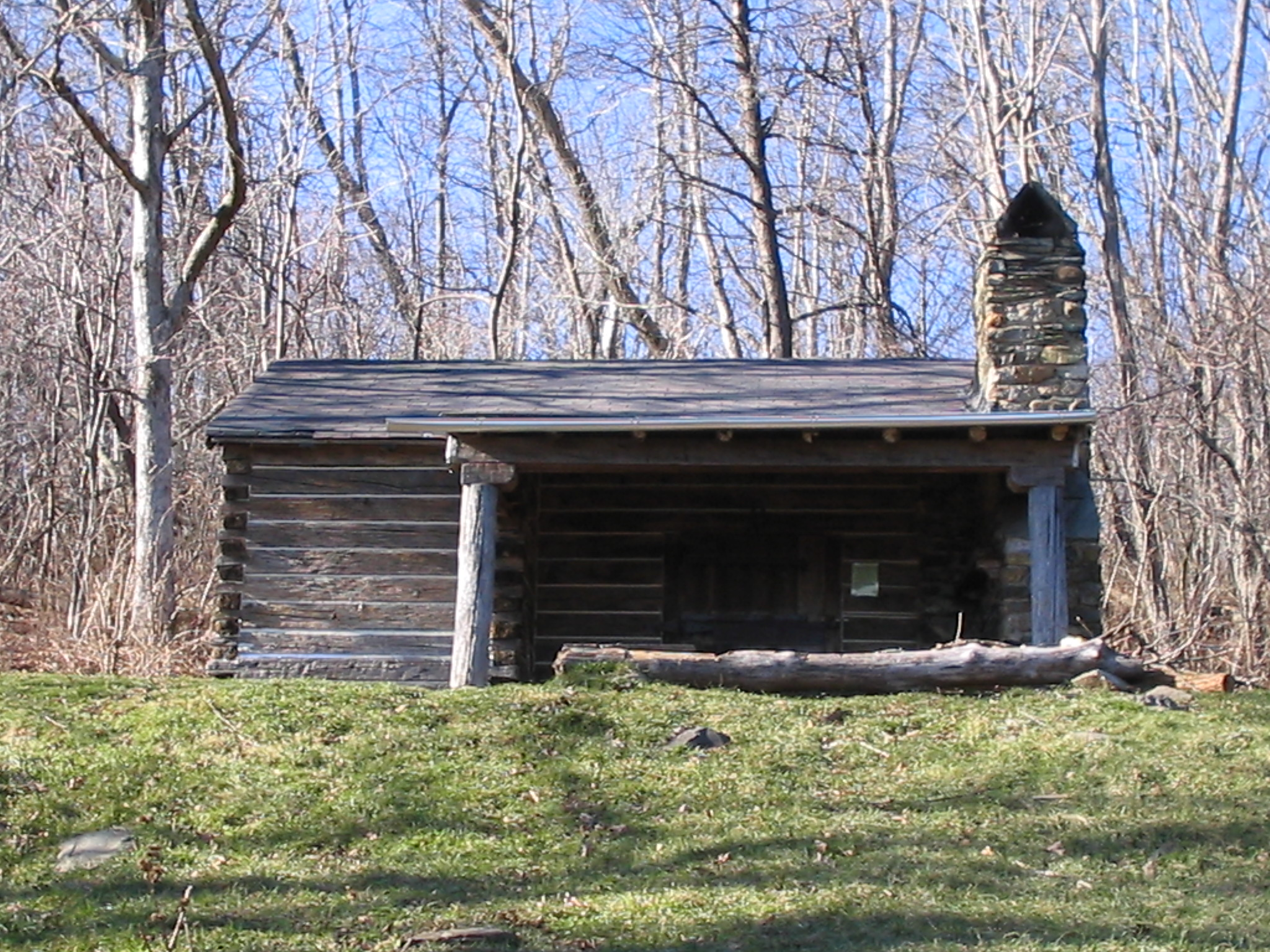
The Pocosin cabin along the Appalachian Trail in Shenandoah National Park.

In geography, a backcountry, back country or backwater is a geographical area that is remote, undeveloped, isolated, or difficult to access. These areas are typically rural or mountainous and sparsely populated.

== Terminology ==
=== Backcountry and wilderness within United States national parks ===
The National Park Service (NPS) generally uses the term "backcountry" to refer to "primitive, undeveloped portions of parks". Developments within backcountry areas are generally limited to trails, unpaved roads, and administrative facilities associated with dispersed recreational use. Dispersed recreational use is the most prevalent human use in backcountry areas, although research activities may also occur.

The NPS defines wilderness within US national parks as any "backcountry areas which have been specifically designated as part of the National Wilderness Preservation System or any other area that has been determined to possess the characteristics of wilderness as defined by Section 2(c) of the Wilderness Act". Section 2(c) states in part that wilderness:

(1) generally appears to have been affected primarily by the forces of nature, with the imprint of man's work substantially unnoticeable; (2) has outstanding opportunities for solitude or a primitive and unconfined type of recreation; (3) has at least five thousand acres of land or is of sufficient size as to make practicable its preservation and use in an unimpaired condition; and (4) may also contain ecological, geological, or other features of scientific, educational, scenic, or historical value.

Wilderness lands within US national parks are a subset of all backcountry lands. Wilderness and backcountry lands also exist outside of US national parks on public lands managed by the US Forest Service, the Bureau of Land Management, and the US Fish and Wildlife Service.

=== Use of the term "backcountry" in New Zealand and Australia ===
In New Zealand, "backcountry" often refers to land that is not accessible by public access. For example, it is common for a farmer to have some remote parts of their land left in scrubland or forest. This is often adjacent to other areas of backcountry which are yet to be developed or protected from development. Trampers and other explorers sometimes need to get farmers' permission to access parts of the national parks of New Zealand or other natural phenomena, if they intend to pass over backcountry. Hunters can ask for permission from farmers to hunt in their backcountry.

==== Backcountry in Australia ====
Backcountry is generally only used for mountainous areas where snow falls in Australia, whereas other remote areas are usually called "the bush" which can cover both national park areas and farming areas.

== Hazards ==
The backcountry may contain many hazards including rough terrain, life-threatening weather, avalanches, and wild animals. In the United States, tragic accidents and dramatic backcountry rescues of stranded hikers, climbers, or skiers are a staple of news reporting.

Some United States jurisdictions have discussed placing limits on human access to the backcountry during times of particular danger.

== See also ==
- Backcountry skiing
- Backcountry snowboarding
- Backcountry.com
- Backcountry hut
- Badlands
- Bushland
- Countryside
- Desert
- Outback
- The bush
- Potability of backcountry water
- Wilderness
- Frontcountry
- Slackcountry
