= David Carrier Porcheron =

Canadian snowboarder

David Carrier Porcheron, also known by his siglum DCP, is a professional snowboarder from Quebec, Canada. He is the co-owner of YES. Snowboards.

Porcheron has been sponsored by Northwave/Drake and The North Face. He rode for Burton Snowboards for 14 years before being dropped from the team. He then started YES. with Romain de Marchi, JP Solberg and Tadashi Fuse.

Porcheron is married to former pro snowboarder Megan Pischke. They have a daughter and a son.
