= Jeremy Jones (freestyler) =

American snowboarder (born 1975)

- Born: Jeremy Jones; January 2, 1975 (age 51); San Carlos, California, U.S.
- Occupation: Snowboarder
- Known for: Freestyle snowboarding and jibbing

Jeremy Jones (born January 2, 1975) is an American professional snowboarder. He is known for freestyle snowboarding and jibbing.

== Snowboarding career ==
Jeremy began snowboarding when he was 13 years old. Jeremy is unique because he sets a standard for snowboarding but he does not compete. He was sponsored by, Burton, Anon, Milosport, and Nixon. Jeremy was selected by Peter Line to join Forum Snowboarding, where he became part of the original eight snowboarders of the Forum team. While at Forum he continued to revolutionize freestyle snowboarding. At Northstar resort in California, a fellow freestyle snowboarder conquered a large "down-flat-down" rail that eluded Jeremy Jones throughout his entire career. In 2015, Jones earned the bronze medal in the Real Snow competition, an all-urban, all-video snowboard contest presented by the World of X Games.

Jones is sometimes confused with Jeremy Jones, a fellow professional snowboarder born just over a year earlier in January 1975. While both share the same name and prominence in snowboarding, the freestyler Jeremy Jones is recognized for his urban and rail-focused riding and grew up in Salt Lake City, Utah, whereas the freerider Jeremy Jones is known for big mountain exploration and hails from Cape Cod, Massachusetts.

== Physical stats ==
Jeremy Jones is 5 ft 8 in (1.73 m) tall, weighs 150 lbs (68 kg) and wears a US 8 boot. He rides goofy, 15 degrees in the front and negative nine degrees in the back. Jones also stands 24.5" wide.

== Movie career ==
His snowboard movies include Chulcksmack, Decade, Follow Me Around, 91 Words for Snow, From___ With Love, Jibbing with Jeremy Jones, Nixon Jib Fest, Pulse, Shakedown, Technical Difficulties, The Resistance, True Life, Picture This, Its Always Snowing Somewhere, Double Decade, The "B" Movie, and 13. Mack Dawg Movies made him famous worldwide around snowboard fans.

== Major injury ==
On Wednesday January 11, 2017, he had a snowboarding accident in the Utah backcountry. As a result, he suffered multiple broken bones in both of his legs. The accident occurred during a filming session in Little Cottonwood Canyon and was described by fellow snowboarder Seth Huot as a "traumatic event" after Jones was buried in snow and had to be rescued. In an interview on The Bomb Hole podcast, Jones spoke in detail about the incident, his extensive recovery, and how he had to relearn basic tricks and rebuild confidence to return to snowboarding.
