= Ellery Hollingsworth =

American snowboarder (born 1991)

Ellery Breck Hollingsworth (born September 2, 1991) is an American professional snowboarder from Stratton, Vermont.

== Biography ==
Ellery started snowboarding when she was 6 years old. Ellery is from Darien, CT and a graduate of the Stratton Mountain School where she trained to be a professional snowboarder, and is currently one of the youngest snowboarders competing in international snowboard competitions. Recently, she's made it onto a series of podiums at major events, including a third-place finish at the Tamarack stop of the US Snowboarding Grand Prix, and a third-place finish at the 2007 Burton New Zealand Open Slopestyle event. In September 2009, she was named to the US Snowboarding team and is competing in the US Snowboarding Grand Prix events in order to gain a spot on the 2010 US Winter Olympics team. She is an all-around athlete who surfs, skateboards and golfs. She plays soccer, tennis, yoga and runs. Sports are a large part of her life as she is constantly active. Ellery is focused on being a progressive female snowboarder, pushing the level of the sport and evolving her riding skills and performance.

She is sponsored by Burton, Nike 6.0, Oakley, and Gatorade. Her official website is www.elleryhollingsworth.com.

== Competition Results ==
The following are Ellery's competition results:

- 10th – 2009 Ticket to Ride (World Snowboard Tour) Season End Rankings
- 3rd – 2009 Aspen Snow Angels, Aspen, CO, Halfpipe
- 3rd – 2009 Burton US Open, Stratton Mountain Resort, Halfpipe
- 4th – 2009 FIS World Cup, La Molina, Spain, Halfpipe
- 4th – 2009 Winter Dew Tour, Lake Tahoe, CA, Superpipe
- 4th – 2009 ESPN Winter X Games, Aspen, CO, Superpipe
- 3rd – 2009 Winter Dew Tour, Mt. Snow, VT, Superpipe
- 10th – 2008 Ticket to Ride (World Snowboard Tour) Season End Rankings
- 4th – 2008 World Superpipe Championships, Park City, UT, Halfpipe
- 2nd – 2008 Chevrolet Grand Prix, Killington, Halfpipe
- 4th – 2007 Grand Prix, Breckenridge, CO, Halfpipe
- 5th – 2007 FIS World Cup, Lake Placid, NY, Halfpipe
- 3rd – 2007 Grand Prix, MT Bachelor, Slopestyle
- 1st – 2007 Honda Session at Vail, Rail Jam
- 3rd – 2007 Burton Global Open Series Year End Standings Combined
- 5th – 2006 Burton New Zealand Open, Superpipe
- 3rd – 2006 Burton New Zealand Open, Slopestyle
- 18th – 2006 TTR World Snowboard Tour Season End Rankings
