= Johan Olofsson (snowboarder) =

Swedish snowboarder

Johan Olofsson (born 27 October 1976) is a snowboarder from Gällivare, Sweden. He is known for being one of the first riders to take freestyle tricks more commonly performed in man-made terrain parks into the big mountain freeriding environments of Alaska. Olofsson originally came from a freestyle background; when he arrived on the Alaskan snowboarding scene, he quickly adapted his spin tricks and jibs to the backcountry environment. Olofsson rapidly gained attention and respect from the freeriding community when he started doing these tricks off natural features such as windlips and cliffs in the midst of terrifyingly steep lines in the Alaskan ranges.

In the Standard Films movie TB5 (his first part in a major snowboard release), he was filmed in Alaska attacking a line with such ferocity that he stunned the snowboarding world and instantly gained legendary status. From the top of the line to foot of the descent, on a slope of over 40 degrees, he travelled over 3000 vertical feet in a mere 35 seconds, averaging over 120 km/h, a feat which got him into the 1996 Guinness Book of World Records and the Snowboarding Hall of Fame. He subsequently became a main stay of the TB series, featuring in TB6, TB7, TB8, TB9, TB10, as well as other movies such as Snowriders 2 (1997) and Freeriders (1998).

Olofsson spent his entire snowboarding career (some eight years) with Burton as his primary sponsor. After a series of injuries between 2001 and 2004 he was dropped by Burton Snowboards and went some years without a sponsor. He announced his retirement from professional snowboarding in 2005 and went on to work on a project building a snowpark at Dundret in Gällivare (Sweden) in 2007, called Thunderpark.

He moved on from Thunderpark, and went pro for The North Face. He features in Teton Gravity Research's 2010 movie Deeper.

Venture Snowboards from Silverton, CO, brought him on board as a product tester to aid product design and development of their boards. He rode one of their Storm-R splitboards during the filming of Deeper. In 2011, Venture released the "Odin" which while not a pro-model, was designed in collaboration with Olofsson and features his signature on the board graphic.
