= YES. Snowboards =

Snowboard manufacturer

YES. Snowboards Inc.
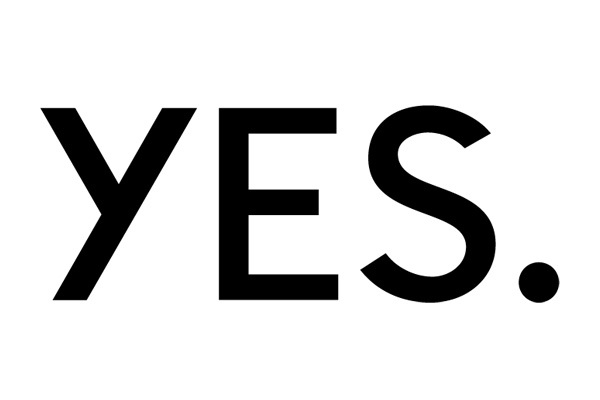
- Type: Private
- Industry: Sporting goods
- Founded: 2009; 17 years ago
- Headquarters: Switzerland
- Key people: Romain De Marchi, JP Solberg, DCP, David Pitschi
- Products: Snowboard equipment, apparel, accessories
- Number of employees: 4
- Website: www.yesnowboard.com

YES. Snowboards is a manufacturer of snowboards. It was founded in 2009 and is based in Europe.

== History ==
The company was founded by UnInc riders DCP (David Carrier-Porcheron), Romain De Marchi and JP Solberg after leaving Burton Snowboards. They created their own brand, and established its name in the industry in a relatively short period of time.

YES. is an independent compagny, which has collaborated with Globe International and other Swiss brands.

== Models ==
All YES. models were manufactured in the GST factory in Austria before gradually moving production to the SWS factory in Dubai starting in 2014. The GST factory closed in 2016. The YES. designers receive R&D input of some top-level freestyle snowboarders. The 2016-17 catalog consists of fourteen models, which grew to twenty for 2019-20. YES. has also collaborated with Now Snowboarding on bindings, and Globe International on shoes.

== Awards ==
- EUROSima's Breakthrough Brand of the Year 2010.
- ISPO Award "Gold Award" for the 20/20 Powderhull, 2015.
