= Jeremy Jones (freerider) =

American professional snowboarder (born 1975)

- Born: January 14, 1975 (age 51); Cape Cod, Massachusetts, U.S.
- Occupations: Snowboarder, Founder and CEO of Jones Snowboards
- Known for: Snowboarding, Snowboard Manufacturing
- Spouse: Tiffany Jones
- Children: 2

Jeremy Jones (born January 14, 1975) is an American professional snowboarder and businessman who is the founder of Jones Snowboards. In addition to creating and improving his line of snowboards, Jones works to create films that record his climbing and snowboarding adventures around the world. In November 2012, Jones was selected by National Geographic as a nominee for Adventurer of the Year, based on his "remarkable achievements in exploration, conservation, humanitarianism, and adventure sports." Jones is also the founder of the non-profit group Protect Our Winters, which works to reduce the effects of global climate change by means of educational, activist and community-based projects. He is sponsored by: O'Neill, POC, CLIF Bar, Scott, Giro, 661 and Blue Bird Wax.

== Early life ==
Jones grew up in various parts of the New England region of the United States, including Massachusetts, Vermont, and Maine. He attended Carrabassett Valley Academy in Carrabassett Valley, Maine and graduated in 1993. He started snowboarding in 1984, he was sponsored by Rossignol in 1989, and he became a professional snowboarder two years later in 1991.

== Career ==
After racing for many years, Jones focused his efforts on big mountain snowboarding, particularly in Alaska. His snowboarding style was a seminal influence on modern freeriding, and today Jones is regarded as a pioneer of professional big mountain riding.

Jones regularly rides with Xavier de Le Rue, Jonas Emery, Mads Jonsson, Victoria Jealouse and Johan Olofsson. The Jones snowboards team consists of Jonaven Moore, Ryland Bell, Forrest Shearer, Miikka Hast and Ralph Backstorm. Jeremy regularly participates in the Swatch O'Neill Big Mountain Pro tour.

In 2007 Jones founded Protect Our Winters (POW), a non-profit organization dedicated to reversing the global warming crisis by uniting the winter sports community and focusing its collective efforts towards reversing the damage done by climate change. As a testament to Jones' commitment to the environment, he has recently decided to forego the use of helicopters and lifts, opting instead to hike as his sole means of transportation on the slopes.

In 2009 Jones left his original snowboard sponsor Rossignol and announced his own line of snowboards tailored for big mountain and backcountry riding, Jones Snowboards. They were available as of the 2013/2014 season and have a significant share of the growing splitboard market.

Jones is occasionally confused with Jeremy Jones (freestyler), a fellow professional snowboarder known for his urban and street-focused riding style.

== Personal life ==
Jones lives in Truckee, California, with his wife, Tiffany, who is a real estate agent in the Lake Tahoe area. He has two children. Daughter Mia is an accomplished snowboarder in her own right.

== Filmography ==
=== Film ===
Year	Title	Notes
1996	TB 6 - Carpe diem	
1996	The Continuum	
1997	Snowriders II	
1997	Harvest	
1998	TB 8 - Infinity	
1998	Uprising	
1999	TB 9 - Totally Board Nine	
1999	The Realm	
2000	TB 10 - Optigrab	
2000	Further	
2001	Best of Totally Board Series	
2001	Mind the Addiction	
2002	The Prophecy	
2003	High Life	
2004	Soul Purpose	
2004	Tangerine Dream	
2006	Follow Me Around	
2006	The Big One	
2007	Lost and Found	
2008	That's It, That's All	
2008	Under the Influence	
2010	Jeremy Jones' Deeper	Also director
2011	The Art of Flight	
2011	Jeremy Jones' Further	
2013	McConkey	
2014	Jeremy Jones' Higher	Also director
2015	Meru	
2015	The Search for Freedom	
2016	The Fourth Phase	
2017	Rogue Elements	
2017	28 Winters: A Nitro Snowboard Story	
2018	Ode to Muir: The High Sierra	Also director
2018	Far Out	
2019	Roadless	
2020	Purple Mountains	

=== Television ===
Year	Title	Notes
2009	Moments of Impact	Episode #1.7
2013–2016	Ultimate Rush	3 episodes
2014	Pat Moore: Blueprint	16 episodes
2014	60 Minutes Sports	2 episodes
2016	The Book of John J	9 episodes
2017	ABC of...	Episode: "Snowboarding"
2022	Edge of the Earth	Episode: "Into the Void"
