= Burton Snowboards =

American manufacturing company

Burton Snowboards Inc.
- Type: Private
- Industry: Sporting goods
- Founded: 1977; 49 years ago
- Founder: Jake Burton Carpenter
- Headquarters: Burlington, Vermont
- Key people: Jake Burton Carpenter, Founder and Chairman
- Products: Snowboard equipment, apparel, accessories
- Number of employees: Over 600 U.S., 950 Global
- Website: www.burton.com

Burton Snowboards is a privately owned snowboard manufacturer founded by Jake Burton Carpenter in 1977. The company specializes in products aimed at snowboarders, such as snowboards, bindings, boots, outerwear, and accessories. The company, whose flagship store is in Burlington, Vermont, was privately owned by Jake Burton Carpenter (also known as Jake Burton), until his death in 2019, and by his wife, Donna Carpenter, who has been active in the business since 1983.

== History ==
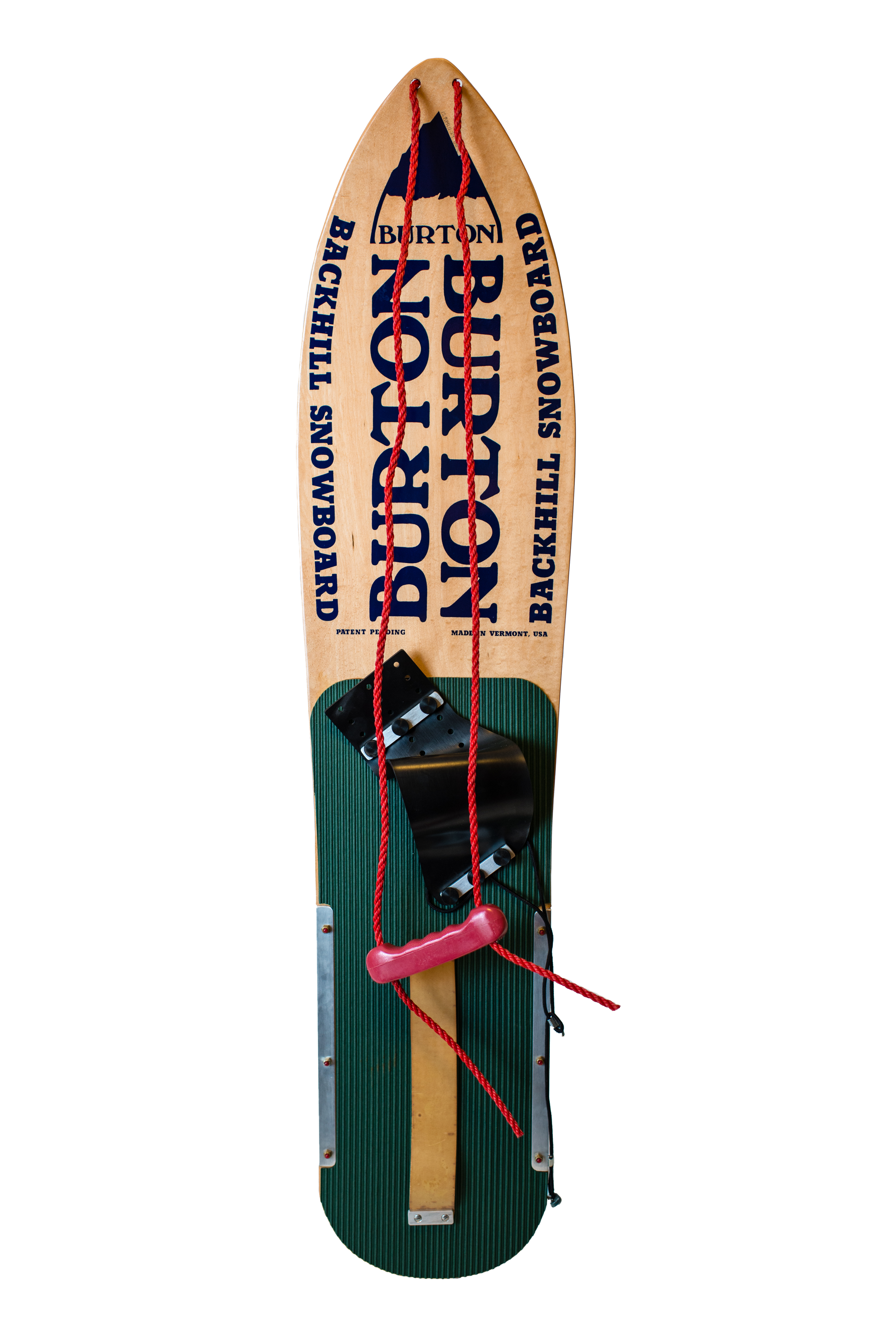
Top view of a c. 1981 Burton snowboard in museum condition

Burton Snowboards was founded by Jake Burton and his wife Donna Carpenter in 1977. His co-founder, Dimitrije Milovich, was an East Coast surfer and the founder of snowboard company Winterstick. Their snowboards were inspired by the Snurfer, which was created in 1965 by Sherman Poppen. In 1977, Burton moved to Londonderry, Vermont, where he made the first Burton snowboard in his garage, by hand. Since Burton could not afford proper equipment, he applied polyurethane to the prototype. In 1978, the company moved to Manchester, Vermont.

Jake Burton campaigned for local ski resorts to open their lifts to snowboard riders. In 1982, the Suicide Six Ski Area, now called Saskadena Six Ski Area, in Pomfret, Vermont, was reportedly the first mountain to permit snowboarders, followed by Stratton Mountain, and later Jay Peak and Stowe. When resorts began allowing snowboarders on lifts, the public followed suit, and Burton became one of the main suppliers for snowboarders.

In 1982, Burton marketed its product at the National Snowboarding Championships, held at Suicide Six. Snow Valley also allowed snowboarders and, in 1984, hosted the US Open. In 1985, the National Snowboarding Championships moved to Stratton Mountain and became the U.S. Open Snowboarding Championships, which was owned and operated by Burton. This competition helped legitimize the sport.

In 1985, Burton established the European Division of Burton Snowboards in Innsbruck, Austria. In 1986, distribution began in New Zealand. In 1992, the Burton factory relocated to Burlington, Vermont. In 1994, Burton opened its Japan division in Urawa-shi. In 2014, there were 400 employees in Burlington and 1,000 worldwide.

As of 2009, Burton owned ten companies that sold snowboards, outerwear, and shoes. In 2008, Burton began to make surfboards in Vermont.

For many years, Burton and his wife—Donna Gaston Carpenter, whom he had married in 1983—hosted the Fall Bash to promote goodwill among company employees and friends. In 2009, the Fall Bash became the subject of controversy after the company attempted to censor the press about it.

In 2010, Burton announced that Burton Snowboards would cease manufacturing in Vermont and move production to Austria. More recently, the company has shifted some of its snowboard production to China.

In December 2011, Burton named his wife, Donna Carpenter, as president of the company. In 2013, Donna Carpenter estimated that the company had 40 to 45% of the snowboarding market, which totaled $236 million. She said that the U.S. market accounted for 35% of the company's business, with Europe at 30%, and Japan and Canada accounting for the rest.

In May 2014, Burton named Mike Rees as CEO, while remaining as founder and chairman. In December 2015, Burton named Donna Carpenter as CEO (Mike Rees having left to be closer to family) and John Lacy as president.

In 2016, Burton's Chief Creative Officer, Greg Dacyshyn, said he wanted to maintain the brand's connection to both snowboarding and lifestyle culture.

Jake Burton Carpenter died at his home on November 20, 2019, due to a recurrence of testicular cancer.

In 2020, the City of Burlington approved plans by Burton Snowboards to relocate Higher Ground, Vermont's biggest music venue, to a vacant warehouse at the company's Queen City Park Road facility as part of a broader entertainment complex. The State of Vermont granted additional permits in 2022, but the project faced appeals from a neighborhood group, Citizens for Responsible Zoning, who raised concerns about noise, traffic, and parking overflow into nearby residential streets. In April 2023, the case went to trial, and on July 12, 2023, Vermont Superior Court Judge Mary Miles Teachout upheld the permits, allowing the project to proceed. While supporting the overall plan, the court required Burton to take specific mitigation measures, including sound monitoring, parking enforcement, and event traffic management. Less than a week later, Higher Ground announced that Burton Snowboards had withdrawn from the plans to relocate the music venue to its Burlington headquarters.

== Design ==
A 2007 snowboard designed by Norwegian graphic designer Martin Kvamme is in the permanent collection of the National Museum of Norway.

== Technology ==
The first Burton snowboard was the BB1, a narrow board consisting of single-strap bindings with a rope and handle attached to the nose.

The company started using a single-channel binding-mounting system on its 2008 models. In 2009, this system was installed on other snowboard lines. A binding system was created to give the rider more control and a greater board feel. This binding system, named EST® (Extra Sensory Technology), eliminates weight by mounting the binding to the board from the sides rather than the middle, eliminating the middle baseplate.

== Company overview ==
Burton factory in 2009, including double chairlift, originally used at a resort, between streetlights

Burton is now the second-largest snowboard manufacturer in the US; and its products are marketed worldwide in over 4,348 stores, 1,536 of which are in the United States. In 2003, Burton allowed several online companies to sell its products online. For years, Burton products had been available only through local stores; but the company felt that an online presence would allow buyers to have an alternate way to buy Burton products, instead of having to turn to another brand.

In addition to selling Burton products, Burton stores also sell several sub-brands that focus on specific market niches. These sub-brands include Anon Optics (snowboard goggles, eyewear, and helmets), Analog (outerwear), and Gravis (footwear, now defunct). In 2005, Four Star Distribution sold four of its snowboard brands to Burton: Forum Snowboarding, Jeenyus, Foursquare, and Special Blend. Burton also owned surfboard manufacturer Channel Islands, but sold the brand in 2020.

The Burton line is split into four categories: freeride, for big-mountain riding; freestyle, for a versatile ride; park, for freestyle disciplines such as halfpipe and slopestyle; and carving, for carving down the sides of mountains. Each of these categories has different performance and price levels. In 2009, Burton's line included 61 snowboards in men's, women's, and youth models. Board prices range from $300 to $1,500.

In February 2008, Burton acquired DNA Distribution, which includes the skateboard brands Alien Workshop, Habitat Skateboards, and Reflex.

In 2008, the snowboard equipment industry was worth $487 million. Burton had 40% to 70% of these sales, depending on the category. The average age of employees was 30.

== Marketing and promotion ==
To attract rider interest, Burton Snowboards sponsors professional riders and events. Burton's sponsored professional snowboard team includes: Zeb Powell, Mark McMorris, Taylor Gold, Shaun White, Jeremy Jones, Kazuhiro Kokubo, Terje Haakonsen, Ellery Hollingsworth, Kelly Clark, Hannah Teter, and Kevin Pearce. Burton has avoided having complete sponsorship with Burton/Burton-affiliated brands. Burton has come under criticism over its choices regarding team members, such as the removal of David Carrier Porcheron and other riders in 2008.

Burton sponsored the creation of organic terrain parks made of rocks, stumps, and logs. These parks, known as "The Stash" can be found at Northstar, California; Truckee, California; Jackson Hole, Wyoming; Killington Ski Resort, Vermont; Avoriaz, France; and The Remarkables, New Zealand.

Burton created the Chill program in 1995 to give children the opportunity to learn to snowboard. Since its founding, Chill has provided over 12,000 underprivileged children with the opportunity to learn how to snowboard. Because of the 2008 graphics controversy and concern over its effect on youth, a local beneficiary severed its ties with Burton.

Burton created the Learn to Ride program in 1998. It was the only snowboard company to focus on instruction methods and beginner-specific equipment. Its goal was to give beginner snowboarders the best possible initial snowboarding experience, so they would continue snowboarding. Burton has teamed up with the American Association of Snowboard Instructors, the Canadian Association of Snowboard Instructors, and major resorts around the world.

In December 2016, Burton launched a pop-up shop on Newbury Street in Boston, though this store would later close in the mid 2020's

== Controversies ==
In 2008, several complaints arose when Burton produced snowboards that had illustrations of self-mutilation and Playboy bunnies. As a result, the Burton Love model was discontinued for the 2012 line and replaced by the Mr. Nice Guy.

In January 2022, BBC News reported on Burton's expansion into China and its promotion of Xinjiang for winter sports tourism (ahead of China's hosting the Winter Olympics). Craig Smith, who leads Burton's China operations, told the BBC the company didn't want to abandon the region by refusing to do business there, despite allegations of human rights abuse, including genocide of the Uyghurs.

Allegations that the local Uyghur population of Xinjiang has been forced into labor picking cotton have also been found to be at odds with Burton's membership in the Better Cotton Initiative, an organization that works to eliminate forced labor from cotton production.
