= Zeb Powell =

American snowboarder (born 2000)

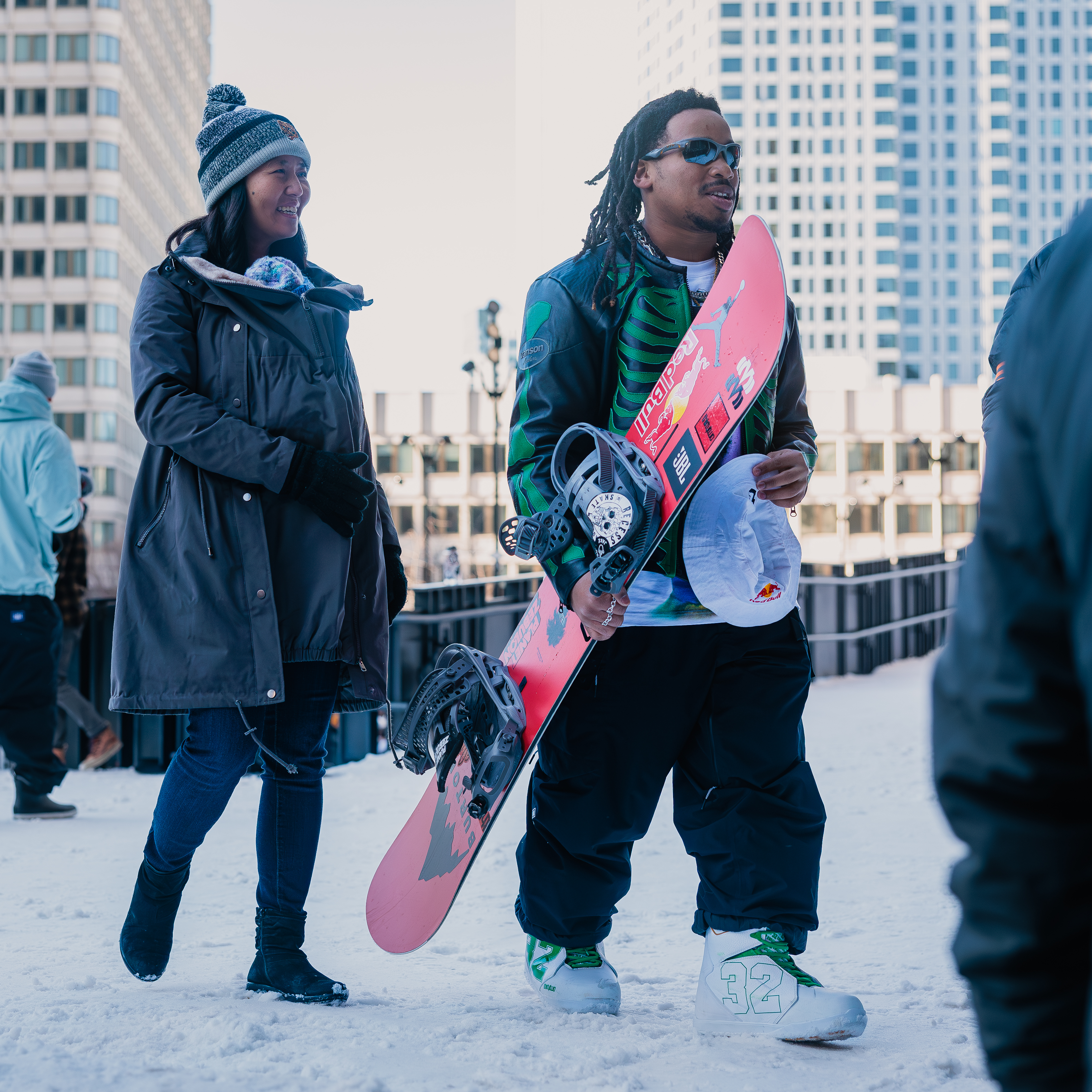
- Powell walks with Boston mayor Michelle Wu at Red Bull Heavy Metal Boston in 2025
- Born: January 18, 2000 (age 26); Charlotte, North Carolina, U.S.
- Occupation: Snowboarder
- Years active: 2014–present
- Sports career
- Country: United States
- Sport: Snowboarding

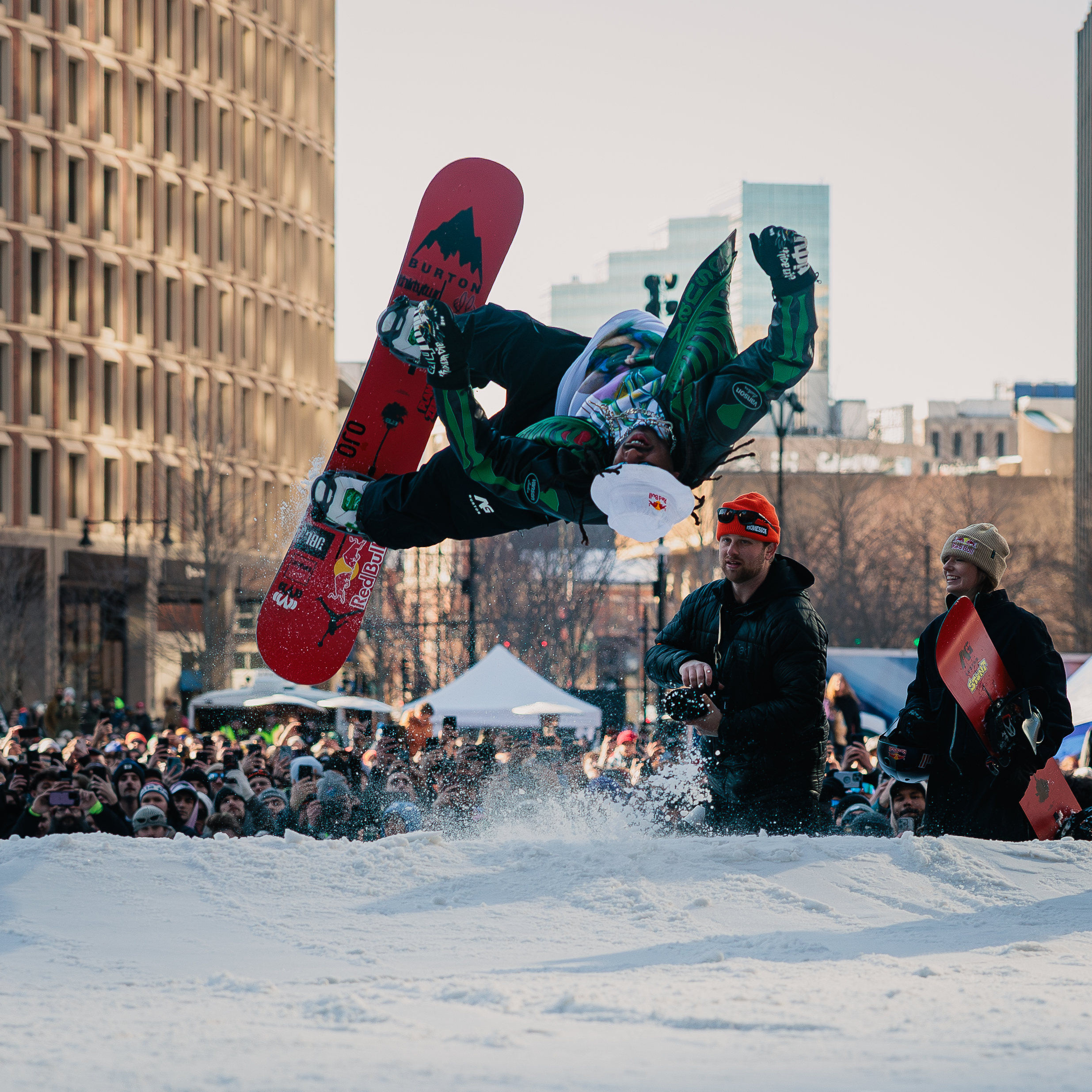
Zeb competing at Red Bull Heavy Metal Boston in 2025

Zeb Powell (born January 18, 2000) is an American professional snowboarder from North Carolina. He is best known for his unique style that won him gold in the 2020 Winter X Games Knuckle Huck. Being the first black snowboarder to win gold in X Games history, Powell partnered with Hoods to Woods, an organization that aims to use snowboarding to have a positive impact on inner city youth.

== Early life ==
Powell was born in Charlotte, North Carolina, and raised by adoptive parents Carl Powell and Valerie Powell in Waynesville, North Carolina. His father Carl runs a chip mill and his mother Valerie is an assistant teacher. Zeb did not enjoy snowboarding at a young age due to an instructor forcing him to ride in regular stance, as opposed to his natural goofy. Nevertheless he persisted, going on to win his first competition, Red Bull All Snow, at the age of 15.

== On the mountain ==
The following is a list of accolades earned by Zeb Powell in various snowboarding competitions and events:

- X Games 2020 Knuckle Huck – 1st place
- X Games 2022 Knuckle Huck – 4th place
- X Games 2024 Knuckle Huck – 2nd place
- X Games 2025 Knuckle Huck – 4th place
- Red Bull All Snow 2016 at Carinthia Parks – 1st place

Powell is sponsored by many brands including Redbull, Burton Snowboards, Thirtytwo Apparel, Recess Ride Shop, and Crab Grab gloves and stomp pads.

In April 2025, Powell officially signed with the Jordan Brand, becoming the first professional snowboarder to represent the label.

== Off the mountain ==
Zeb is a partner of the Hoods to Woods foundation, which aims to help inner city youth by exposing them to the positive impacts that snowboarding can have
