= Protect Our Winters =

Climate change focused nonprofit

- Abbreviation: POW
- Founded: 2007; 19 years ago
- Type: Non-governmental organization, non-profit organization
- Tax ID no.: 20-8474909
- Legal status: 501(c)(3)
- Purpose: Climate Action, Outdoor Industry, Environmentalism
- Headquarters: Boulder, Colorado
- Region served: Worldwide
- Founder and President: Jeremy Jones
- Executive Director: Torrey Udall
- Board of directors: Wayne Hare; Damon Berger; Massimo Alpian; Michael Bennett; Matt Mullin; Sarah Steele; Michael "Ryan" Leuthner; Joel Simkins; Bryan Cole; Greg Szewczyk
- Website: https://protectourwinters.org

Protect Our Winters (POW) is a 501(c)(3) nonprofit organisation that focuses on law reform for environmental issues and civic engagement campaigns such as sharing news from climate scientists. The organization's headquarters are located in Boulder, Colorado, United States. According to the nonprofit's policy webpage, POW focuses its efforts on legislation regarding carbon pricing, solar, public lands, and transportation. POW receives financial support from The North Face, Patagonia and CLIF Bar and many other corporate companies, partners, foundations, individuals and resorts. The current CEO of POW is Erin Sprague.

== History ==
POW was created in 2007 by professional snowboarder Jeremy Jones, strives to turn outdoor enthusiasts into climate advocates. Jeremy holds the position of founder and president.

== Activism ==
In December 2012, POW worked in partnership with the Natural Resources Defense Council to publish a study determining how climate change is affecting the economy of the winter sport and tourism industry in the United States.

The organization, despite the United States federal government shutdown of 2013, sent a delegation to Washington to meet with senators and discuss the issues surrounding climate change.

On December 3, 2013, POW spoke with EPA Administrator Gina McCarthy on POW's influence on the winter sport community and POW agreed to fully support the EPA and Clean Air Act (United States).

POW partnered with several Yale students to meet with winter athletes during the 2014 Winter Olympics at Sochi to promote a more open discussion about the effects of climate change.

POW also participated at a march at New York City during the UN Climate Summit of 2014.

In 2018, POW executed two congressional briefings and three lobby days, including the highest attended annual September Lobby Day (35 attendees meeting with a total of 30 Congressional Offices). They had nine companies represented, including Alterra Mountain Company, Aspen Skiing Company, Bemis Associates, Burton, Mt. Bachelor, POWDR Corporation, Ski Utah, Smartwool, and Spyder.

In November 2025 in the UK, POW started a campaign to lobby for better public transport - their 'Clean Miles' campaign

== In Canada ==
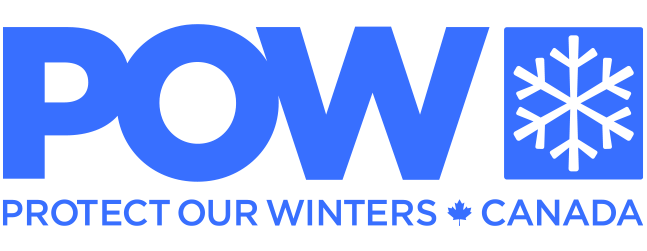
Logo for Protect Our Winters Canada

A separate organization, Protect Our Winters Canada, has 13 regional chapters and more than 43,000 members as of 2026.
