= Splitboard =

Type of snowboard

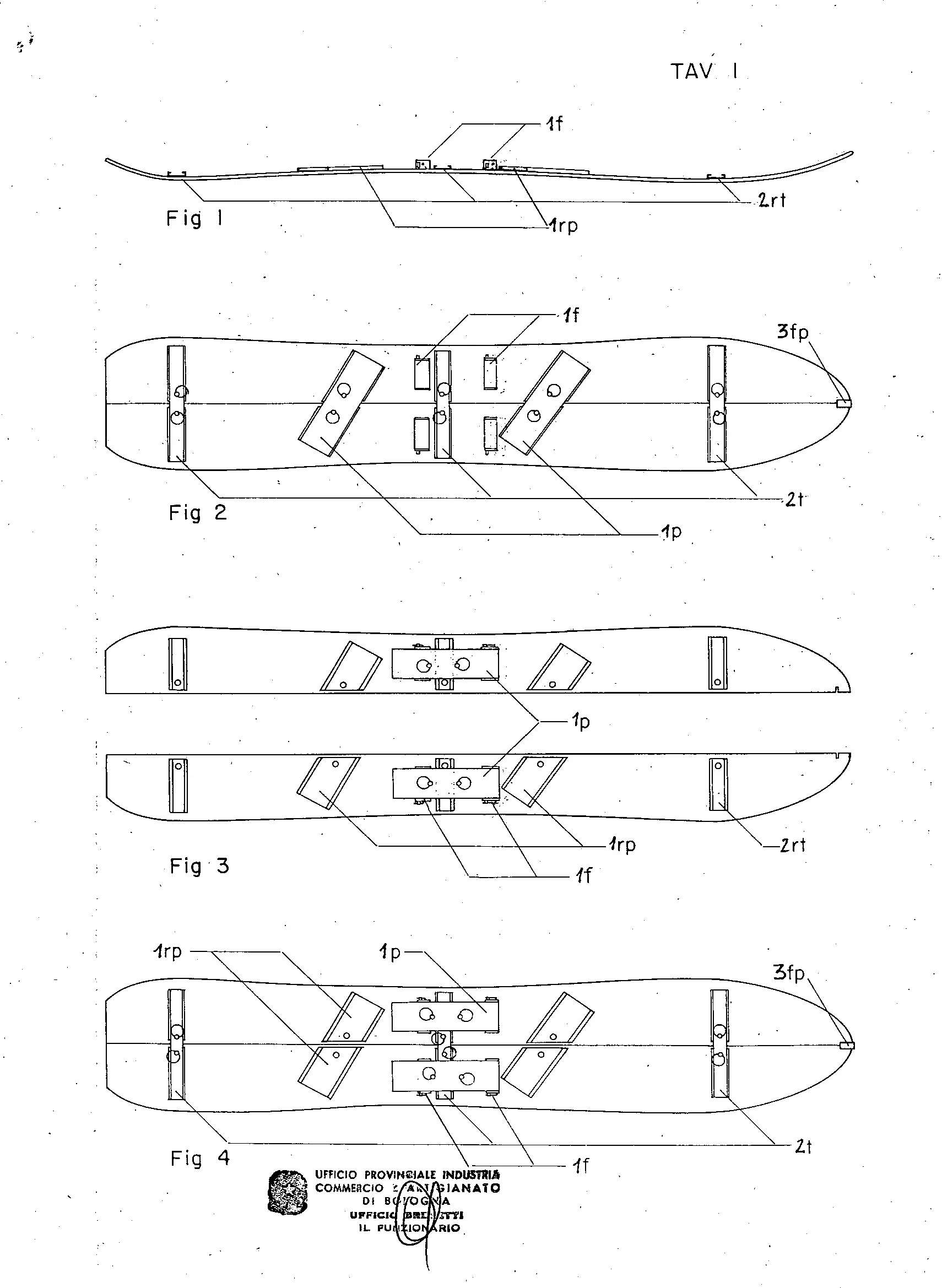
Original Patent Manaresi Splitboard 1990

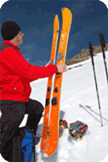
A splitboard is cut down the middle and used as two approach skis to access the back country

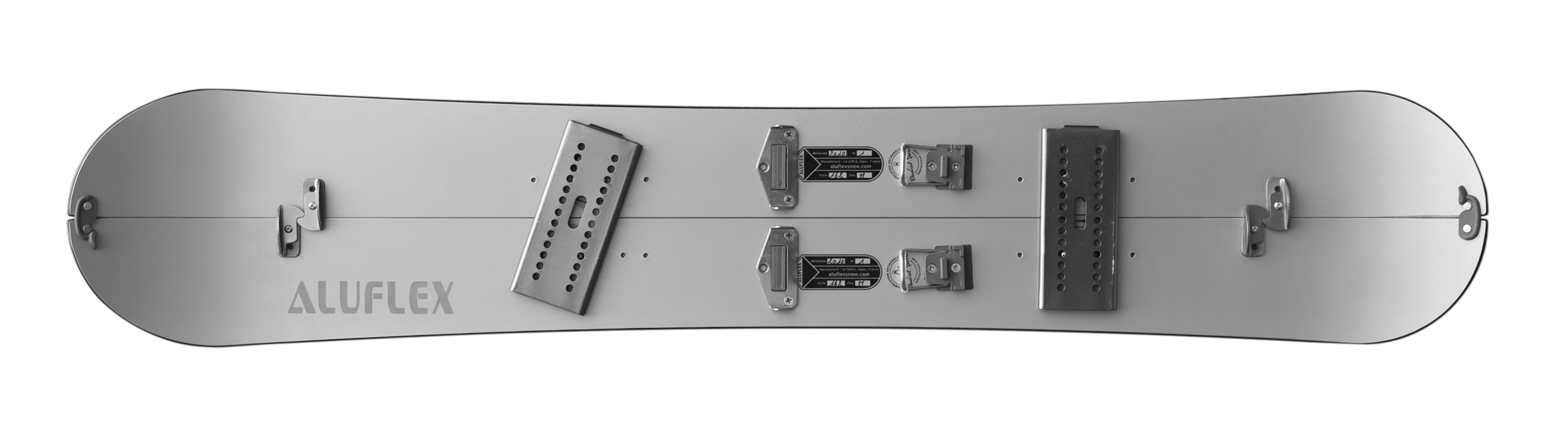
Splitboard, with both halves connected

A splitboard is a snowboard that can be separated into two ski-like parts used with climbing skins to ascend slopes in the same way as alpine touring or telemark skis. The main difference is that a splitboard will have an additional metal edge (down the center of the board) for extra grip in ski mode. Unlike normal snowboards, it will also have nose and tail clips, split hooks, and touring mounts. Similar to cross country skiing, splitboarding allows free heel movement and with skins attached to the bottom of the skis, provides uphill traction. The two halves can then be connected to form a regular snowboard for descent. Splitboarding culture often focuses on the idea of using your own power to access the backcountry usually on unmaintained trails.

== Background ==
When snowboarding originated in 1965, it was prohibited in resorts across America until the 1984-85 snowboard season. By the early 1990s, the majority of resorts across the US opened their doors to snowboarders, and less than five years later splitboarding emerged. The development of splitboarding simplified backcountry snowboarding, making pristine powder beyond the lift lines accessible to winter recreation enthusiasts.

In April 1990, an article of a patent of a split board made by Nicolò Manaresi from Bologna was published in an Italian magazine SKATESNOWBOARD, a photo of a Sims board split in two appears (source Erik Pernisco). A first splitboard set-up was shown on that magazine, for which the patent application was filed on 7 March 1990. Thanks to a research by Ettore Personnettaz it was possible to contact the inventor and the original documents were found, in the following link it is possible to view original images of the patent: https://www.freeridealliance.com/2020/10/29/history-of-the-splitboard/

In 1991, Brett "Kowboy" Kobernik brought a crude prototype of the first splitboard to Mark "Wally" Wariakois, the founder of Voile. At the time Wally was intensely focused on innovating new backcountry ski and telemark binding designs, but he saw the future of backcountry snowboarding in Kowboy's crude design. Over the next few years, Kowboy and Wally refined this idea and in 1994 released the first DIY Voile Split Kit. This was the beginning of the splitboard revolution. For the first time riders had a truly innovative and easier way to access backcountry powder. Surveys from SIA showed an increase in the number of skiers and snowboarders using non-resort backcountry terrain from 1.8 million to 2.2 million in a four-year time period. That number significantly increased as well from 4.3 million to 6.3 million when resort backcountry terrain was included. The popularity of splitboarding in the last decade has prompted many outfitters to offer half day, full day or even multi-day excursions across the globe.

Around 2006, several new splitboarding companies arose, especially Karakoram and Spark R&D. Before 2006, Voile was the dominant splitboarding company, selling the early track system binding that was a precursor to the modern style split specific binding and puck systems. Since 2006, lighter-weight metals and plastics have been introduced into the binding systems, creating a more responsive and durable splitboard binding. The introduction of new companies and technologies allowed for a greater variety of snowboards than previously: splitboards can come in hybrid camber styles, full camber styles, volume shifted shapes, powder shapes, and also are designed for women and children.
