= Outline of skiing =

Overview of and topical guide to skiing

The following outline is provided as an overview of and topical guide to skiing:

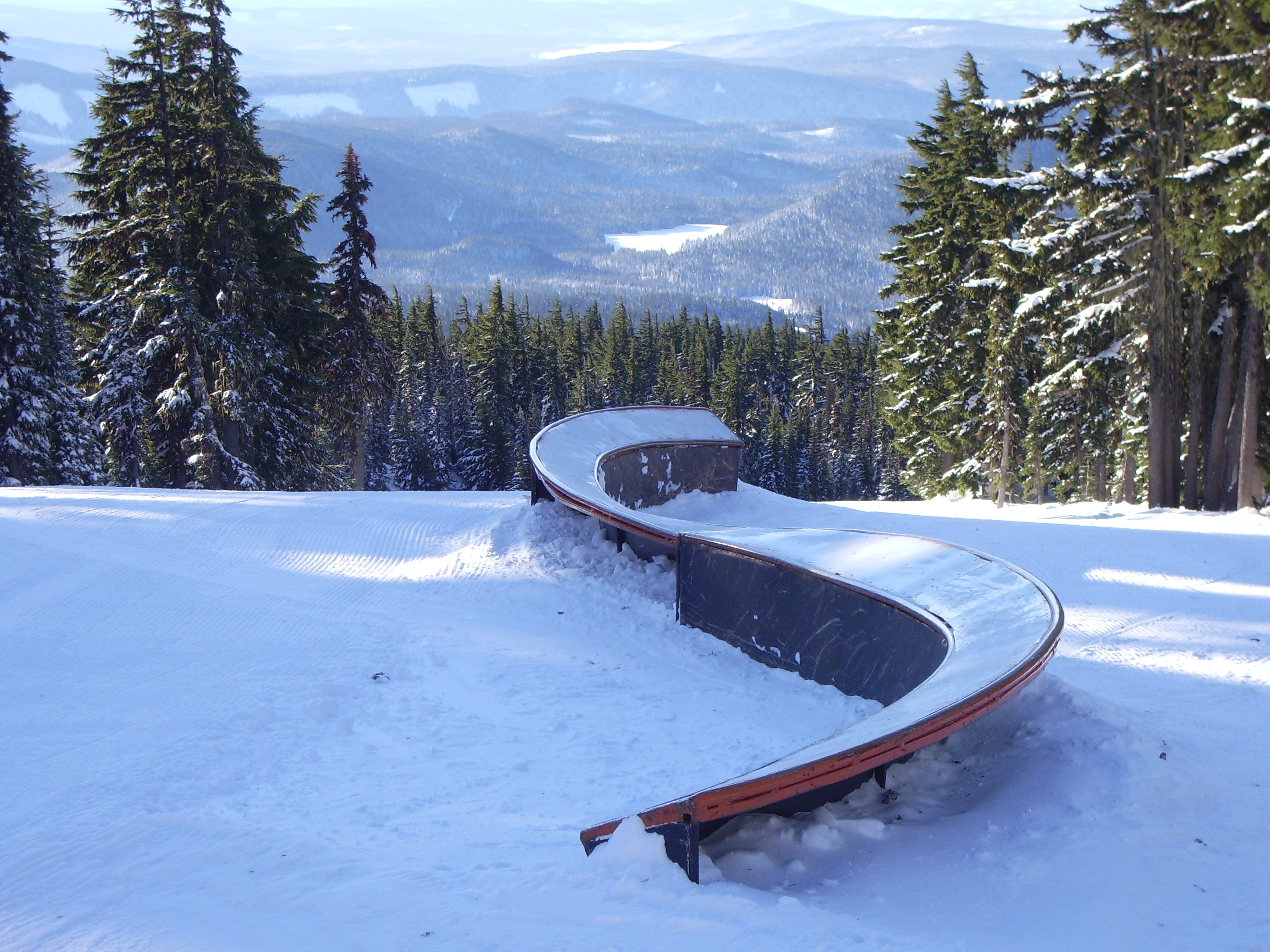
Terrain park feature for the daring

Skiing is a recreational activity using skis as equipment for traveling over snow. Skis are used in conjunction with boots that connect to the ski with use of a binding.

== Overview ==
- Glossary of skiing and snowboarding terms
- History of skiing
- Ski warfare
- Physics of skiing

== Lists ==
- List of ski areas and resorts
- List of ski jumping hills
- List of Olympic venues in freestyle skiing
- List of FIS Cross-Country World Cup champions
- List of FIS Ski Jumping World Cup team medalists
- List of FIS Nordic World Ski Championships medalists in ski jumping
- List of Olympic medalists in freestyle skiing
- List of Olympic medalists in ski jumping
- List of presidents of FIS
- List of skiing deaths

== Types of skiing ==
=== Alpine Skiing ===
- Alpine skiing (also known as downhill skiing)
- Alpine touring (Randonée)
- Extreme skiing
- Freeriding
- Freeskiing (or newschool skiing)
- Freestyle skiing
- Glade Skiing
- Heliskiing
- Mogul skiing
- Monoskiing
- Disabled alpine skiing
- Ski mountaineering
- Skwal
- Snowcat skiing
- Snowkiting
- Speed skiing

=== Nordic Skiing ===
- Cross-country skiing
- Backcountry skiing
- Biathlon
- Disabled Nordic skiing
- Nordic combined
- Telemark skiing
- Skijoring
- Ski jumping and Ski flying
- Ski touring

=== Non-snow skiing ===
- Dry ski slope
- Grass skiing
- Sand skiing
- Roller skiing
- Water skiing

== Instruction and techniques ==
- Ski school
- Ski simulator

=== Turning techniques ===
- Stem techniques
  - The Snowplough - (also known as the wedge) - see snowplough turn
  - The Stem Christie
- Parallel turn
- Carve turn
- Pivot turn (skiing)
- Jump turn
- Telemark turn

=== Cross-country techniques ===
- Skate skiing

=== Ski-jumping techniques ===
- Ski jumping techniques

== Equipment and Apparel ==
- Skis
- Ski bindings
- Ski boots
- Ski poles with pole guards if a racer
- Ski wax depending on the condition and temperature
- Ski skins if climbing uphill
- Ski suit
  - Parka, anorak, or shell
  - Ski pants or salopettes
  - If a Racer — a race suit
- Fleece top or sweater; the mid-layer or insulating garment
- Thermal underwear and ski socks
- Gloves or mittens to keep hands warm
  - Hand Warmers
- Ski helmet
- Goggles or sunglasses to protect eyes from harm
- Face mask to protect from wind
- Specialized Alpine touring equipment

== Competition events ==
- Winter Olympic Games - A major international sporting event held once every four years for sports practised on snow and ice.
- Winter Paralympic Games
- Four Hills Tournament
- Winter X Games
- Birkebeinerrennet
- American Birkebeiner
- Tour of Anchorage
- The British Land National Ski Championships

=== Alpine events ===
- Alpine skiing at the Winter Olympics
- Alpine Skiing World Cup
- Alpine World Skiing Championships
- Slalom
- Giant slalom
- Super giant slalom
- Downhill
- Alpine skiing combined
- Speed Skiing

=== Freestyle events ===
- Freestyle skiing at the Winter Olympics
- FIS Freestyle Skiing World Cup
- FIS Freestyle World Ski Championships
- Aerials
- Mogul skiing
- Ski ballet
- Half-pipe skiing
- Slopestyle
- Ski cross

=== Nordic events ===
- Nordic combined at the Winter Olympics
- FIS Nordic Combined World Cup
- FIS Nordic World Ski Championships
- Biathlon
- Nordic combined
- Ski jumping
- Cross-country skiing (sport)

== Skiing organizations ==
International organizations

- International Biathlon Union (IBU)
- International Ski Federation (FIS)
- Worldloppet Ski Federation
- International Ski Instructors Association (ISIA)
- Fédération Internationale des Patrouilles de Ski (FIPS)
- International Skiing History Association (ISHA)

National organizations

- U.S. Ski & Snowboard
- United States Ski Team
- Women's Ski Jumping USA
- US National Ski Hall of Fame
- US National Ski Patrol
- Professional Ski Instructors of America
- U.S. National Ski Areas Association
- Alpine Canada Alpin
- Biathlon Canada
- Canadian Snowboard Federation
- Nordic Combined Ski Canada
- Ski Jumping Canada
- Cross Country Canada
- Canadian Freestyle Ski Association
- Canadian Ski Instructors' Alliance
- Canadian Ski Patrol
- Canadian Adaptive Snowsports
- Snowsport GB - The British Ski and Snowboard Federation
- Ski Club of Great Britain
- British Association of Snowsport Instructors (BASI)
- Snowsport Cymru/Wales
- New Zealand Snowsports Instructors Alliance
- Snow Australia
- Austrian Ski Association (ÖSV)
- Fédération Française de Ski
- German Ski Association (DSV)
- Norwegian Ski Federation
- Swedish Ski Association
- Swiss Ski
- Italian Winter Sports Federation (FISI)
- Royal Spanish Winter Sports Federation (RFEDI)
- Ski Association of Slovenia (SLOSKI)
- Finnish Ski Association
- Ski and Snowboarding Foundation Nepal
- Ski Federation of Ukraine

== Ski areas and resorts ==
- Ski area
- Ski lodge
- Ski resort
- List of ski areas and resorts
- Lift ticket
- Piste
- Terrain park
- Ski season
- Snowmaking
- Snow grooming
- Resort hotel

== Ski lifts ==
Ski lift

- Aerial tramway (or cable car)
- Gondola lift
- Hybrid lift
- Chairlift
- Detachable chairlift (often a higher speed chairlift)
- Funitel
- Funicular
- Surface lift
  - Rope & Handle tow
  - T-bar, J-bar & Platter lift
  - Magic carpet

== Media ==
- Ski film
- Ski Canada magazine
- Ski Sunday UK TV
- The Ski Channel
- Norsk idrætsblad magazine, particularly 1881–1915
- The Master Skier magazine of USSA
- Skiing magazine of US

== Culture ==
- Holmenkollen Ski Festival
- World Ski and Snowboard Festival
- Ski train
- Skiing in New Zealand
  - Club skifield in NZ
- Skiing in Australia
- Skiing in India
- Skiing in Lebanon

== Other ==
- Artificial ski slope
- Indoor ski slope

== Hazards ==
- Altitude sickness
- Avalanche
- Injuries
  - Anterior cruciate ligament
  - Fracture
  - Shin-bang
  - Wilderness first aid
- Frost bite
- Hypothermia
- Windburn
- Snow blindness
- Ski sickness
- List of famous skiing deaths
- Tree well

== See also ==
- Outline of sports
