= Glossary of skiing and snowboarding terms =

This glossary of skiing and snowboarding terms is a list of definitions of terms and jargon used in skiing, snowboarding, and related winter sports.

== A ==
aerial lift

A class of cable-based transport for snow sports where skiers and snowboarders are carried uphill aboard chairs, cars, cabins, or gondolas suspended from a cable in the air, as opposed to surface lifts, where they remain on the ground.
aerial skiing
A sub-discipline of freestyle skiing and a competitive Winter Olympic event in which participants ski off of 2–4-metre (7–13 ft) jumps, propelling them into the air, and then attempt to perform various aerial maneuvers including multiple flips and twists before landing on a designated inclined landing hill.
all mountain
A type of ski or snowboard that is designed to be the jack of all trades and suitable for any terrain or style of skiing or snowboarding. From groomed runs and snowpark to powder and backcountry lines, with all-mountain skis or snowboard you’re ready for anything.
alpine skiing

A discipline of skiing that involves sliding down snow-covered slopes on skis with fixed-heel bindings, as opposed to other types of skiing (such as cross-country) which use skis with free-heel bindings. Alpine skiing is popular as a recreational activity and competitive sport, both at ski resorts and off-piste.
alpine touring (AT)

Ski touring through very steep, alpine terrain. Alpine touring makes use of a specialized binding that allows the heel to be raised when ascending steep slopes but locked down for full support when skiing downhill.
après-ski
Entertainment, nightlife, or other social activity that occurs at a ski resort after skiing finishes for the day. The culture originated in the Alps, where it remains most popular.
Arlberg technique
The first organized system of teaching the principles of skiing, developed by Hannes Schneider in the 1930s.
avalament
The way a skier bends and extends his legs by managing pressure such that the skier allows it to push their legs into their chest while maintaining good contact with the snow.

== B ==
backcountry

Any area outside of the boundaries of a ski resort, or else not patrolled, groomed, or cleared of avalanche danger. Backcountry areas are usually remote from roads and services and only accessible by long tours, hiking, snowmobile, or helicopter.
backcountry skiing

Skiing in a backcountry area, generally over ungroomed, unmarked, and unpatrolled slopes.
backcountry snowboarding
Snowboarding in a backcountry area, generally over ungroomed, unmarked, and unpatrolled slopes.
baseplate
The bottom portion of a binding which acts as the point of direct contact between the boot and the ski or snowboard and therefore transfers all movement.
basket
A round or star-shaped piece of plastic located at the bottom of a ski pole and used to keep the pole from pushing too deeply into the snow.
berm
Another name for a snowbank.
biathlon
binding
A device that connects a ski boot to a ski or snowboard, holding the boot firmly so as to allow the skier or snowboarder to transfer the motion of their legs and feet to the ski or snowboard. Most bindings automatically release the boot if certain force limits are exceeded in order to minimize injury during a fall or impact.
boardercross
See snowboard cross.
boot
A type of footwear designed specifically for skiing or snowboarding to provide a way to firmly attach the skier's feet to skis or a snowboard in combination with bindings.
bowl
A wide mountain basin with slopes on at least three sides that is generally free of trees and other obstacles and conducive to large, swooping turns or steep, speedy dives.
bunny slope
A flat or nearly flat, well-groomed area, usually located near the base of a slope, reserved for beginning skiers or snowboarders and those taking lessons.

== C ==
carve turn
A turning technique used in skiing in which the skier turns by tilting one or both skis onto their edges, whereupon the geometry of the ski's sidecut causes the ski to bend into an arc and naturally follow this arc shape to produce a turning motion. Performed most easily using specialized carving skis, carve turns allow skiers to retain much of their speed while turning because, unlike the stem christie and parallel turn, the skis do not create drag by sideslipping.
carving ski
A specialized type of ski designed specifically for efficient carve turns, typically with a wide tip and tail and a relatively narrow waist.
chairlift
A type of ski lift used for uphill transportation to the top of a ski slope, consisting of a series of chairs, each accommodating one to four skiers, suspended from a continuously moving cable. Skiers board the lift at the bottom of the slope and are deposited at the top, after which the empty chairs are returned to the bottom again.
chatter
Vibration of skis or snowboards caused by traveling at high speeds. Chatter can reduce contact between the ski and the snow and therefore the ability to stay in control.
combined
corduroy
The parallel grooves visible on a trail or slope that has been recently groomed by a snowcat or other grooming machine.
cross-country skiing

A type of skiing where skiers rely on their own locomotion to move across snow-covered terrain, rather than using ski lifts or other forms of assistance. Cross-country skiers propel themselves either by striding forward or side-to-side in a skating motion and by using their arms to push on ski poles against the snow. Cross-country skiing is popular as a competitive sport and recreational activity but is also used as a means of transportation.

== D ==
DIN setting
The tension-release setting which determines the amount of force required for a ski binding to release from the skier's boot during a fall or impact. DIN is an acronym for the German Deutsche Institut für Normung.
downhill
downhill ski
The lower ski (i.e. lower on the hill than the uphill ski) or the one that will become the lower ski during a turn.
downhill skiing
See alpine skiing.
dry ski slope

== E ==
edge
The sharpened metal strip on either side of a ski or snowboard, used for gaining control by "biting" into the snow. "Holding an edge" is a key technique to maintaining a smooth, stable turn.
extreme skiing
A style of skiing performed on very long, very steep slopes (often from 45 to 60+ degrees from horizontal) in remote and unmanaged mountainous terrain, where the likelihood and consequences of a fall or injury present inherently dangerous conditions for skiers.

== F ==
free heel
freeriding

A style of snowboarding and sometimes skiing performed on natural, off-piste, ungroomed terrain without a set course, goals, or rules, eschewing man-made features such as jumps, rails, and half-pipes and emphasizing the use of natural variation in terrain to perform tricks.
freeskiing
freestyle skiing

A competitive skiing event primarily focused on the performance of tricks and typically comprising aerial, mogul, half-pipe, ski cross, and slopestyle disciplines.
freestyle snowboarding
frontcountry

== G ==
giant slalom
glade skiing

A type of alpine skiing through areas with many trees, either off-piste or on a defined woods trail. Glade skiing is inherently more difficult and dangerous than skiing in treeless areas because of the many additional natural obstacles, which may include fallen logs, stumps, tree wells, concealed root systems, or unmarked cliffs and streams.
gondola
grits
Snow that is carried down a slope from the top of a hill or mountain by skiers and snowboarders throughout the day. It is similar to powder but usually comes from hardpack, and therefore is not smooth like fresh snow.
grooming

== H ==
half-pipe
half-pipe skiing
HangBoard
hardpack
Snow that has been densely compacted by repeated grooming or skiing and a lack of fresh snowfall, often found on the most popular trails and slopes within a ski resort's boundaries.
heliskiing
herringbone
The act or technique of generating forward momentum on skis by spreading the tips apart widely (in a "V" shape) and striding the legs forward independently of each other, so named for the geometric pattern this motion leaves behind in the snow. The technique can be useful when climbing uphill or traversing flat ground on skis.

== I ==
indoor skiing
Skiing within a large facility designed to mimic a natural ski hill, sometimes with snow analog surfaces rather than natural or artificial snow
inrun
A steep slope, frequently set on a high scaffolding, from which a ski jumper picks up speed prior to jumping.
itinéraire
An officially marked (usually with yellow poles), patrolled, but ungroomed off-piste slope found in European ski resorts.

== J ==
jib
Riding a snowboard or skis across a non-snow surface, such as a rail, funbox, or fallen log.
jump turn
An aerial maneuver, performed when moving at a relatively slow speed, during which a skier or snowboarder makes a complete turn while in the air.

== K ==
kite skiing

== L ==
lift
See ski lift.
lift ticket

An identification tag which indicates that a skier or snowboarder has paid for the use of one or more ski lifts at a particular ski resort, usually attached to the ticketholder's outerwear for easy access.
liftie
A ski lift operator.
loipe
A route or trail that has been designed, built, and maintained specifically for cross-country skiing.

== M ==
magic carpet
A type of surface lift that functions similarly to a conveyor belt
mogul
A large round protrusion carved out of a snow surface, especially a slope, and typically occurring in "fields" of multiple moguls. Moguls are created both naturally by the repeated turns of skiers and artificially.
mogul skiing
monoski
A single wide ski with both bindings mounted parallel to the ski

== N ==
never-ever
A first-time skier or snowboarder.
new school skiing
See freeskiing.
night skiing
Skiing or snowboarding at night, an activity offered by certain ski resorts for a limited time after sundown. It is usually permitted only on carefully groomed pistes illuminated by floodlights.
Nordic combined
Nordic skiing
A discipline of skiing which involves the use of skis with free-heel bindings, in which only the toe of the ski boot is fixed to the binding, allowing the heel to rise off the ski independently, as opposed to alpine skiing and its variants, in which the boot is fixed to the ski from toe to heel. Nordic skiing is popular as a recreational activity and competitive sport, both at ski resorts and off-piste. Its many variants include cross-country skiing, Telemark skiing, and ski jumping.

== O ==
off-piste

Off a designated piste or trail; outside of the boundaries of a ski resort or other marked area reserved for use by skiers and snowboarders.
outrigger ski

== P ==
parallel turn
Turns made such that both skis are kept parallel throughout the duration of the turn
piste
A marked trail, run, or pathway down a mountain slope, reserved for skiing, snowboarding, or other alpine sports and generally within the boundaries of a ski resort. Pistes are usually groomed, marked with signage and indicated on maps, and rated by their difficulty, as opposed to off-piste areas.
piste basher
A machine used to groom pistes into ideal slopes for skiing and snowboarding, often a snowcat mounted with or towing specialized grooming equipment.
pivot turn
planker
A slang term for a skier.
poaching
Snowboarding at a resort where snowboards are explicitly prohibited.
pole planting
powder
Fresh, dry, loosely compacted, and lightweight snow, as opposed to densely compacted or repeatedly groomed snow such as hardpack.
powder ski
A type of ski with a very wide waist (generally between 105 and 130 mm), designed to "float" atop fresh powder by keeping the ski from sinking into the snow.
powder surfing

== R ==
randonnée
See alpine touring.
roller skiing
running surface
The bottom surface of a ski, designed to make contact with the snow.
runout
1. An expansive flat area at the base of a ski slope or the end of a run that allows skiers to slow down.
2. A relatively flat section of a ski route used to link tougher trails back to a ski lift.

== S ==
schussing
Skiing straight downhill without turning, usually at high speed.
shin-bang
Pain or discomfort in the lower anterior portion of the tibia (the shin) caused by prolonged pressing of the shin against the tongue of a ski boot. Shin-bang is common among both skiers and snowboarders, though the condition is generally not serious and is easily remedied.
sidecountry
sidecut
The inward curvature of a ski or snowboard, measured by the difference between the width of the ski or snowboard at the narrowest point of the waist and the width at the widest point of the tip or tail. The curvature of the sidecut greatly influences the ski or snowboard's turning radius: drastic sidecuts allow users to make sharper turns.
sideslipping
The slipping of skis sideways down a slope, perpendicular to the direction in which they are pointed.
ski
A narrow plank of semi-rigid material attached to the sole of the foot in order to allow the wearer to glide easily over snow, used in the sport of skiing. Skis are characteristically employed in pairs, one on each foot, and attached to specialized ski boots with bindings that secure the toe of the boot and in some disciplines also the heel.
ski cross
ski flying
ski goggles
A type of protective eyewear worn by skiers and snowboarders, designed for cold-weather use and to protect the eyes both from snow and from the glare of sunlight.
ski helmet
A type of helmet worn by skiers and snowboarders, specifically designed and constructed for winter sports.
ski jumping
ski lift

Any mechanism for transporting skiers and snowboarders up a slope. Lifts are typically a paid service operated by ski resorts.
ski lodge
A building located on the grounds of a ski resort that provides amenities such as food, drink, restrooms, and storage lockers, among others, for guests and patrons.
ski marathon
A long-distance, usually point-to-point race on skis, often covering more than 40 kilometres (25 mi). Racers may use a variety of skiing techniques depending on the rules of the competition. Participation is usually open to the public and major events may feature thousands of racers.
ski mountaineering
ski orienteering
ski patrol
Any team or organization, often employed by a ski resort, that promotes ski safety, enforces resort policies, and provides medical, rescue, and hazard prevention services to injured or disabled skiers and snowboarders, usually within the boundaries of a particular ski area but sometimes off-piste as well. Many ski patrollers have technical-medical certifications or EMS credentials, and may be trained in wilderness medicine, avalanche rescue, and/or evacuation by ski toboggan, snowmobile, or helicopter.
ski pole

A lightweight handheld pole, often made from aluminum or carbon fiber, used by skiers for balance and propulsion, typically in pairs. Ski poles are commonly used in alpine, freestyle, and cross-country disciplines, but seldom in other disciplines such as ski jumping.
ski resort
A resort developed for skiing, snowboarding, and/or other winter sports, typically situated within a naturally mountainous area and providing groomed pistes and one or more ski lifts to guests for a fee. The term may additionally include other amenities and services or even entire towns adjacent to but operated independently of the ski area.
ski school
An establishment or program that offers lessons in skiing or snowboarding, typically at a ski resort. Ski schools may teach a variety of disciplines and techniques to students at a wide range of skill levels, from first-time skiers to advanced or expert skiers.
ski season
The part of the year when skiing, snowboarding, or other alpine sports are viable at a particular ski resort, generally corresponding to the period between the resort's opening date and closing date, during which ski lifts are operating and lift passes can be purchased or used. Because these sports depend largely on the weather, the start and duration of a ski season can vary considerably between resorts due to latitude, altitude, and other climatic factors, and even for the same resort often varies somewhat from year to year.
ski skins

Removable strips of fabric that attach to the underside of skis, designed to allow the skis to slide forward on snow but not backward. Skins are often used in Nordic and touring disciplines to help skiers ascend backcountry slopes.
ski suit
A full-body suit, usually made of a lightweight but waterproof synthetic material, designed to be worn over normal clothing when skiing or snowboarding.
ski touring
A type of free-heel skiing done in the backcountry in unmarked or unpatrolled areas without the aid of ski lifts or other transport, often for long distances and multiple days. Ski touring combines elements of Nordic skiing and alpine skiing and embraces such sub-disciplines as Telemark and randonnée. Touring also typically requires independent navigation and route-finding skills. See also cross-country skiing.
ski wax
A material applied to the underside of snow runners such as skis and snowboards in order to improve their performance on various types of snow, typically either by minimizing kinetic friction with a so-called glide wax (used to make sliding easier in both alpine and cross-country disciplines) or by increasing static friction with a grip wax (used to increase traction in cross-country skiing). Both types of wax are designed to be specifically matched with the varying properties of snow, including crystal type and size and the moisture content of the snow surface.
skier's left
The general direction or area to the left of a skier moving or facing downhill.
skier's right
The general direction or area to the right of a skier moving or facing downhill.
skiing
A means of transport, a recreational activity, or a competitive winter sport in which the participant, known as a skier, glides across a snow-covered surface using skis attached to their feet.
skijoring
skwalling
A hybrid sport that attempts to combine the carving of skiing with the riding feel of snowboarding using a special piece of equipment called a skwal, which is similar to a snowboard or monoski in that both feet are attached to the same board; unlike a snowboard or monoski, however, on a skwal the feet are positioned one in front of the other, in line with the direction of forward movement.
slackcountry
slalom
A sub-discipline of alpine skiing and snowboarding and a competitive Winter Olympic event which involves skiing or snowboarding between marked poles or gates. In ordinary slalom events, the poles or gates are spaced more closely than those in giant slalom, super giant slalom, and downhill events, necessitating quicker and shorter turns.
slopestyle
snow cannon
A machine used in snowmaking to create artificial snow by spraying pressurized water into the air above a ski slope.
snowbank
snowboard
A round-edged board of semi-rigid material used in the sport of snowboarding, placed beneath and usually attached to the soles of both feet to allow the wearer to glide easily on snow. Snowboards are much wider than skis (typically between 6 and 12 inches (15 and 30 cm)) to accommodate both feet on the same board, and are differentiated from monoskis in that the rider stands with feet more or less transverse to the longitude of the board, perpendicular to the direction of travel.
snowboard cross

snowboard racing
snowboarding
A recreational activity or competitive winter sport in which the participant, known as a snowboarder or rider, descends a snow-covered slope while standing on a snowboard attached to their feet.
snowcat
A closed-cab, truck-sized vehicle propelled by a continuous track that is designed to move on snow. Snowcats are employed for a wide variety of purposes from personal use to industrial applications; they are often used for grooming trails and for transporting skiers to off-piste slopes in a discipline known as "snowcat skiing".
snowkiting
See kite skiing.
snowmaking
snowpack
Multiple layers of accumulated snowfall that persist where the climate is cold enough to prevent melting for extended periods during the year.
snowplough turn

snowskate
A type of compact snowboard, conceived of as a hybrid of a snowboard and a skateboard, intended primarily to allow riders to perform skateboard-style tricks on the snow.
speed skiing
splitboard
A snowboard that can be separated into two ski-like halves and fitted with climbing skins to allow the rider to ascend slopes in the same manner as randonnée and Telemark skis. Unlike normal snowboards, splitboards usually have nose and tail clips, split hooks, and touring mounts. Splitboarding allows for free-heel movement and, with skins attached, provides uphill traction; the two halves can later be reconnected to form a regular snowboard for descent.
stem
The technique of angling the tail of one ski away from the other ski, into a "V" position, while keeping the tips generally close together. Stemming is a fundamental movement in many techniques of turning and control.
stem christie

A basic turning technique used in skiing, initiated by stemming one ski outward at an angle to the direction of movement, which forces a change in direction opposite to the stemmed ski, and then bringing the other ski parallel to the angled ski for the duration of the turn.
super giant slalom

superpipe
surface lift

A class of cable-based transport for snow sports where skiers and snowboarders remain on the ground as they are pulled uphill, as opposed to aerial lifts, where they are suspended in the air.
swingweight
A specification used in manufacturing skis defined as the resistance of an unweighted ski to being turned. Lighter skis tend to have a lower swingweight than heavy skis.

== T ==
tail
The back end of a ski or snowboard, situated behind the skier or snowboarder.
Telemark skiing

A skiing technique and competitive sport that combines elements of alpine skiing and Nordic skiing, in which skiers perform sharp, carving turns using a squatting and lunging motion with knees bent, typically on skis with deep sidecuts and specialized free-heel bindings.

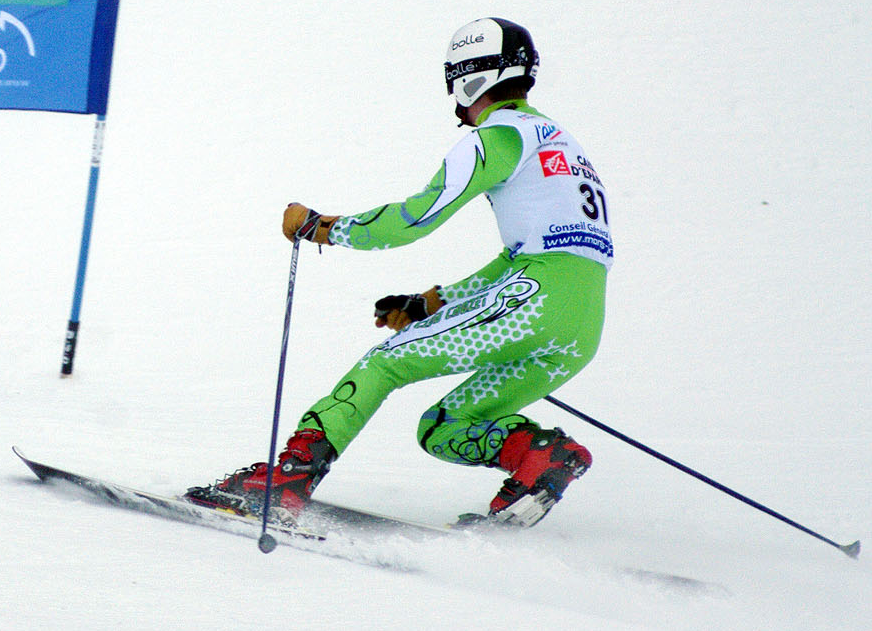
Telemark skiers perform fast, sharp turns with a unique motion that involves bending one knee and lunging forward

terrain park
An outdoor recreation area containing terrain and specially constructed obstacles (jumps, kickers, jibs, marked courses, etc.) designed to allow skiers and snowboarders to perform tricks.
tindy
A snowboarding trick in which the rider grabs the toe edge of the snowboard between the rear binding and the tail with his or her rear hand. It is a combination of an indy grab and a tail grab.
tip
The front end of a ski or snowboard, situated in front of the skier or snowboarder.
toe edge
The long edge of a snowboard toward which the rider's toes are pointed.
tracked out
The condition of a slope of once-fresh snow that has been ridden over repeatedly, discernible by the numerous visible tracks left by previous skiers or snowboarders.
tree well

A void or area of loose snow around a tree trunk and beneath its branches which forms because the branches prevent this space from receiving the same amount of snowfall as adjacent open spaces. Tree wells are a significant hazard to skiers and snowboarders because falling into one may result in serious injury, and they are often too deep to easily climb out.

== U ==
uphill ski
The upper ski (i.e. higher on the hill than the downhill ski) or the one that will become the upper ski during a turn.

== V ==
vertical drop
The difference in elevation between the base of a ski slope or mountain and its highest point. At ski resorts, this often refers to the highest point served by a ski lift rather than the geographical summit of a mountain.
virgin snow

== W ==
waist
The narrowest width of a ski as viewed from above, usually the area beneath where the ski boot is positioned.

== X ==
XC skiing
See cross-country skiing.

== Y ==
yard sale
A fall or crash in which the skier's or snowboarder's gear – skis, poles, hat, gloves, etc. – end up scattered across the slope.

== See also ==
- Outline of skiing
- Winter sports
