= Dietmar Thöni =

Austrian alpine skier (born 1968)

Dietmar Thöni (born 19 January 1968) is an Austrian former alpine skier.

== See also ==
- Alpine skiing in Austria
- Glossary of skiing and snowboarding terms
- History of skiing
