= Glade skiing =

Skiing through trees

Glade skiing (also known as glading) is alpine skiing through trees off-trail or on a defined woods trail. Glades are variously sought for their solitude, beauty, or caches of ungroomed powder. Woods also tend to hold better snow longer thanks to the shade and shelter trees provide.

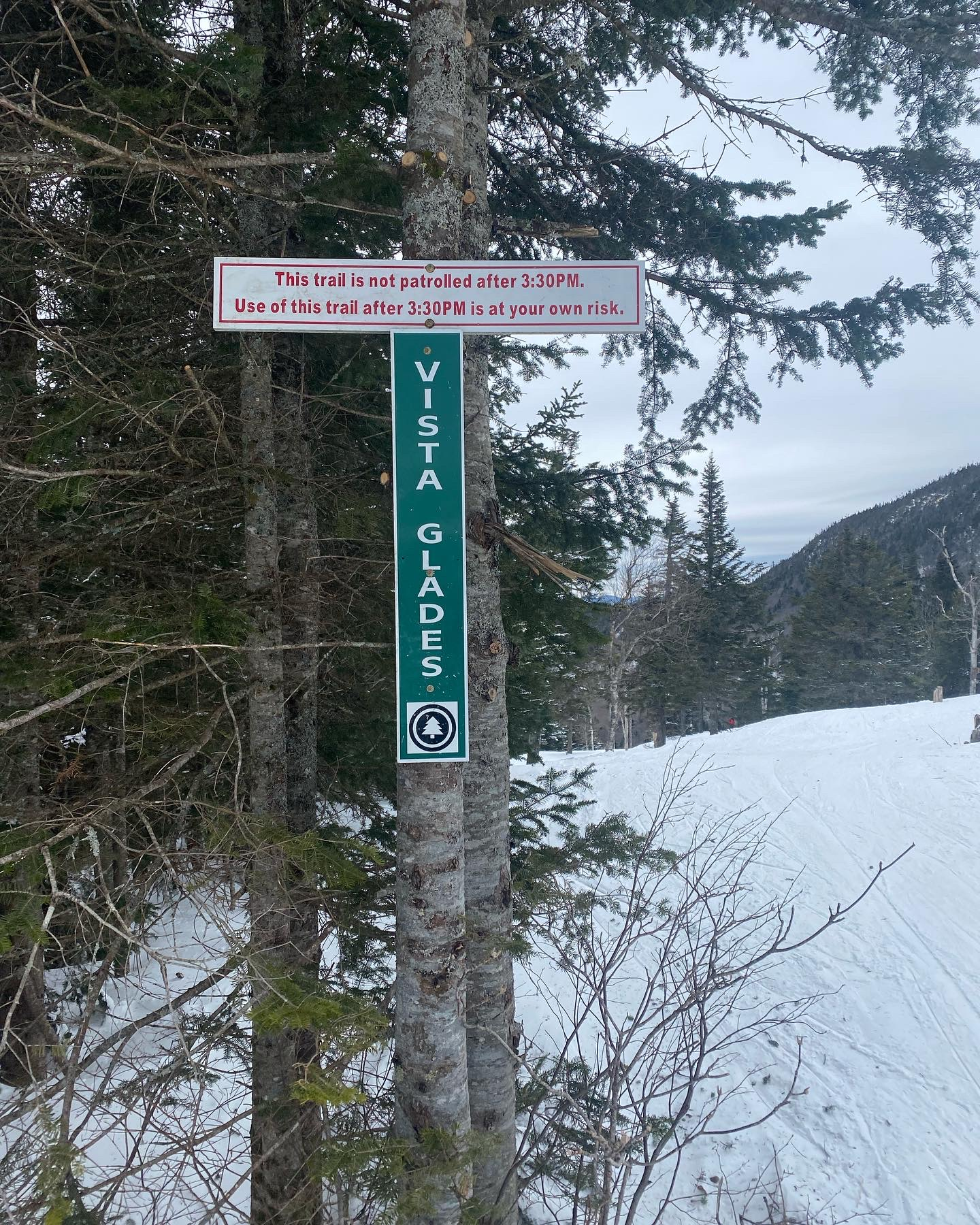
Entrance to "Vista Glades" at Bolton Valley Vermont. Notice the tree in the classification marker.

Glade skiing is inherently more dangerous than skiing on trails and usually reserved for experts, though moderate glade terrain exists. Hazards such as cliffs or streams may or may not be blocked off by ski patrol. Other dangers include tree wells, logs, stumps, concealed root systems, and the trees themselves. Equipment required includes a ski helmet, ski goggles, and gloves, all to protect against the trees and underbrush.

Ski resorts may have defined glade trails, ungroomed glade areas, or boundary-to-boundary policies.

== History ==
The first glade skiing in the eastern United States was on Mount Mansfield, in Vermont. Cut by the Civilian Conservation Corps in 1934, The Nose Dive, was a steep, narrow trail, and started with twisting turns. Below these difficult corners, to the left was a patch of skiable trees named the Slalom Glade, which appeared on the trail map in 1940. Then, in 1952, a new run called "The Glade" was cut, with most small trees and bushes being removed. In the early 1960s, more ski resorts added glades, and Glen Ellen, Vermont (now Sugarbush), opened with a glade. Glades are now very common at resorts.
