= Skiing in New Zealand =

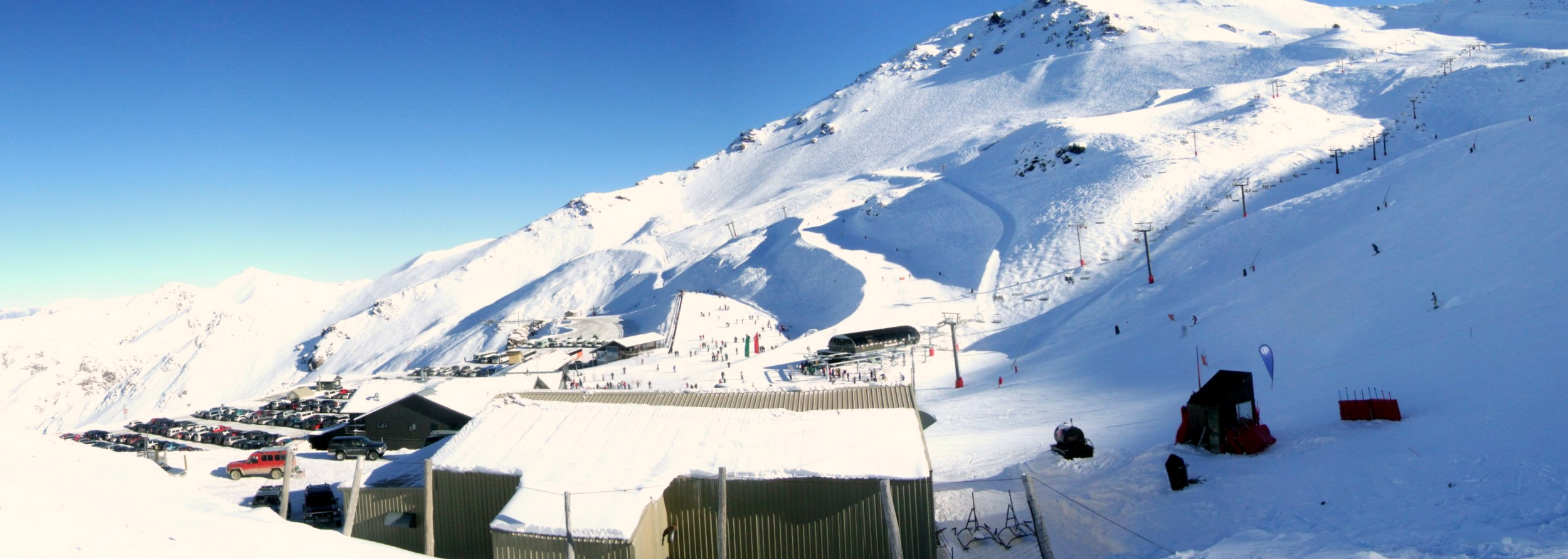
Panoramic view of the base of the Mount Hutt ski field

New Zealand is a major skiing destination in the Southern Hemisphere, due to its high latitude, mountainous terrain, and well-developed economy and tourism industry. The ski season in New Zealand starts in mid June and in good winters can run through to the start of November.

Most of the skifields are in the South Island, with four in the North Island. There are both major commercial resorts, and smaller intrepid and club skifields which provide access to affordable skiing for club members. There are also specialist backcountry skiing areas such as Mount Potts and Invincible Snowfields which provide heliskiing and snowcat skiing for adventure-seekers.

New Zealand has competed at most Winter Olympics since 1952, when Sir Roy McKenzie led a team. In 1992 Annelise Coberger became the first person from the Southern Hemisphere to win a medal at the Winter Olympics when she won silver in the slalom at Albertville in France.

Other forms of skiing that New Zealand is known for include heli-skiing and kite-skiing. Snowkiting, while a relative new sport, has an avid following in New Zealand, with a festival in Wānaka held annually.

Aoraki / Mount Cook is the highest mountain in New Zealand, reaching a height of 3,754 metres (12,316 ft). It lies in the Southern Alps, the mountain range which runs the length of the South Island; it is a popular tourist destination.

== Gallery ==
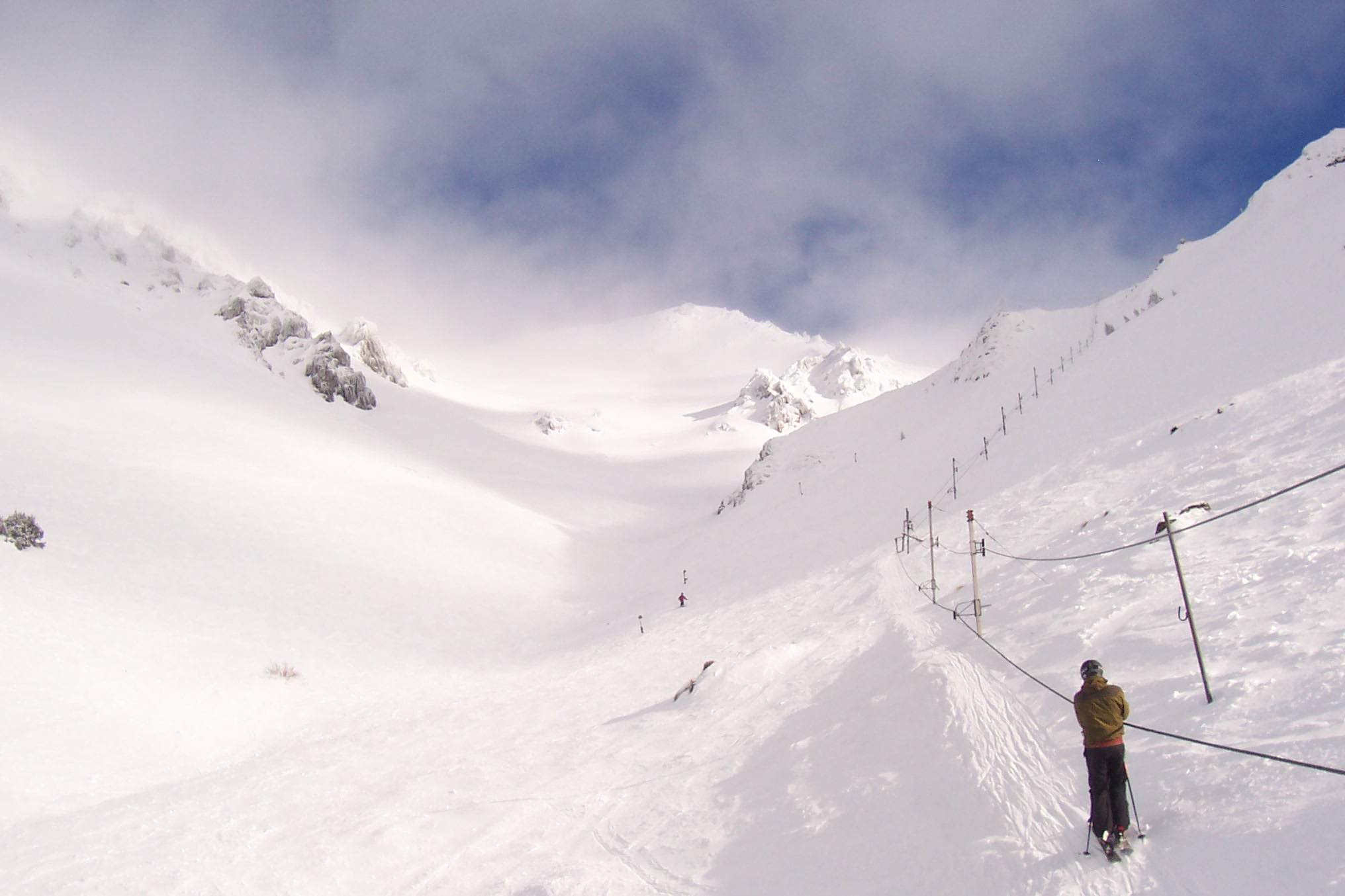
View up the valley at Craigieburn Valley Ski field

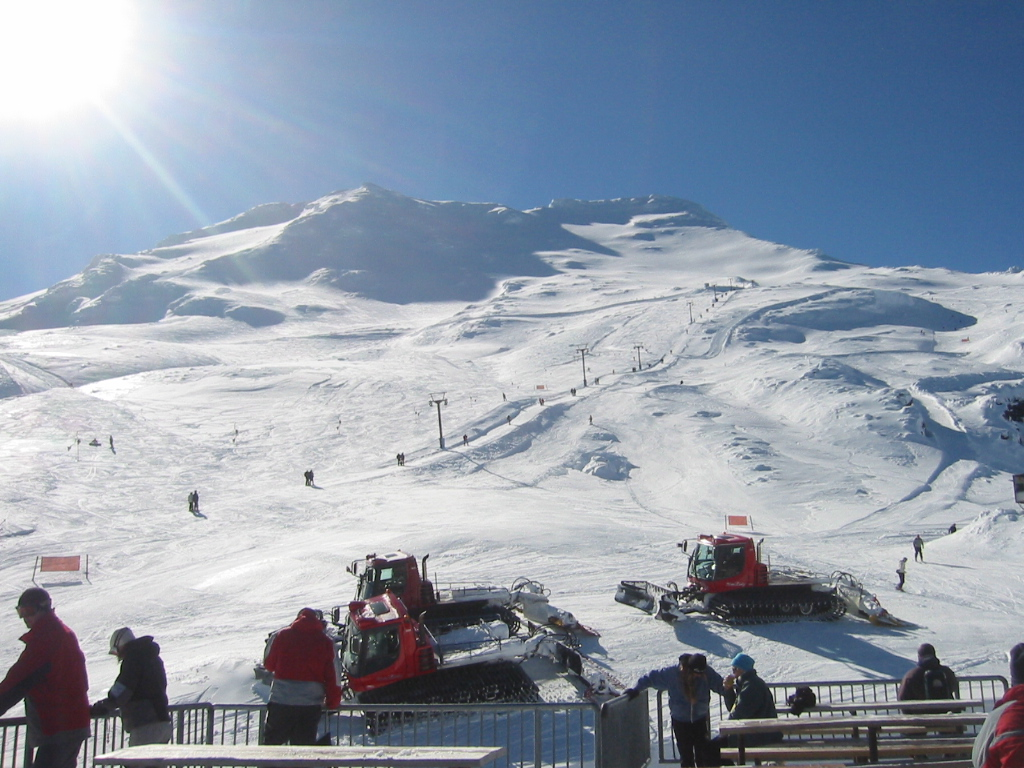
Turoa

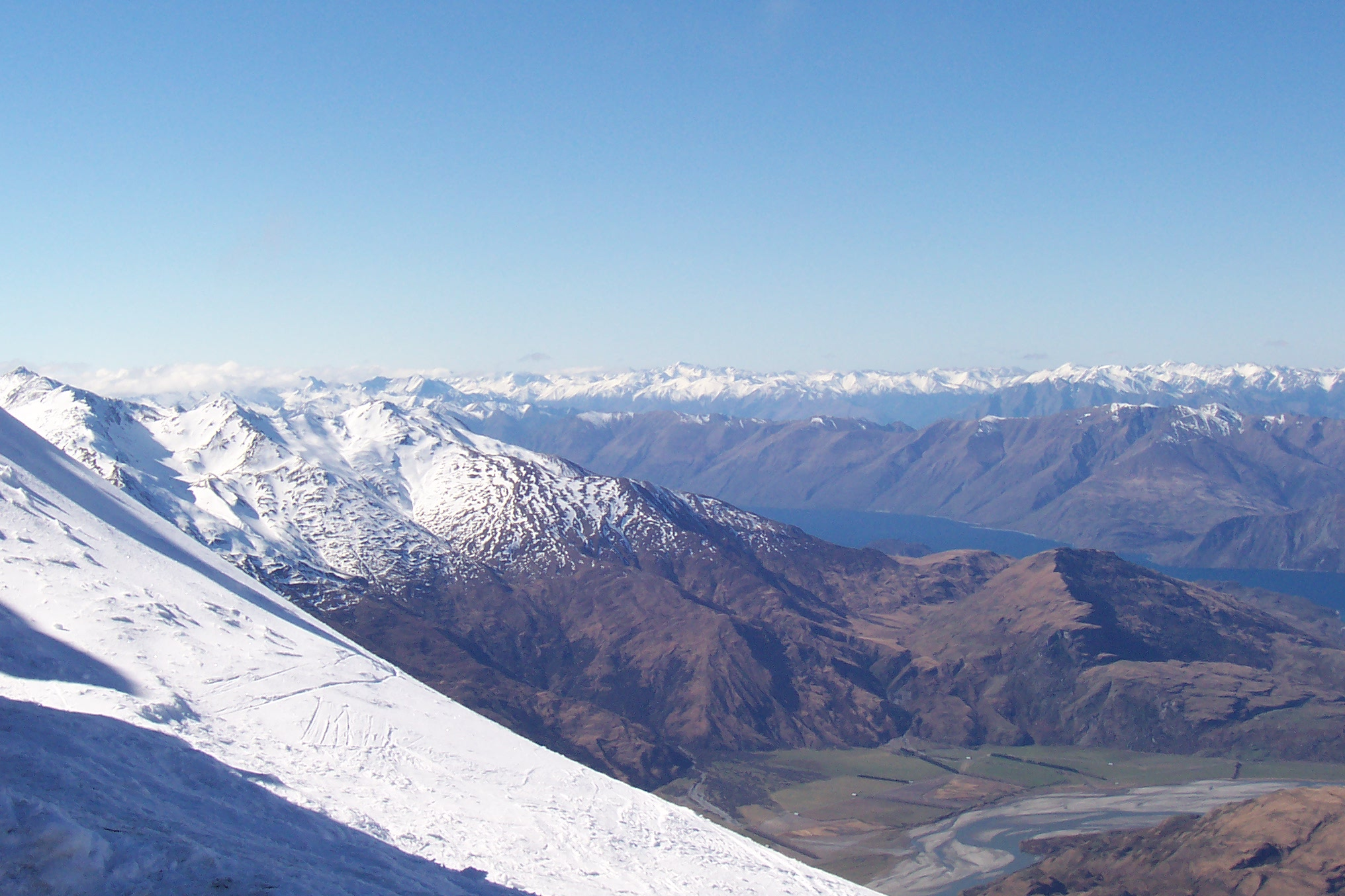
Treble Cone view

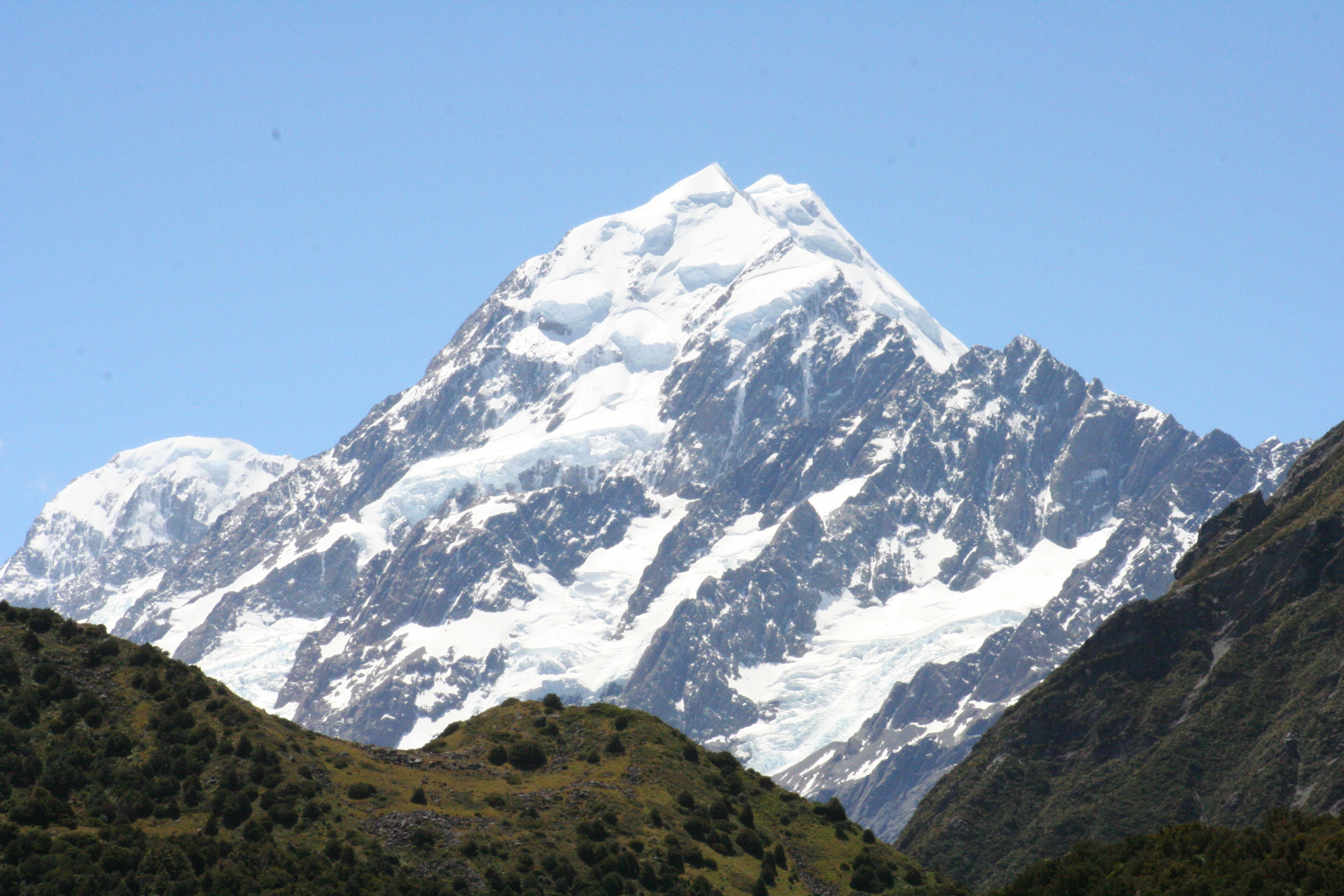
New Zealand's highest mountain, Aoraki / Mount Cook, seen from Kea Point walkway. The mountain to the left is Mount Hicks.

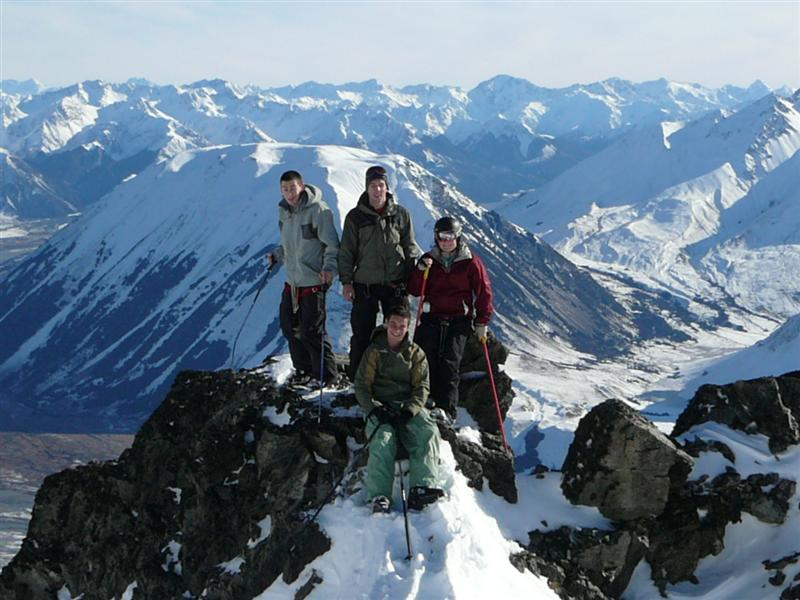
New Zealand skifields from Mount Olympus Ski Area.

== See also ==
- List of ski areas and resorts in New Zealand
- Club skifield
