= Utsav Pathak =

Nepalese skier and sports promoter

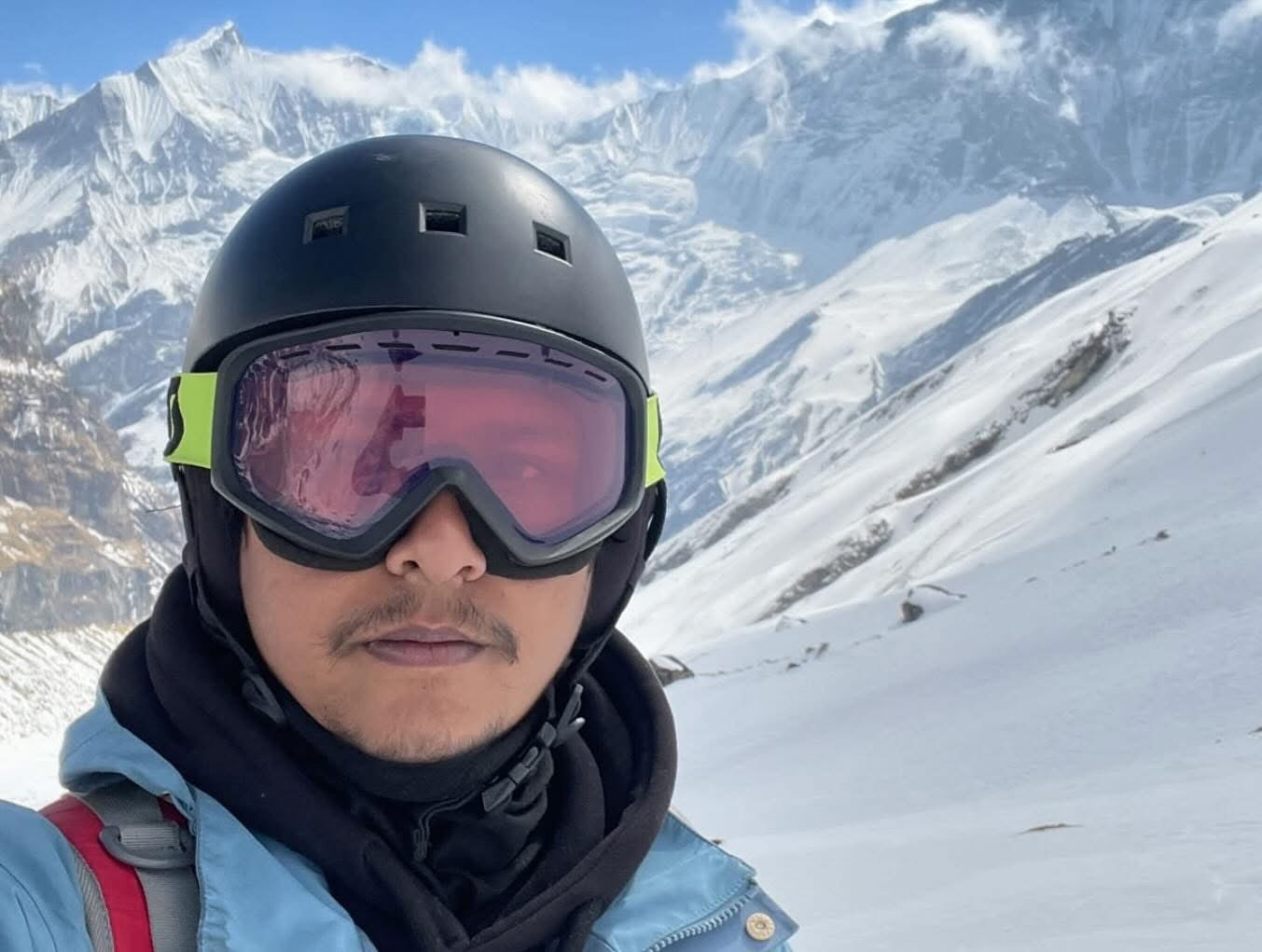
- Utsav Pathak in Annapurna Sanctuary to Ski

Personal information
- Nationality: Nepali
- Born: Dolakha, Nepal
- Education: Bachelor in Travel and Tourism Management
- Years active: 2016-Present

Utsav Pathak is a Nepalese skier, snow sports promoter and organizational leader, best known as the president and founder of Ski and Snowboarding Foundation Nepal (NFSS), a non profit organization focused on the development of skiing and snowboarding in Nepal. His work is associated with the early institutional growth of snow sports and ski tourism in the country.

In 2016, at about 20 years old, Pathak tried skiing for the first time — a sport he had only known through media. That experience helped solidify his conviction that skiing could become more than a novelty in his home country.
