= Nordic combined =

Winter sport combining the events of cross-country skiing and ski jumping

- Highest governing body: International Ski Federation
- First played: 1892, Holmenkollen Ski Festival, Oslo

Characteristics
- Team members: Individuals or groups
- Mixed-sex: no

Presence
- Olympic: 1924–2026

Nordic combined is a winter sport in which athletes compete in cross-country skiing and ski jumping. The Nordic combined at the Winter Olympics has been held since the first Winter Olympics in 1924, while the FIS Nordic Combined World Cup has been held since 1983. Many Nordic combined competitions use the Gundersen method, where placement in the ski jumping segment results in time (dis)advantages added to the contestant's total in the cross-country skiing segment (e.g. the ski jumping winner starts the cross-country skiing race at 00:00:00 while the one with the lowest jumping score starts with the longest time penalty).

== History ==
The first major competition was held in 1892 in Oslo at the first Holmenkollen ski jump. King Olav V of Norway was an able jumper and competed in the Holmenkollen Ski Festival in the 1920s. Nordic combined was in the 1924 Winter Olympics and has been on the program ever since. Until the 1950s, the cross-country race was held first, followed by the ski jumping. This was reversed as the difference in the cross-country race tended to be too big to overcome in ski jumping. The sport has been dominated by the Norwegians, supported by the Finns. It was not until 1960 that the Nordic grip on this discipline was broken when West German Georg Thoma won the gold medal at the 1960 Winter Olympics.

It was decided in early-November 2016 that women's competitions were to be established on FIS-level starting during the second half of the 2010s with inclusion at world championships starting in 2021 and at the Olympic Winter Games in 2022. The Olympic debut for women in 2022 was cancelled in July 2018 by the IOC. In May 2018 the FIS Congress made several decisions regarding the inclusion of women in the sport of Nordic Combined. At the 2022 and 2026 Winter Olympics, Nordic combined was the only sport with exclusively men's events. As of 2019, women have been officially included in FIS Junior World Championships. 2021 marked the start of the FIS World Championship program for women (senior level). 2018 marked the second year of the Continental Cup program for women, which will include a total of 12 events. On July 7, 2026, the International Olympic Committee decided to drop Nordic combined from the programme for the 2030 Winter Olympics, citing a lack of popularity and a limited number of participating nations.

== Competition ==
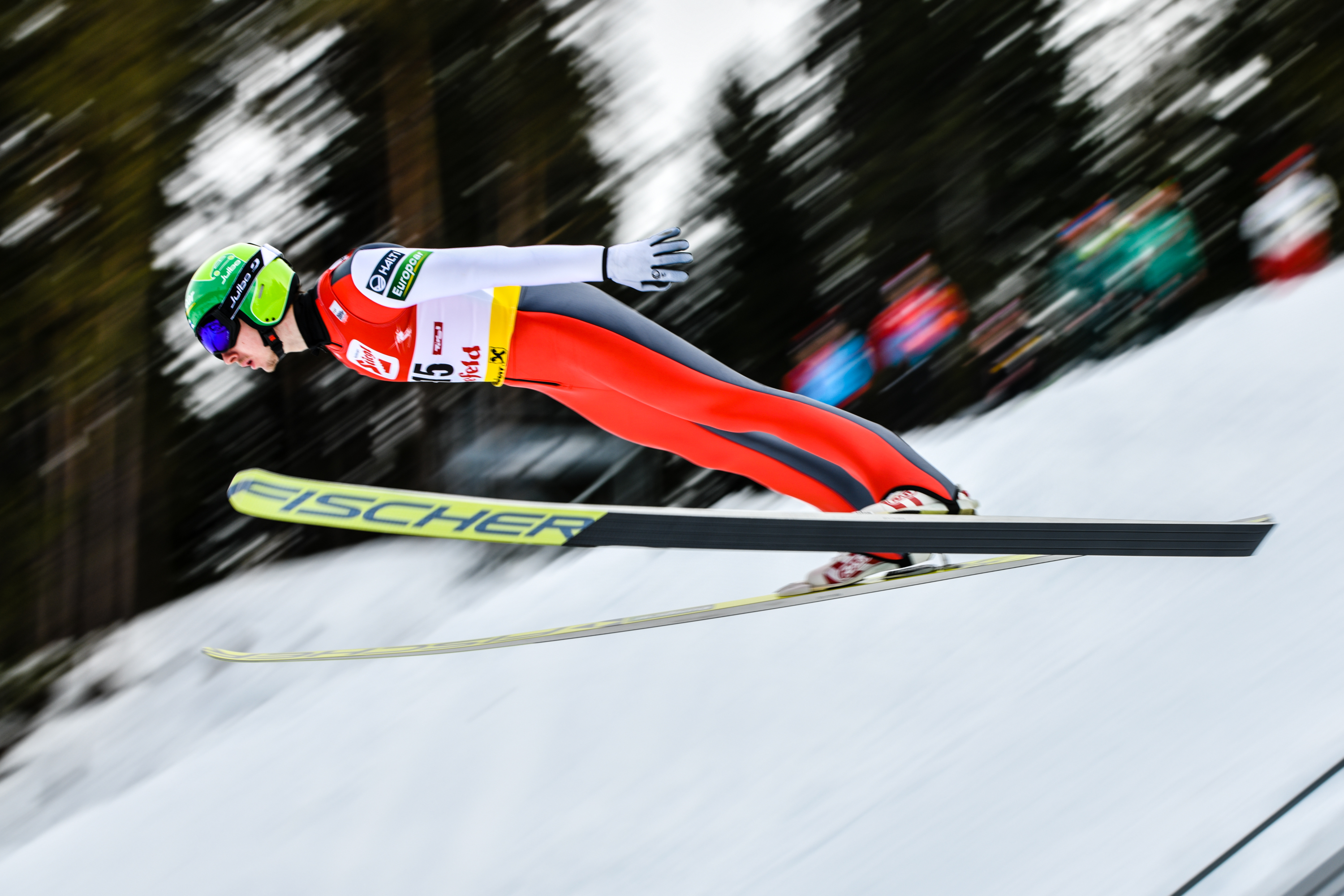
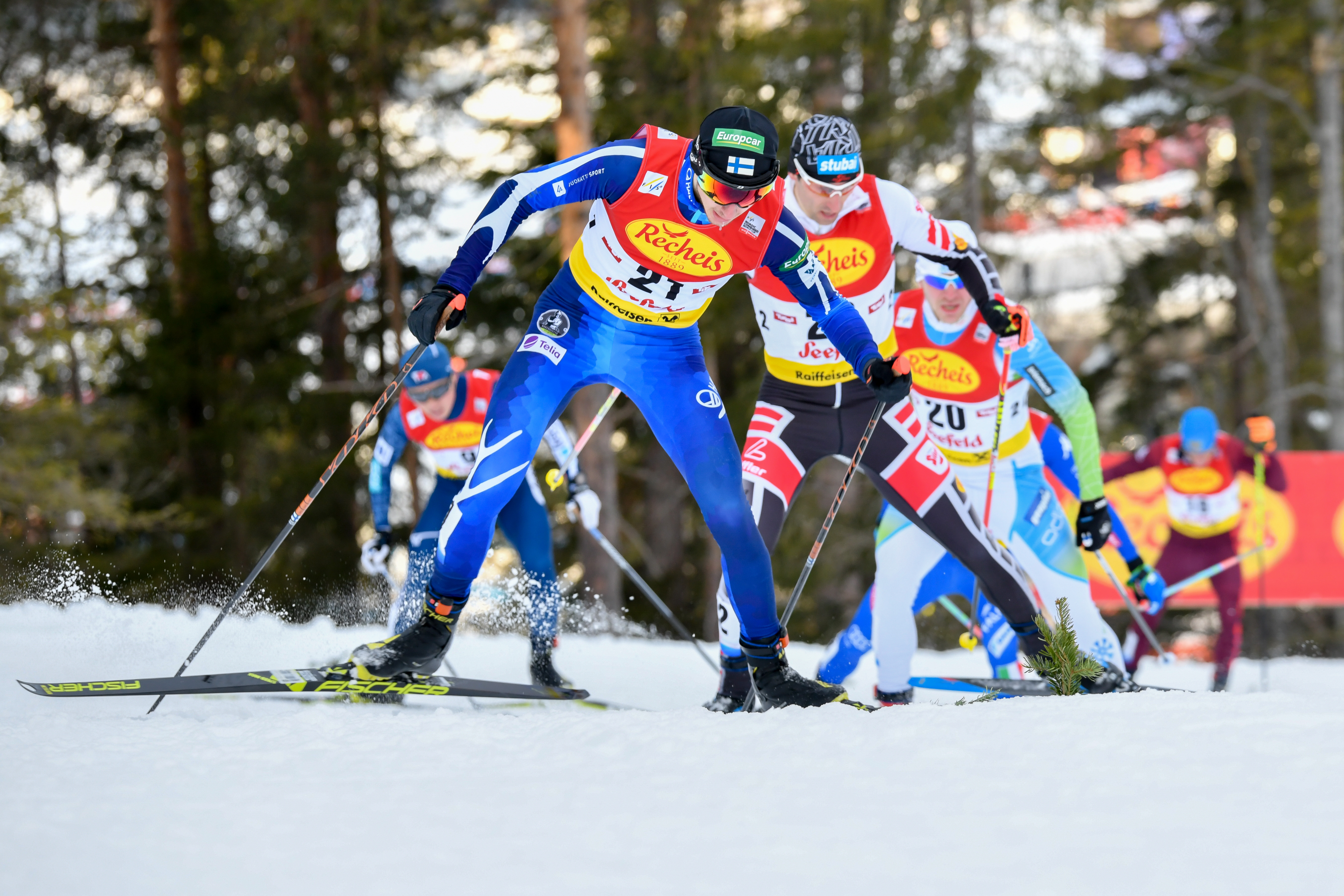
Competitions held in Seefeld during the 2017–18 World Cup.

Formats and variations currently used in the World Cup are:

- Individual Gundersen: competition starts with one competition jump from a normal or large hill. Later on the same day, the 10 km (6.21 mi) cross-country race takes place. The winner starts at 00:00:00 and all other athletes start with time disadvantages according to their jumping score. The first to cross the finish line is the winner. A variation of this is the Final Individual Gundersen, consisting of two jumps and 15 km (9.32 mi) of cross-country skiing in free technique.
- Nordic Combined Triple (2013-2024): introduced in the 2013–14 FIS Nordic Combined World Cup, it features three different events on three days and one overall winner who is awarded extra World Cup points and prize money:
  - Day 1: 1 jump & 10 km (6.21 mi) Prologue
  - Day 2: 1 jump & 15 km (9.32 mi) Individual Gundersen (Top 50 from Day 1's competition)
  - Day 3: 2 jumps & 20 km (12.43 mi) Final Individual Gundersen (Top 30 from Day 2's competition)
- Nordic Combined Triple (2025-): In the 2024-2025 FIS Nordic Combined World Cup the Nordic Combined Triple format changed to include a Mass Start and a Compact competition:
  - Day 1: Mass-Start (10 km M / 5 km W & 1 jump)
  - Day 2: Individual Compact ( 7.5 km M / 5 km W & 1 jump)
  - Day 3: Individual Gundersen ( 12.5 km M / 7.5 km W & 1 jump)
- Team Event: introduced in the 1980s, one team consists of four athletes who have one competition jump each. The total score of all four athletes determines the time disadvantages for the start of the ensuing 5 km (3.11 mi) cross-country race. The first team to cross the finish line wins.
- Mixed Team Event: Introduced in the 2022-2023 FIS Nordic Combined World Cup ahead of the 2023 FIS Nordic World Ski Championships, one team consist of two women and two men who have one competition jump each. The total score of all four athletes determines the time disadvantages for the start of the ensuing relay where women race a 2.5 km loop while men race a 5 km loop. The first team to cross the finish line wins.
- Team Sprint: teams consist of two athletes each. In the ski jumping part, every athlete makes one competition jump like in the Individual Gundersen or Team Event formats and the time behind for the start of the successive cross-country race. The team to arrive first at the finish line wins the competition.
- Mass Start: the only format in which the cross-country part takes place before the ski jumping. All competitors start into a 10 km (6.21 mi) for men or 5 km for women cross-country race in free technique at the same time. The final cross-country times are then converted into points for the ski jumping part. The winner is determined in a points-based system. The Nordic Combined World Cup saw the return of the mass start format in 2018, following a ten-year hiatus.
- Individual Compact: introduced November 2023 combines one jump and a 7.5 km (4.66 mi) for men or 5 km for women race with a fixed start time disadvantage based on the jump ranking: 2nd +6 seconds, 3rd +12, 4th +17, 5th +22, …, 34th-36th +85, 37th and others +90.

Included in the rules but currently not used in World Cup:

- Penalty Race: instead of adding a time disadvantage, distance is added to the cross-country part.

Events in the Olympics are: the men's sprint K120 individual, ski jumping K90 (70m), and Team/4x5km.. There is no women's Nordic Combined at the Olympics.

=== Gundersen method ===
The Gundersen method was developed by Gunder Gundersen, a Nordic combined athlete from Norway, and was first used in the 1980s. In it, the ski jumping portion comes first, and points in the ski jump determine when individuals start the cross-country skiing portion, which is a pursuit race, so that whoever crosses the finish line first wins the competition. The system is now also used in the modern pentathlon in which the start times of the final event (a cross-country run) are staggered so that the first to cross the finish line is the winner of the entire event. World Athletics announced on 7 December 2018 that the 2020 World Under-20 Athletics Championship will adopt the Gundersen method for the decathlon and heptathlon for the final event. A similar system was used in professional golf's Tour Championship from 2019 until 2024; it was dropped due to fan and player perceptions that it was gimmicky and unfair.

Initially put in at the FIS Nordic World Ski Championships 1985 and at the 1988 Winter Olympics, the event point-time differential has been adjusted many times at the Winter Olympics through 2010. The table below is one point difference at the ski jump equaling a specific number of seconds between skiers or teams at the start of the cross country portion of the event. The point-time differential has been unchanged since October 2008.

Winter Olympic Games	Individual	Team
1988	6.7	5
1992	6.7	5
1994	6.5	5
1998	6	3
2002	5	1.5
2006	4	1
2010	4	1.33

== Equipment ==
- Ski bindings: secure only the toe of the boot to the ski. In cross-country, it must be placed so that not more than 57% of the entire ski length is used as the front part. In jumping, a cord or aluminum post attaches the heel of the boot to the ski to prevent tips from dropping and/or wobbling of skis during flight.
- Ski boot
  - For jumping, high-backed, flexible yet firm boots with a low cut at the front, designed to allow the skier to lean forward during flight.
  - For cross-country a skating boot is used.
- Ski suit and helmet
- Skis: jumping skis may have a length of a maximum 145% of the total body height of the competitor. Cross-country skis may be up to 2 meters long.
- Ski poles
- Ski wax: glide wax for speed is used in both types, and kick wax is used in cross-country.

== Health risks ==
Because it's a combination of cross country and ski jumping, the health risks in Nordic combined, including injuries and the risk of eating disorders, are similar to them. The Swiss athlete Matthias Lötscher for example suffered serious spinal injuries and a paralysis of the leg after an accident at the hill of Kandersteg. His countryman Pascal Müller suffered from an eating disorder.
