= Ski sickness =

Form of motion sickness

Ski sickness or Häusler's disease is a form of motion sickness which some skiers develop when weather conditions are bad. Poor visibility in heavy fog can bring on the condition as well as psychological factors such as fear of heights or fear of mountains. High speed and falling may also contribute as when descending rapidly atmospheric pressure changes in the ear from high to low altitude. Symptoms are similar to other sicknesses brought about by motion and include: dizziness, headaches and nausea and in more extreme cases vomiting.

In whiteout conditions, the brain is unable to determine orientation or movement accurately. The condition is caused by the rhythmic turning motion of skiing and other effects such as a reduction in sensory feedback from constrained feet. In 1995 Rudolf Häusler of the University of Berne was the first described to have this disease. Ski sickness could affect up to 10% of skiers. Professor Häusler found that over-the-counter prescription medicines for motion sickness relieved the symptoms for most affected people.
