= Ski Canada =

Canadian skiing magazine

Ski Canada is a Canadian special-interest consumer magazine focused on alpine (downhill) skiing. First launched in 1972 as Ski Canada Journal, the publication began in a newspaper-style format with a primary emphasis on ski racing. It was founded by Col. Terry Whelpton and transitioned to a magazine format and the name Ski Canada in 1974 (ISSN 0702-701X).

The magazine has undergone several changes in ownership over its history. In 1979, it was acquired by Maclean Hunter Ltd., one of Canada's largest publishing companies at the time. In 1990, the title was sold to Solstice Publishing Inc., a Toronto-based independent publisher. In 2022, publishing responsibilities were transferred from Solstice to Wigwag Media Holdings Inc.—first appearing as the listed publisher in the Fall 2022 issue (Vol. 51, No. 2).

Over the decades, the editorial focus of Ski Canada has broadened from competitive ski coverage to encompass a wide range of topics related to alpine skiing. These include gear reviews and annual ski tests, resort and travel features, instructional content, interviews, ski culture commentary, and adventure skiing.

The magazine is known for its striking photography that often features skiers navigating extreme terrain or immersed in deep powder. In academic discourse, Ski Canada has been analyzed for its portrayal of skiing culture. Sociologist Mark Stoddart described the magazine’s visual and narrative framing as contributing to the construction of alpine skiing as a domain of “athletic, risk-seeking masculinity,” and characterized its imagery as the skiing equivalent of soft-core pornography due to its idealized depictions of nature, adventure, and performance.

Ski Canada publishes regular print issues and online content tailored to both recreational and expert skiers.
