= Jump turn =

Skiing technique

A skier using a jump turn in a couloir

A jump turn is a skiing technique used in steep, narrow areas - such as a couloir - that do not permit a full parallel or carving turn. Jump turns involve pole planting followed by a quick hop that reverses the skiers' direction.
