= Ski and Snowboarding Foundation Nepal =

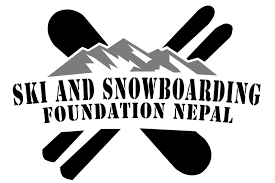
- Founder: Utsav Pathak
- Website: skisnowboardnepal.org

Ski and Snowboarding Foundation Nepal is non profit and non governmental organisation established in 2016 with the aim of developing skiing and snowboarding culture in Nepal. Since its establishment, the foundation has organized events, training, research and camps in different places of Nepal. Ski and Snowboarding Foundation Nepal installed the first ski lift in Nepal in Kalinchowk. Ski and Snowboarding Foundation Nepal was founded by Utsav Pathak and Julious Seidenador in 2016. Ski and Snowboarding Foundation Nepal has been working from Humla to Solukhumbu. They have also been featured in many international magazines and have been nominated for UIAA 2022 Mountain Protection Award.

Ski and Snowboarding Foundation is also known as NFSS among ski and snowboarding community in Nepal
