= Ski season =

Time of year when skiing is feasible at a resort

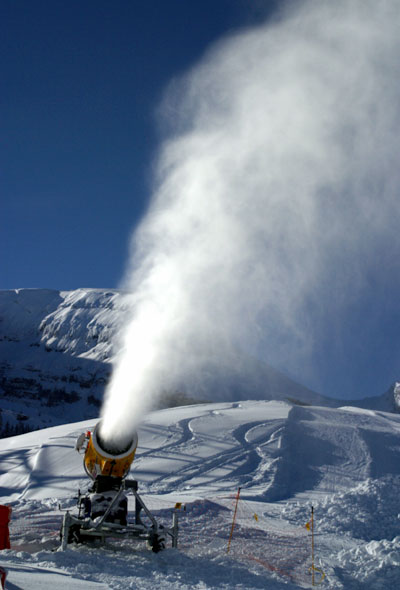
The introduction of artificial snowmaking with snow guns in the late 1950s revolutionized the ski industry.

A ski season is a period when skiing, snowboarding and other alpine sports are viable in a ski resort. The season corresponds to when ski lifts are running and lift passes are available. Depending on the latitude and altitude of the resort, the season will typically run from early to mid-winter until mid- to late spring. The snow season can change drastically from year to year and mountain to mountain. Ideally, the season will be over before the thaw begins.

== Peak season ==
A typical ski season has three stages, and therefore three levels of lift ticket pricing:

- Off-peak, at the very beginning and ending of the season, when the number of lifts open is limited and the snow cover in the lower sections of the mountain is typically patchy.
- Shoulder, during which the mountain is entirely snow-covered but lift pass sales are not sufficiently lucrative to justify opening all lifts or areas of the mountain.
- Peak, during which all lifts and most if not all runs are open. These periods are usually at the height of the season or during school or public holidays.

== Extending the season ==
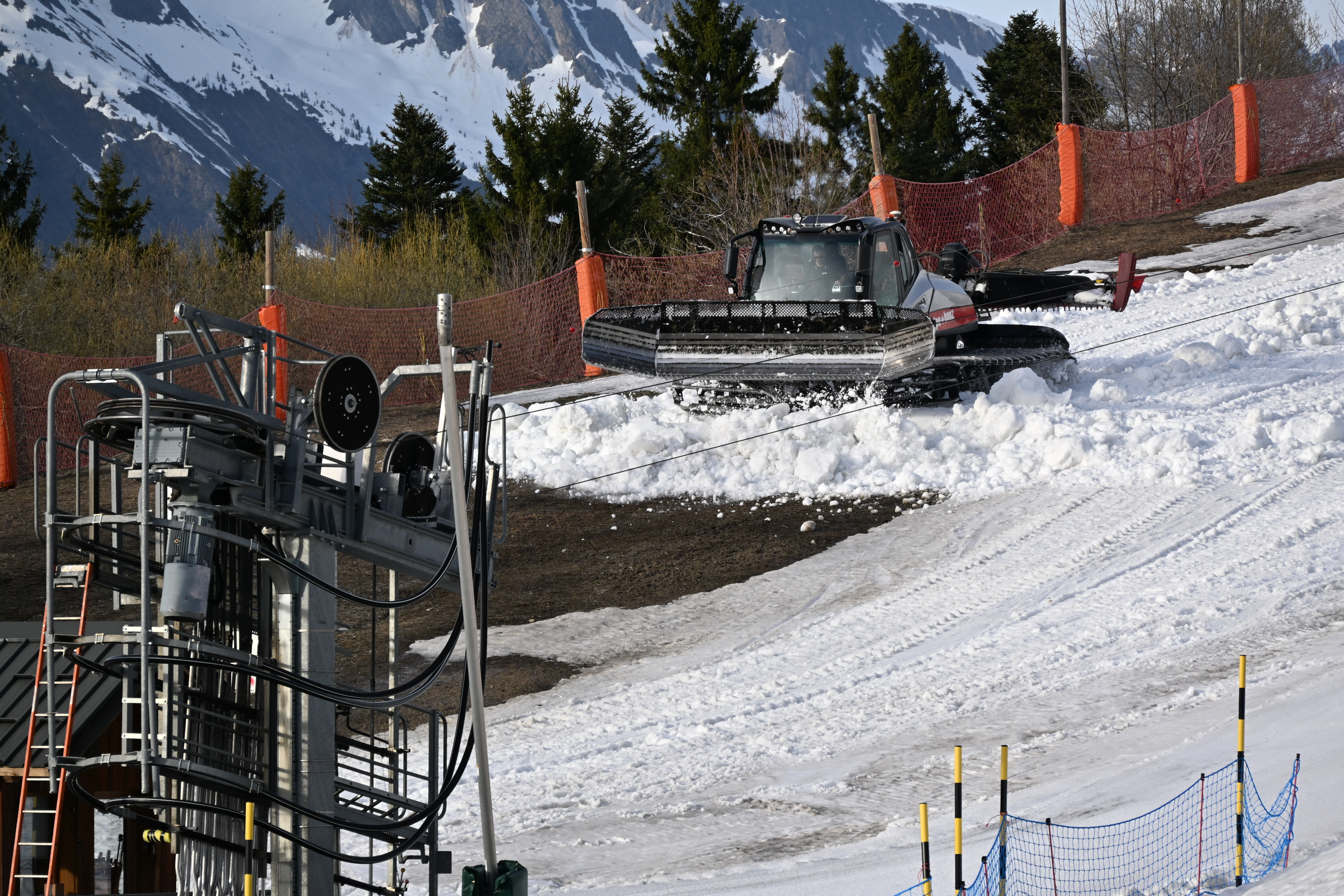
A snow groomer redistributes snow from higher up to reopen a low-lying ski run, in April 2026 in Villard-Reculas, France.

The introduction of artificial snowmaking with snow guns in the late 1950s revolutionized the ski industry, drastically changing the ski season for every climate. Snowmakers became a popular investment for large ski resorts in the 1960s, enhancing the ability to maintain snow in places where snow didn't naturally occur very often. By the start of the 1970s, snowmaking technology had progressed far enough to see ski resorts remain open in places that can regularly see less than three feet of natural snowfall a year. Ski resorts tend to rely on artificial snow making even more as climate change shortens the window for natural snowfall.

== In the U.S. ==
Typically, in the United States, a ski season lasts from late November to early April, however some larger resorts in Colorado and California are known to continue skiing as late as the 4th of July. One of the most well-known mountains in the US for almost year-round skiing is the Timberline Lodge ski area on Mount Hood. With a base elevation at 4,540 and a peak elevation of 8,540, it is not the highest elevation ski resort in the western United States. Its unique climate can bring an average of 400 inches of wet heavy snow, also known as Cascade concrete. The wet heavy snow on Palmer Glacier takes a lot longer to melt than dry fluffy snow that the central Rocky Mountains are known for.

Some ski resorts, like the small Cataloochee Ski Area found in western North Carolina, rely almost entirely on artificial snowmaking to stay open. With an average annual snowfall total of only around 35 inches (most of which occurs in January and February) Cataloochee is still able to open up around November 20 and maintain snow until March 25. Even in bad snow years thanks to heavy investments in snowmaking technology, Cataloochee can open with no natural snowfall and will often be open for months before the first real snowstorm occurs. With a base elevation of 4,660 and a peak of 5,400, it is the second highest ski resort on the entire east coast, second only to its neighbor 2 hours to the north, Beech Mountain. Both of which are in the high southern Appalachian Smokey mountain range. It is because of these high elevations that they are able to operate, with the valleys around the resorts seeing much less, if any snowfall.
