= Heliskiing =

Skiing using a helicopter

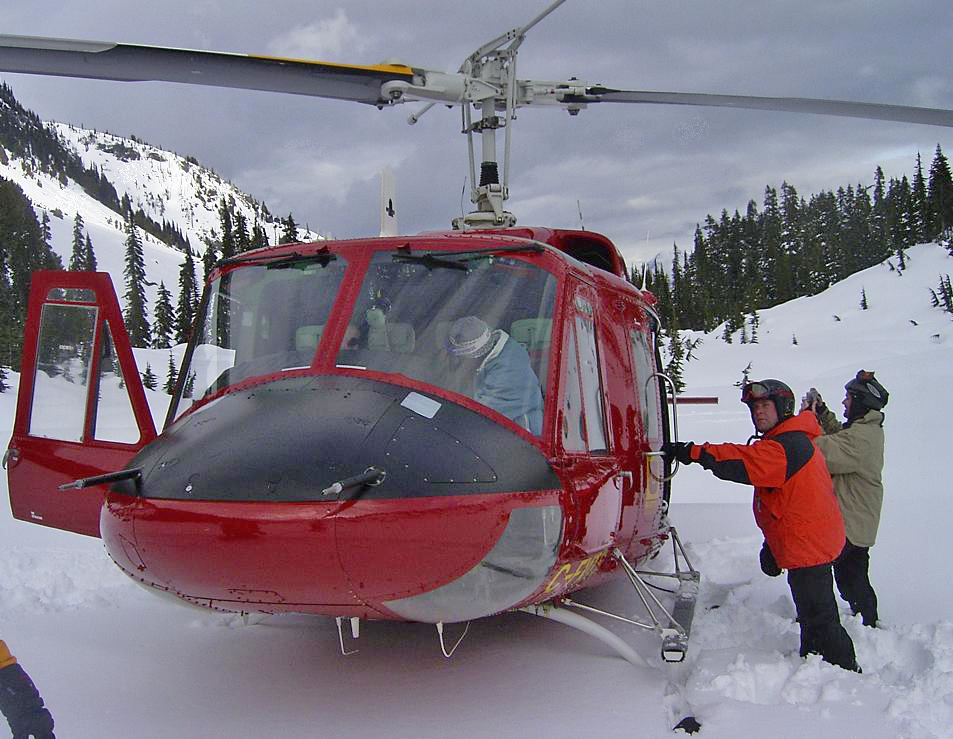

Heli-skiing is off-trail, downhill skiing or snowboarding where the skier reaches the top of the mountain by helicopter, instead of a ski lift.

== History ==
The earliest record of heli-skiing is that of Canadian Philippe Bieler, who in the summer of 1953, while working near the Nechako reservoir in British Columbia, was dropped from the newly licensed Bell helicopter 47D-1 for a ski run. In the late 1950s, helicopters were used in Alaska and Europe to transport skiers to remote places. But the idea of commercialising heliskiing first came from a Canadian geologist Art Patterson. Patterson also used helicopters for his works during summer, however, he noticed that during winter time there was no use for the helicopters. Since he was an enthusiastic skier, he thought about using the helicopters to transport skiers to the top of the mountains. He teamed up with Hans Gmoser who was an experienced mountain guide and created a business together. They charged $20 for their first day of heliskiing, however, due to unfavorable weather conditions and a small Bell 47G-2 helicopter, Patterson decided the business is too risky and withdrew from the venture. However, Gmoser continued in the business idea and in 1965 commercialized the activity in Canada by founding CMH, Canadian Mountain Holidays, a heliskiing company which combined lodging, transport and guiding. The biggest growth in heliskiing was in the 1970s and 1980s, when this type of skiing became widely commercialized.

== Safety ==
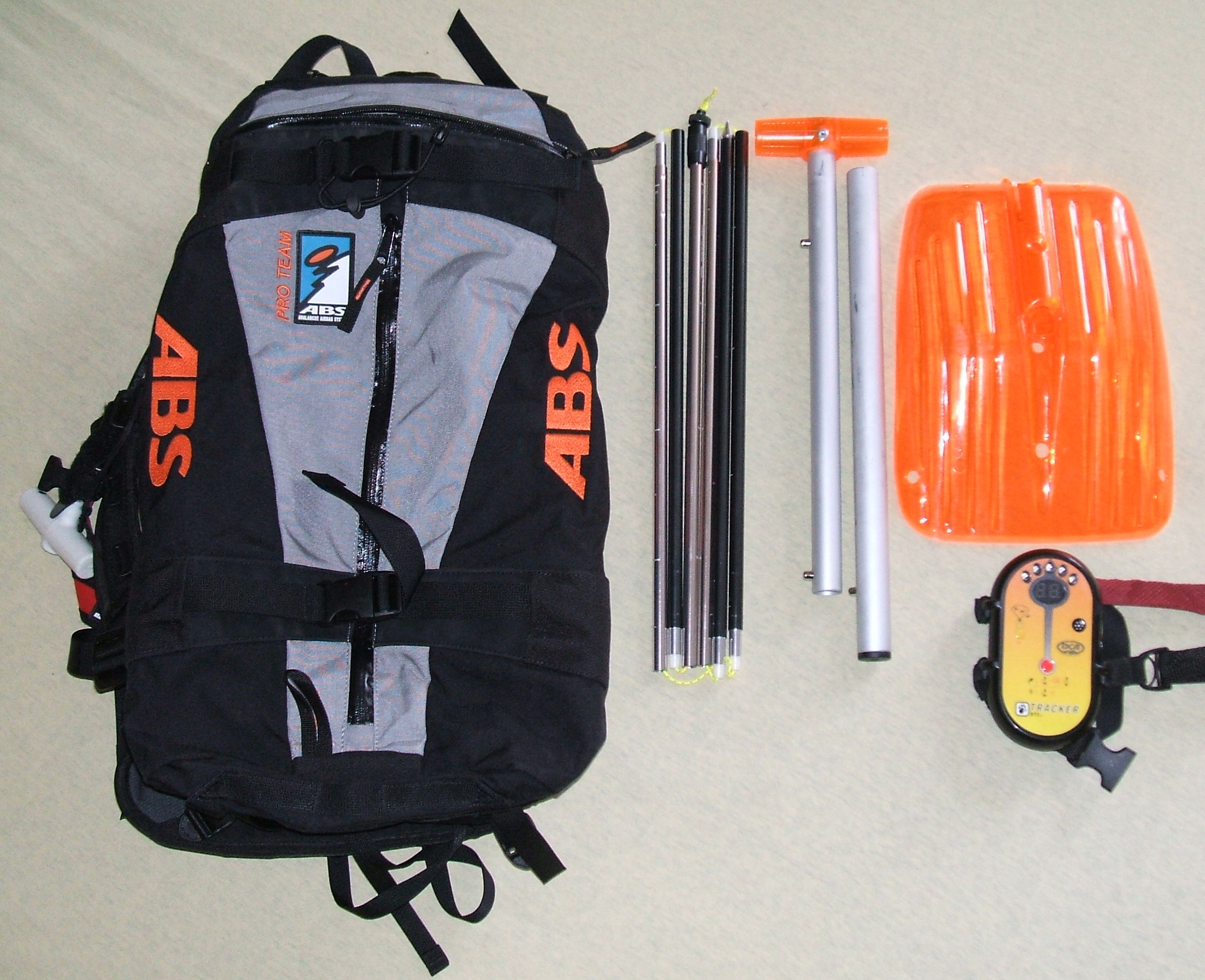
Avalanche backpack, probe, shovel and a transceiver

Heliskiing presents more dangers than conventional slope skiing. A major safety concern while heliskiing is the danger of an avalanche. There are several techniques that increase safety in wild terrain, such as the usage of explosives to intentionally create an avalanche or the more common techniques of avoiding dangerous ski slopes. Another common risk are tree wells. It is standard to use different types of safety equipment, such as avalanche transceivers, probes or shovels, that help to locate and free a person buried under snow. More modern safety equipment is an avalanche airbag, which can be manually triggered when a skier gets into an avalanche. The mechanism located in the skiers backpack then inflates a big airbag around the skiers body, which then lifts the skier to the surface of the avalanche. Another important rule while skiing off trail is to never ski alone, but rather in a group, so in case of an avalanche or other incident there are people who can immediately help the skier. Avalanche safety courses are a common way on how to increase safety, as these courses teach the skier how to read the snow, how to tell which slopes are dangerous and which not, learn how to navigate in terrain, how to predict weather and other skills.

== Locations ==
Most popular heliskiing locations can be found in the European Alps, with the Swiss Zermatt being the most visited location. In Switzerland there are an estimated 15,000 heliskiing flights each year, to 42 landing sites. In Northern America the most popular areas for heliskiing are British Columbia and Alaska. Other popular heliski destinations are Kamchatka in Russia or Hokkaido in Japan. In Turkey, heliskiing is done on the Kaçkar Mountains. Austria allows only one landing site.

== Accessibility ==
There are two main types of heliskiing experience. First one is lodge-based, where skiers live in a lodge in wilderness and do ski trips from there. These packages are usually for 5–7 days and can cost around $10 000. The second option is day heli-skiing, which includes only one day of skiing without accommodation, most usually available during a typical resort-based ski experience. Equipment such as freeride skis, poles and safety gear is usually included in the price.

== Controversy ==
In 2010 Switzerland's major environmental groups, including the Worldwide Fund for Nature, handed a petition with over 15,000 signatures to the Swiss government, demanding a ban on heliskiing. Heliskiing is banned in Germany and was banned in France in 1985.

== Misconceptions ==
A common misconception is that a skier has to jump off the helicopter while it is airborne. However, in a typical heli-ski run the helicopter has a predetermined drop-off location where it lands and allows all members to safely exit the helicopter. Another misconception is that skiers jump off cliffs and ski on steep and dangerous slopes. However, in a typical heli-ski run there are small groups of skiers that have their own guides who know routes that have been chosen in advance and test the snowpack to confirm it is safe. The group can usually choose how challenging they want the run to be.

== See also ==
- Environmental impact of aviation
- Environmental impact of tourism
