= Shin-bang =

Lower-leg discomfort associated with ski boots

Shin-bang is a general sense of discomfort or pain in the lower anterior portion of the tibia that contacts the tongue of a ski boot, especially when pressed against the boot. It should not to be confused with shin-bite, which is a condition where the shin is rubbed raw due to irritation inside of the ski boot.

== Causes of shin-bang ==
There are multiple possible causes of shin-bang. Most notable causes include: ski boots that are too big, skiing in a "back seat" posture, ski boots that are too stiff, aggressive skiing, and landing jumps or drops in a back seat fashion.

Reasons for these causes:

Ski boots that are too big: With ski boots that are too large, one's foot and ankle are able to slide forward and backward. When this motion happens, intermittent contact between the shin and the tongue or upper cuff of the ski boot takes place. This intermittent contact usually continues through the duration of one's ski day especially on aggressive terrain that can cause the skier to migrate to skiing in the back seat.

Skiing in a back seat posture: Skiing in the back seat, also known as skiing with one's weight behind their feet, places a lot of pressure and strain on their lower legs. The poor skiing form not only intensifies contact with the lower part of one's shin and the boot but it also can strain muscles, only intensifying the soreness.

Ski boots that are too stiff: Skiing in a boot that is too stiff can effectively limit how forward one can get on their skis. With today's more upright ski boot stances, failure to properly flex a boot can almost force a skier into the back seat. When choosing a ski boot flex, make sure you can effectively flex the boot at room temperature, as it will only get stiffer with the onset of colder temperatures. Ideal flex on a four-buckle boot is achieved when the middle buckles come in close proximity to each other but do not touch. Note however that stronger, more aggressive skiers can benefit from a stiffer flex boot especially if they consistently ski in a forward athletic position.

Aggressive skiing: Skiing through rough terrain can cause a lot of shock to one's lower legs. Examples include: bumps in snow which are hard to notice, moguls, hard pack snow, crusty snow conditions, etc.

Landing jumps or drops in the back seat: This action causes muscles and tendons to stretch beyond their conditioned level. In other cases, the force of landing in the back seat can cause stress fractures in the tibia. These fractures are most likely caused from the tibia bending as a result of the upper cuff of the ski boot acting as a fulcrum for the upper body. Typically this can be the cause of chronic shin-bang.

== Remedies for shin-bang ==
There are many purported remedies for shin-bang. The use of nonsteroidal anti-inflammatory drugs such as Ibuprofen may help some athletes ski through the discomfort, but rest is ultimately the most effective remedy. A properly fitting and flexing boot is crucial to preventing this condition. In addition to this, a post-skiing leg drain can help reduce swelling and refresh the shins.

Straps can be added to a boot's normal power straps to cinch the power strap tighter, compressing the boot liner tighter to the leg. Straps with elastic may allow skiers to stay out of the backseat and dorsiflex more due to the “forgiveness” in the strap.

== See also ==
- Shin splints
