= Pivot turn (skiing) =

Skiing technique

The pivot turn or pivot is a technique of turning in place in skiing. The two types are the tail pivot and tip pivot.

In the tail pivot, e.g., to the left, little turning steps are done to the left while keeping the tails of the skis together in place. Repeat the following two steps until the required amount of turn is reached: step the front of the left ski to the left with its tail in place, bring the right ski to the left ski. The tip pivot is similar, done while keeping the ski tips in place while moving the tails.
