= Lift ticket =

Access voucher for transport

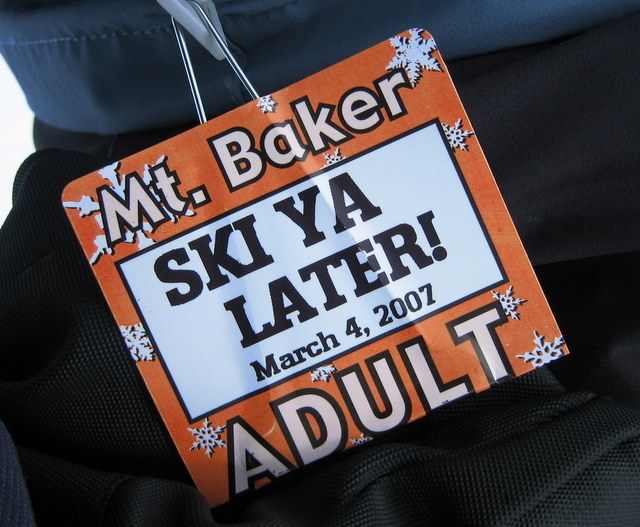
An adhesive paper ski pass, folded over a metal wicket

A lift ticket or lift pass is an identifier usually attached to a skier's or snowboarder's outerwear that indicates they have paid and can ride on the ski lift(s) that transport people and equipment up or down a mountain.

== Types of lift tickets ==
Types of lift tickets may vary by specific number of rides, time period (half day, day, night, multi-day, season), or type of lift. Historically, paper tickets were attached directly to a skier's gear, and dated and/or color-coded for clarity and to ease authentication by lift personnel. Season tickets were more durable, and typically worn round the neck on a lanyard or chain to ease use and re-use. By the 1970s they had gained photos to link the skier to the pass (and prevent pass swapping) and become laminated in transparent plastic. Other forms of ski ticket have undergone a continuous evolution:

=== Evolution ===
Direct application to clothing

Initially, lift tickets were stapled or glued directly to clothing, to prevent ticket holders from transferring lift tickets from one skier to another, thereby depriving ski resorts of revenue. This approach, however, damaged skiers' clothing.

Ticket wicket

Ski resorts (and other venues that issue tickets) commonly use a wicket to secure the ticket (called a "ticket wicket"), a short piece of light wire which loops through the ticket holder's clothing or backpack. The ticket wicket was invented by Killington Ski Resort employee Martin S. "Charlie" Hanley, in 1963, and given its name by his wife Jane. Hanley patented the ticket wicket in Canada and the United States in 1966, and assigned the rights to Killington's parent company, The Sherburne Corporation, for whom he had developed the wicket while on their payroll. The Sherbourne Corporation licensed the ticket wicket to ski areas across the U.S. following a ski operators road show, at which the Hanleys promoted it. Despite quick and widespread adoption of the wicket both domestically and abroad, however, Hanley never made any money off the soon-ubiquitous ticket wicket; an avid skier, he was content to invent something related to the then-nascent sport of downhill skiing. In 1995, John C. Myles, Melisa Syracusa, and Edward M. Friedlander Jr. patented another version of the ticket wicket.

The wicket inspired several innovations to make its use more convenient, such as ski ticket holder "pigtail". In addition, many ski jackets are designed with wickets in mind, providing plastic or cloth loops that allow the attachment of a wicket without interfering with zipper operation.

Zip-tie

Today, although ticket wickets are still widely used, some resorts now use plastic zip-ties rather than metal wires to secure tickets. Unlike a metal wicket, when a paper ticket is torn off a zip tie the tie remains attached. Either system can result in the emergence of the so-called "Ticket Turkey", who leaves tickets from previous ski days and ski areas attached to their gear to impress others. While both systems minimize ticket swapping, neither simplifies the process of checking skiers for legitimate tickets - a process complicated by the proclivity of the "Ticket Turkey". who retain a collection of used ski tickets on their clothing, thereby forcing human ticket checkers "to parse through a collection of tickets to find the current one."

RFID card

The next evolution in the ski ticket was a digital card embedded with a radio-frequency identification (RFID) chip, which was either scanned by a lift-attendant with a handheld reader, or could be read by a sensor at a gate controlling access to a lift - allowing the card to be kept inside a pocket and eliminating a potential hindrance.

The invention of the electronic ski pass is thanks to An Italian company, ALFI of Borgo Ticino (NO), is credited with inventing the electronic ski pass, supplying the first electronic access control system for ski lifts in San Vigilio di Marebbe (Italy) in 1974. The following year this solution was extended to the entire Dolomiti Superski area.

Smartphone

In April 2018, smartphones were used to displace RFID cards by the Italian company BLUETICKETING of Pont Saint Martin (AO).
