= Tree well =

Space around, under a tree that receives less snow

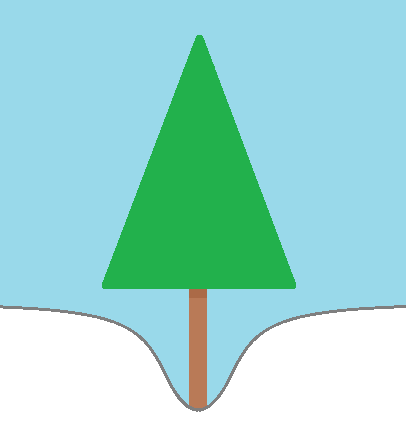
A diagram of a tree well

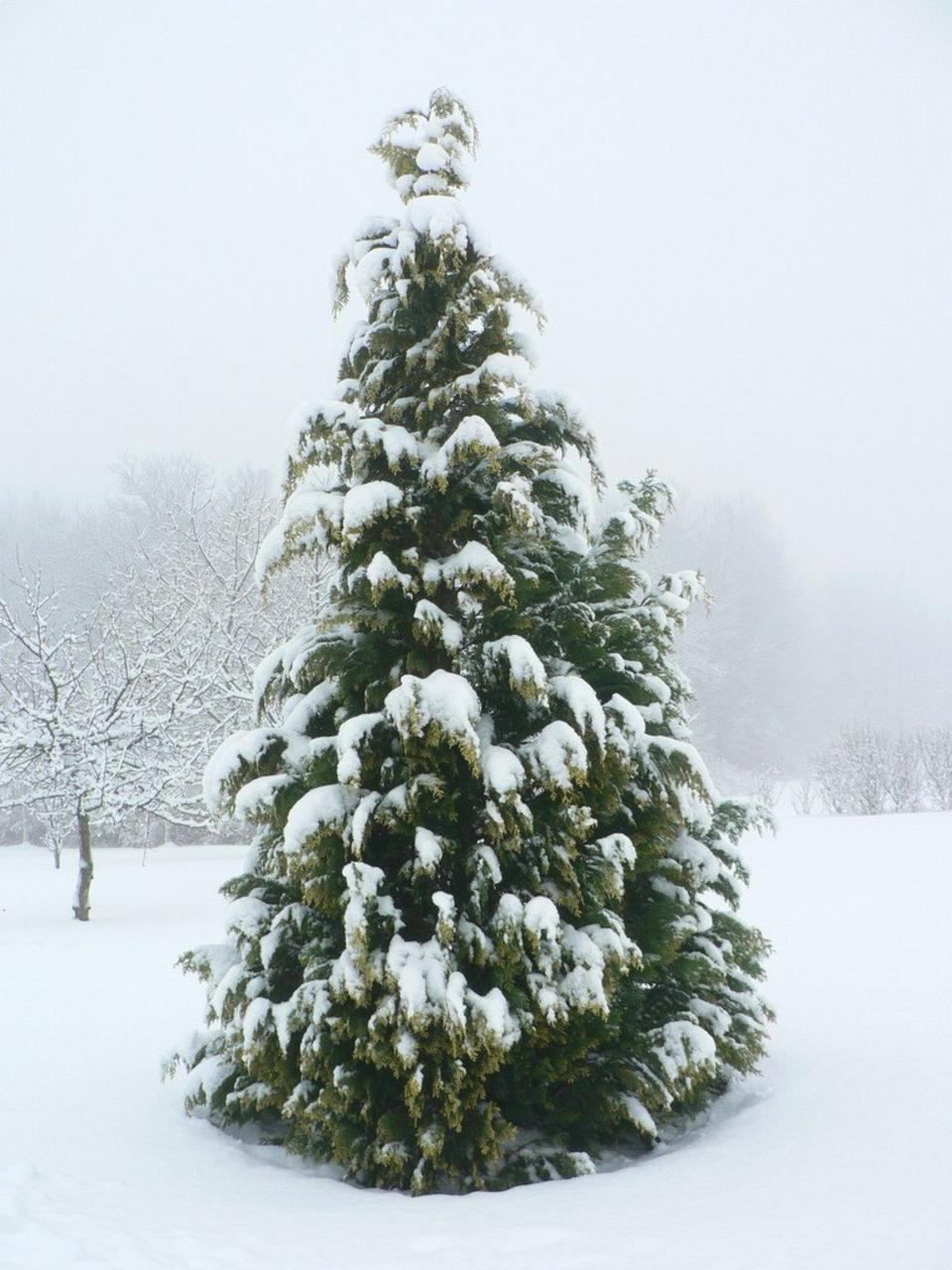
A cypress tree shelters the ground around it, creating a tree well.

A tree well, also known as a spruce trap, is the space around a tree under its branches that does not get the same amount of snow as the surrounding open space. This creates a void or area of loose snow below the branches and around the trunk that is dangerous to any hikers, snowshoers, skiers, snowboarders, and snowmobilers who fall into them. If someone lands in such a well, often as a result of a fall, it can be too deep for them to climb up the surrounding loose snow before they are buried. Making the situation more dangerous, they often fall into the well head-first and as the result of an accident which could leave them injured or unconscious.

== Formation ==
A tree's branches shelter the area around its trunk from snowfall. If the snow is deep enough, there is a significant void or area of loose snow underneath the branches around the trunk. Such wells have been observed as deep as 20 ft (6 m). Similar "wells" can also occur near rocks and along streams.

Tree wells occur outside of groomed trails and represent a significant risk to those who ski or snowboard off-piste, in backcountry areas, but can also be found on the boundaries between groomed and ungroomed areas. The risk of encountering one is greatest during and immediately following a heavy snowstorm.

== Hazard ==
Victims become trapped in tree wells and are unable to free themselves. In two experiments conducted in North America, 90% of volunteers temporarily placed in tree wells were unable to rescue themselves. If the snow is deep enough, the surrounding snow banks can collapse over them, depriving them of air. "If a partner is not there for immediate rescue, the skier or rider may die very quickly from suffocation – in many cases, he or she can die as quickly as someone can drown in water", according to the Tree Well and Snow Immersion Suffocation (SIS) Information website.

Frequently victims fall into wells head-first, complicating recovery efforts. Often they are injured in the process, suffering joint dislocation or concussion. When fatal, this type of incident is termed a non-avalanche related snow immersion death (NARSID).

In the United States, over one nine-year period thirty-nine skiers and snowboarders died from snow immersion suffocation; two-thirds of the suffocated people died in tree wells.
