= Ski pole =

Item held in each hand for skiing

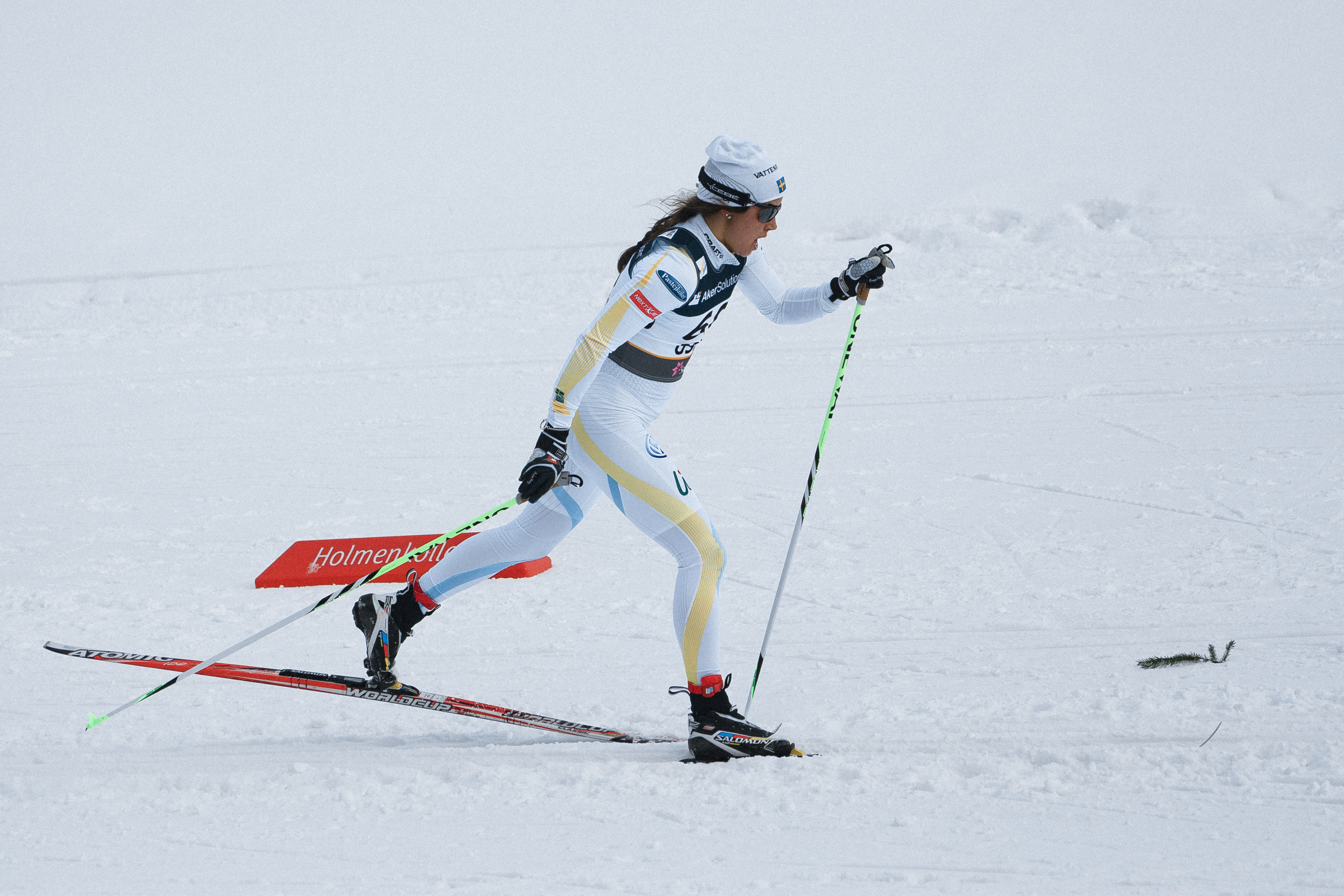
Anna Haag using poles for cross-country skiing

Ski poles, also referred to as poles (in North America), sticks (UK), or stocks (Australia), are used by skiers for balance and propulsion. Modern ski poles are most commonly made from aluminum and carbon fiber, though materials such as bamboo are still used. Poles are used in alpine skiing, freestyle skiing (with the exception of aerials), and cross-country skiing. Ski jumpers do not use poles.

== History ==
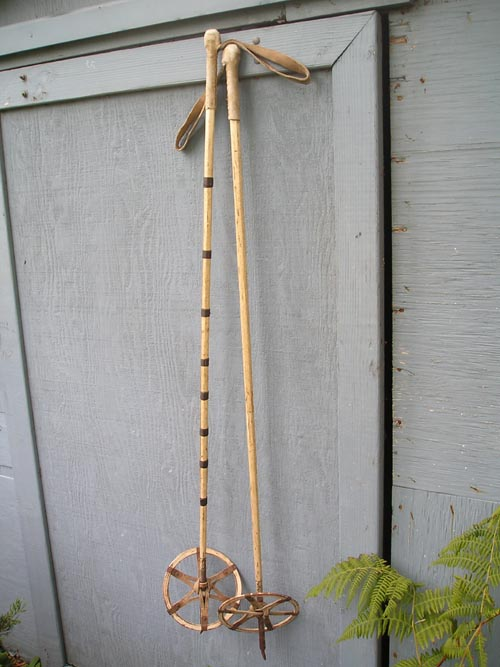
Wooden Cross Country ski poles, circa 1950.

As of 2012, the earliest ski pole was found in Sweden and dates back to 3623 BC, while the earliest depiction of a man with a ski pole was found in Norway in the form of a cave painting, dated at 4000 BC. Early skiers would use this pole for the purposes of balancing, braking, and turning. Alpine societies such as those in Nordic regions or the Altai mountains used their ski poles to hunt as well, giving them spear-like qualities. Skiers began to use two ski poles in 1741. This provided greater balance than one pole could provide and made pushing through the snow easier.

Early ski poles were made of pine and bamboo, materials which today are used for novelty poles. US patents for steel ski poles began in 1933 when John B. Dickson invented a new design calling for the use of steel as the shaft material. This construction was superseded by Edward L. Scott, who is credited with popularizing the lightweight aluminum ski pole in 1959, deriving his modern design from golf club shafts. This new stiff and lightweight pole made it easier for skiers to pole-plant and initiate fast, short turns.

The most modern material used in ski pole production is carbon fiber. A patent has been filed on a biocomposite material that can be used for ski poles, but this design has yet to be manufactured. Axel Composites has a patent for carbon fiber ski poles dating back to 1975, however, inventor David P. Goode's improved design from 1989 became the first widely produced. The carbon fiber pole builds on the same qualities of the aluminum pole: lightness and stiffness while being extremely strong.

== Features of ski poles ==
- Basket: Near the bottom end of the shaft, designed to stop the pole from sinking significantly into deep snow. These can range from being small, aerodynamic cones used in racing, to large snowflake shaped baskets which are used in powder skiing. Many poles feature methods of easily switching between baskets, such as threading on the basket and pole.

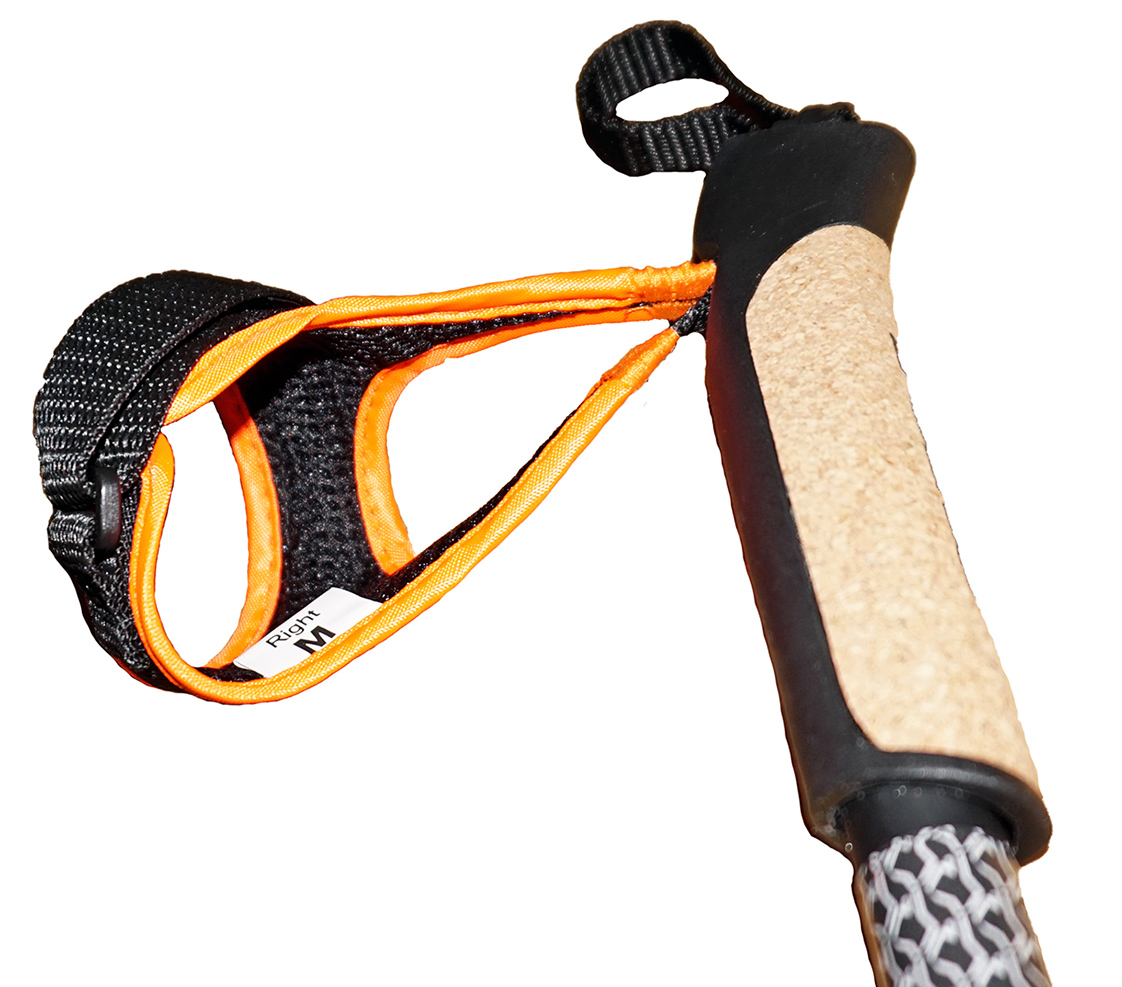
Ski pole grip with adjustable strap

- Grip: Attached to the upper part of the pole is a grip with a strap. These are slipped over the wrist to improve the skiers hold on the grip and to prevent the loss of the pole in the event of a fall. When backcountry skiing, the wrist strap may not be used to prevent wrist injury if the pole should catch on an unseen branch or root. Releasable strap systems have been implemented by pole manufacturers as well, which serve to prevent wrist injuries in the event of a crash.
- Length: Pole length varies according to use. Telescopic poles are available for adjustment while out skiing.
- Material: As noted previously, poles come in a two overarching materials, aluminum and carbon, alongside niche materials such as wood. Ski poles will sometimes use a mixture of materials, such as carbon-kevlar composites.

== Pole types ==
=== Alpine skiing ===
Poles are used in alpine skiing to add propulsion and to aid in controlling upper body position at turn initiation.

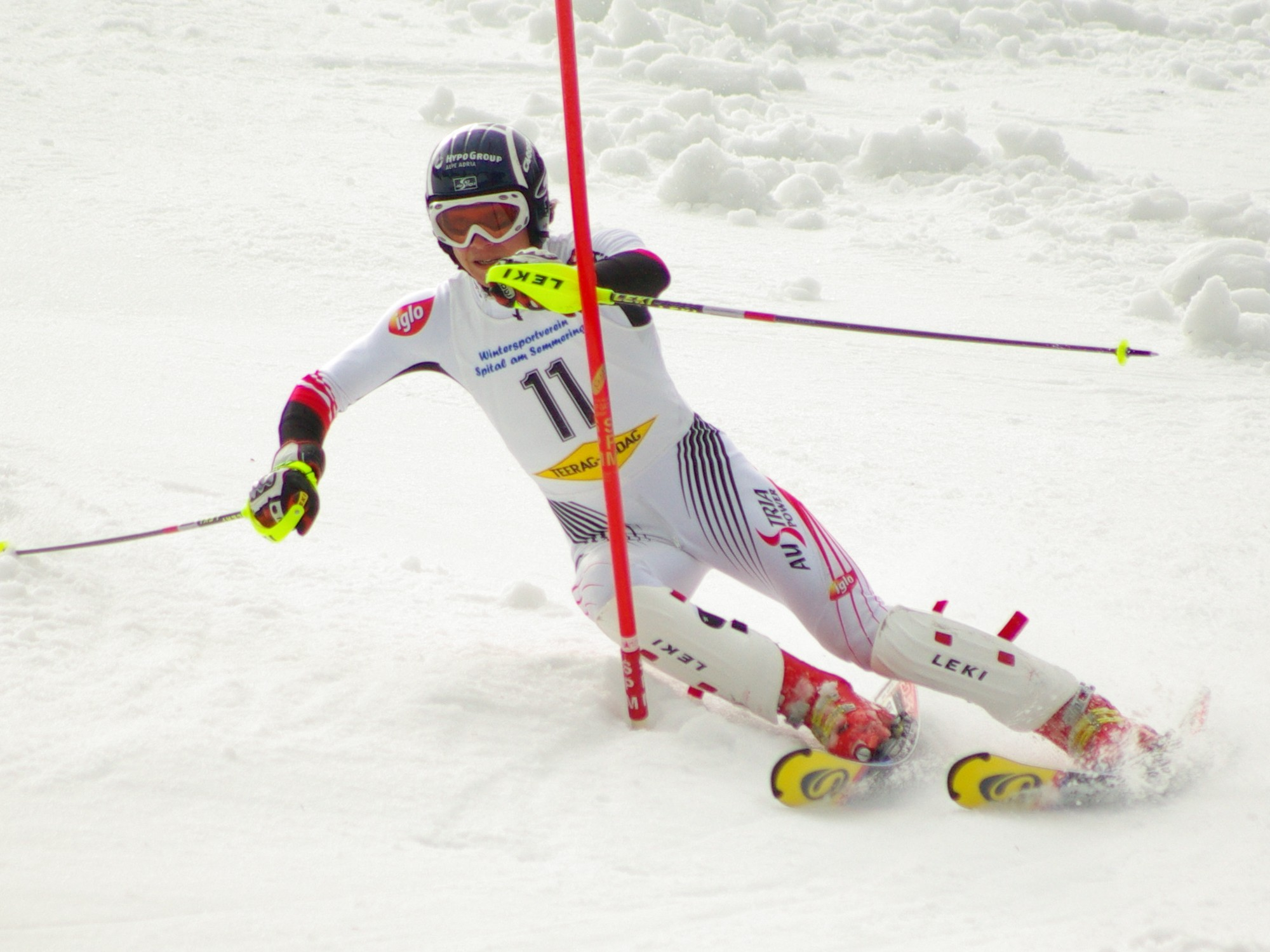
Note straight carbon-kevlar slalom poles with guards and small baskets

Racing poles have their own unique distinctions. Super giant slalom, downhill, and speed skiing poles are designed to bend around the skier's body while in a tuck position to minimize drag. In slalom skiing, straight poles are used due to the reduced speeds and increased reliance on poles. Slalom poles will often come with a guard attached to the grip for the purpose of deflecting gates.

Giant slalom skiers choose a straight or bent pole based on personal preference and situation; giant slalom courses can vary greatly in speed and in the case of slower courses, aerodynamic drag does not have as great a factor.

=== Cross-country skiing ===
Poles enable cross-country skiers to apply power to the snow, using arm motion; poles can also provide stability. In competitive cross-country skiing, poling technique is essential, especially so during a mass start in which double-poling is the main means of propulsion.

The length of poles used depends on technique (i.e. skate vs classic). Pole length for classic (aka diagonal-stride) technique is typically measured from the ground to the skier's armpit. For skating (aka freestyle) technique, the length of the pole is typically from the ground to the skier's upper lip. These length selections balance between maximum force production, efficiency, and technique considerations. Most Nordic ski pole manufacturers have sizing charts available.

=== Nordic walking ===
Nordic walking poles are largely similar to composite cross-country ski poles, just shorter in length and with a basket smaller than that of the racing cross country ski pole. The Nordic walking pole strap resembles a fingerless glove and is similar to the racing cross country ski pole strap.
