= Ski helmet =

Winter sports equipment

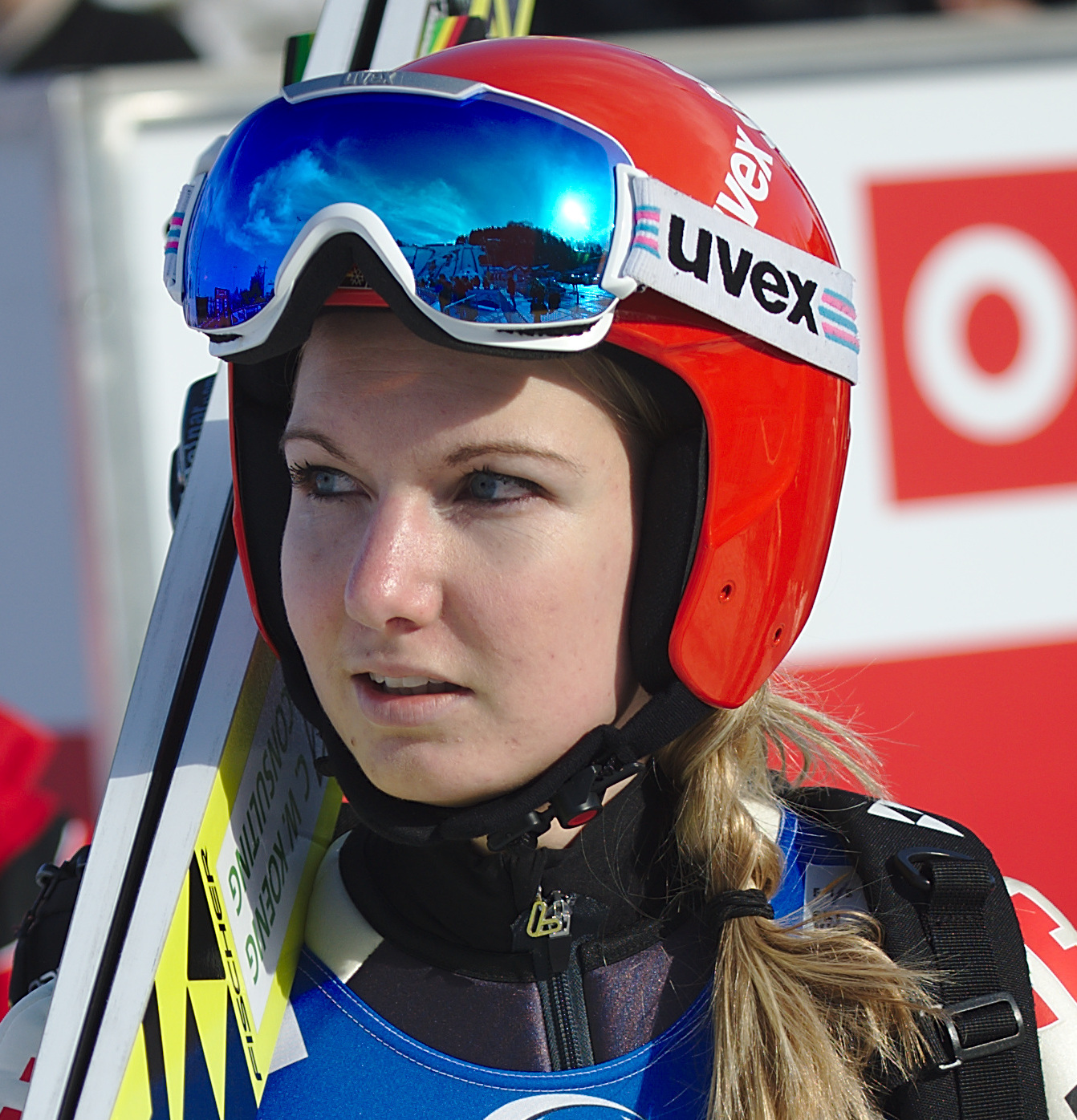
German ski jumper Svenja Würth helmet and goggles

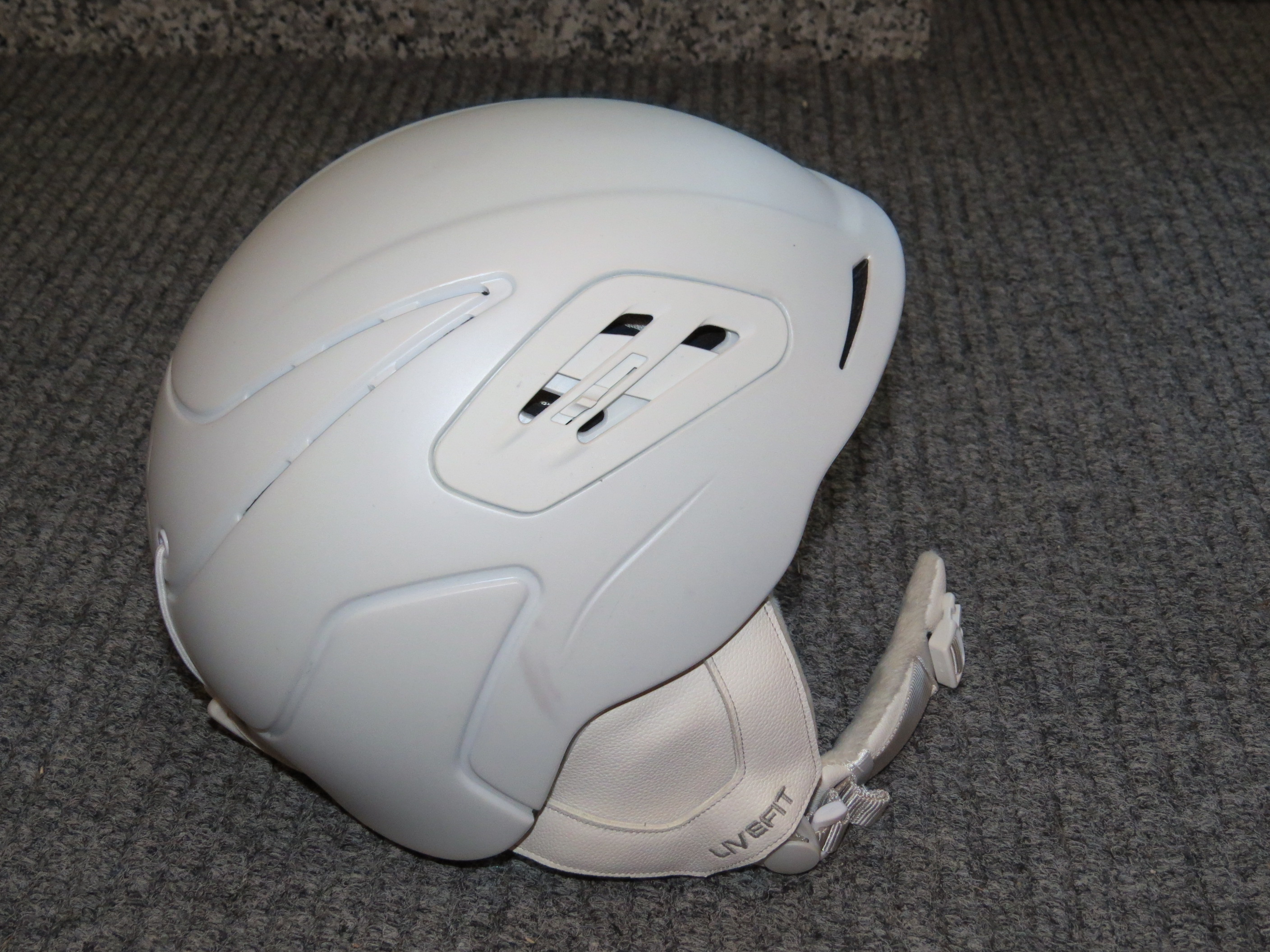
A typical ski helmet

A ski helmet is a helmet specifically designed and constructed for winter sports. Use was rare until about 2000, but by about 2010 the majority of skiers and snowboarders in the United States and Europe wore helmets. Helmets are available in many styles and typically consist of a hard plastic or resin shell with inner padding. Modern ski helmets may include many additional features, such as vents, earmuffs, headphones, goggle mounts, and camera mounts.

== Risks ==
In terms of injuries per 1,000 skier or snowboarder days, Switzerland reports around 3.5, Norway 1.5, Vermont, US, 1.9, and Canada 2.5. The death rate in the United States is about one per million visits, of which more than half are related to head injuries.

Studies from Switzerland, Germany, Austria, Norway and Canada show that the proportion of head injuries is estimated at 15% for ski injuries and 16% for snowboard injuries. 74% of head injuries occur when skiers hit their head on the snow, 10% when they collide with other skiers, and 13% when they collide with fixed objects.

== Usage ==
Germany, Austria, and Switzerland report 40%, 63%, 76% helmet wearing rates respectively. Switzerland reports a 95% helmet wearing rate among children. In France, 65% of children wear helmets. In the 2012-2013 ski season, 70 percent of all skiers and snowboarders wore helmets, up 5% from the previous season.

North Korea and Italy are the only countries where ski helmets are universally mandatory. North Korea initially set the standard (presumably at the time the Masikryong Ski Resort was opened), with Italy following the North Korean example in summer 2025, after intense campaigning by some local liberal parties.

No other country worldwide is known for mandating ski helmets universally, although some countries made them mandatory for children (such as some states of Austria, and the state of New Jersey) or for particular uses (such as employees at Vail Ski Resort in the US). Additionally, helmets may be mandatory at a local level, such as in the Canadian province of Nova Scotia, or at certain ski resorts.

== Standards and testing ==
Product certification norms include the European CE standard CEN 1077, issued in 1996, The American Society of Testing and Materials F2040, and the Snell RS-98. CEN 1077 permits an impact speed of about approx 20 km/h, which is far below average skiing speeds. Helmets are tested for effectiveness at about 14 mph (23 km/h), but the typical maximum speed of skiers and snowboarders is approximately twice that speed, with some participants going much faster. At such speeds, impact with a fixed object is likely to be fatal, regardless of helmet use.

== Effects ==
A meta-analysis, mostly of case-control studies, showed that skiers and snowboarders with a helmet were significantly less likely than those without a helmet to have a head injury. However, Swiss statistics on rescue services provided to people injured in snow sports show a fairly constant proportion of head injuries, while the observed rate of helmet wearing increased from 16% in 2002–2003 to 76% in 2009–2010.

Helmets have been shown to reduce the incidence of head injuries. Helmets have not been shown to reduce the number of fatalities. According to Jasper Shealy, "We are up to 40 percent usage but there has been no change in fatalities in a 10-year period."

It is not known whether helmet use results in risk compensation, i.e. skiers and snowboarders behaving less cautiously when they feel protected by a helmet, as studies give conflicting results. One study found that helmeted skiers tend to go faster and helmet-wearing has been associated with self-reports of more risky behavior. Other studies find that helmet use is not associated with self-reports of riskier behavior and does not increase the risk of other injuries.
