= Szczęśliwice Hill =

- Hill
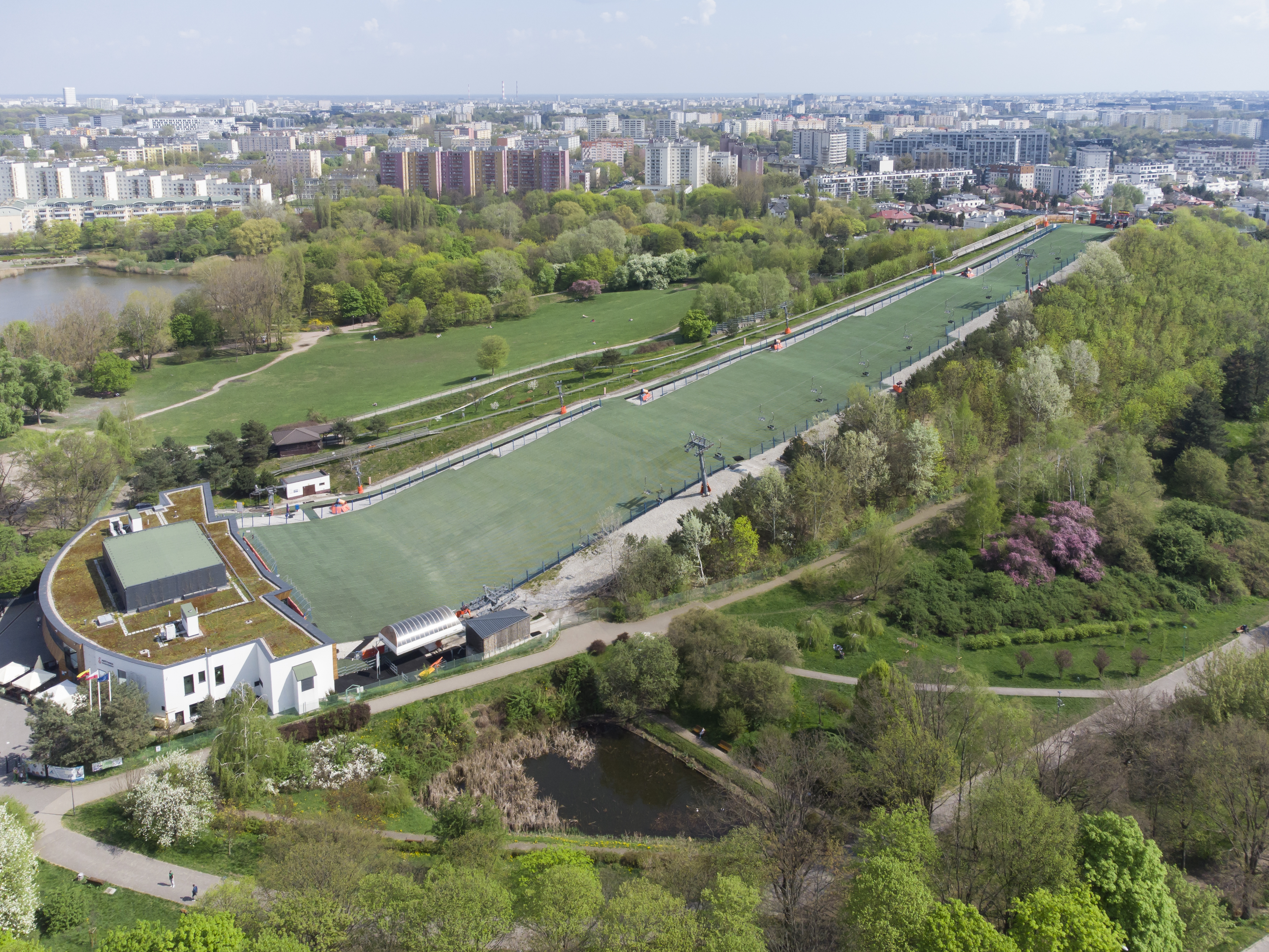
- View of the hill in 2023
- Interactive map of Szczęśliwice Hill
- Coordinates: 52°12′18″N 20°57′26″E
- Location: Warsaw, Poland
- Highest elevation: 152
- Surface elevation: 152 m (499 ft)
- Website: aktywnawarszawa.waw.pl/stok/

Szczęśliwice Hill (Polish: Górka Szczęliwicka) is an artificially created hill with a height of 152 metres (499 ft) above sea level. It is in Szczęśliwice Park, in the western part of Warsaw's Ochota district and it is the highest hill in the city.

The biggest attraction of the hill is skiing at the Szczęśliwice Centre.

== History ==
The hill was created as a dump for rubble from the destruction of Warsaw during the war, and later as a dump for trash. From 1967 to 1970 the dump was covered with earth and a park was created. By the 1980s, an illuminated slope with a ski lift already existed. The hill was 138 meters above sea level.

In June 1997, the resort was leased for 30 years to Energopol Trade SA, which made the hill 14 m taller (raising it to 152 m above sea level) and built a chairlift.

In the winter of 2005/2006 the center was closed as a result of conflict between the tenant and the City of Warsaw. In subsequent seasons 2006/07 and 2007/08 was opened for several winter months until September 2008, when an agreement was reached under which the city took over the equipment and buildings.

== Equipment ==
The ski slope has an area of 9,500 square meters covered with a Dendix mat made in England, which at zero and positive temperatures is sprayed with a "water spray" to reduce friction and improve slipperiness, while at sub-zero temperatures and with the absence of, or low amounts of snow, can be covered by a snow cannon (initially installed in 1999).

The camber (difference in height) of the slope is 44 m, which at its approximately 227 m gives the average slope of 19% (11°), which in turn qualifies the route as blue (easy). The maximum slope is 17°.

At the bottom of the slope there are isolated practice runs with a length of approximately 60 m.

The site has a chairlift with a capacity for 1200 people per hour (in winter) and 782 (in summer), and a ski lift with a capacity for 700 people per hour (winter and summer).

There is an observation deck at the foot of the slope which is about 900 m^{2}.

The hill is one of the 3 year-round ski sites in Poland, along with one in Poznań and the other in Bytom.
