= Reece Conca =

Australian rules footballer (born 1992)

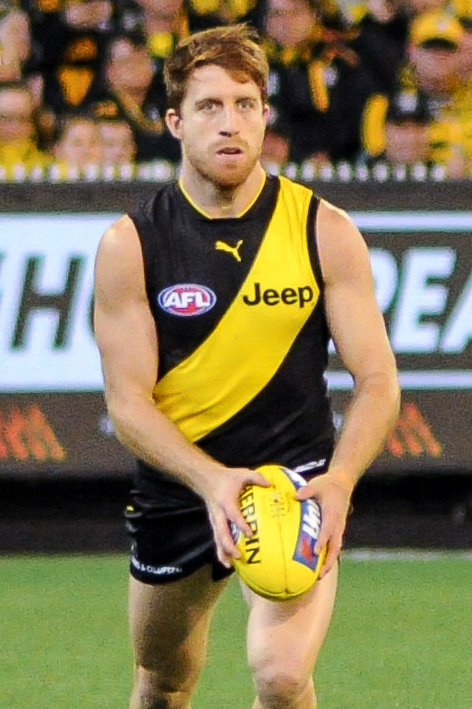
- Conca with Richmond in March 2017

Personal information
- Born: 12 August 1992 (age 34)
- Original team: Perth (WAFL)
- Draft: No. 6, 2010 AFL National Draft
- Debut: Round 1, 2011, Richmond vs. Carlton, at MCG
- Height: 181 cm (5 ft 11 in)
- Weight: 83 kg (183 lb)
- Position: Midfielder / defender

Playing career^{1}
Years	Club	Games (Goals)
2011–2018	Richmond	104 (23)
2019–2021	Fremantle	46 (2)
Total		150 (25)
- ^{1} Playing statistics correct to the end of the 2021 season.

Career highlights
- AFL Rising Star nominee: 2011; Cosgrove–Jenkins Award (RFC Best First-Year Player): 2011

Reece Conca (born 12 August 1992) is a former professional Australian rules footballer who played for the Fremantle Football Club and the Richmond Football Club in the Australian Football League (AFL). Drafted by the Tigers with the sixth overall pick in the 2010 AFL National Draft, Conca played 104 games across eight seasons with the club before moving to Fremantle as a free agent ahead of the 2019 season.

== Early life and junior football ==
Conca was born to parents Loui and Gina, with an older brother named Luke and a twin sister named Cassie. He spent his formative years in Victoria Park, Western Australia, a suburb three kilometres south-east of Perth.

As a junior, Conca was a talented soccer player but did not start playing competitive Australian rules football with the local Victoria Park side until the age of 13. He was quick to learn however, playing above his age group within his first year of picking up the sport. By the time he turned 16 he had already twice represented his state at national level and made his debut for the local representative Perth Football Club's WAFL colts side.

He attended high school at Perth's Trinity College and graduated in 2009 after captaining the school's senior football side.

Conca then began studying a university degree in commerce and psychology while in his final year of junior football eligibility in 2010. That year he made a role change, from half-back to inside midfielder. He ceased playing for his school and local club that year, instead focusing on playing state team matches and with the Perth WAFL colts side. He was impressive throughout that year including recording multiple 30 possession games in the colts side. As a result, he earned a senior WAFL debut with Perth at age 17 where he showed off his good ball use, strong evasive skills and his ability to win high possessions numbers.

At the 2010 AFL Under 18 Championships he again represented Western Australia and was this time the team's vice captain. Through the tournament Conca average 18 disposals per game at an efficiency of 79 per cent.

During this final year of junior football he suffered a broken left fibula but managed to play a mostly full season despite it.

=== AFL recruitment ===
In November 2010 Conca was predicted by the Herald Sun's Jay Clark to be selected by Sydney with the 21st overall selection in the forthcoming draft. He was at the same time compared to former Adelaide player Tyson Edwards and praised for his speed, creativity and midfield versatility. Conca was also noted for his abilities as a roaming defender along with his ability to handball cleanly in congestion. In the days leading into the draft Conca and his management expected he would be selected by Port Adelaide with the 16th pick. Meanwhile, the Herald Sun adjusted their predication and had him to be selected sixth overall by Richmond, a prediction matched by Emma Quayle of The Age. On the afternoon of the draft Richmond's club website published an article seemingly confirming they planned to draft Conca with their first selection.

== AFL career ==
=== Richmond (2011–2018) ===
==== 2011 season ====
Conca was drafted by Richmond with the club's first pick and the sixth selection overall in the 2010 AFL national draft.

He had a limited start to professional training, hampered by the continuing complications as a result of the broken fibula he suffered the year previous. One of six first round draft selections on the Richmond list in 2011, Conca came to the club with significant expectations despite the injury affected pre-season. He lived up to them early, making his AFL debut with a 15 disposal performance in round 1 of the 2011 season in a match against Carlton at the MCG. To mid-May Conca had played in each of Richmond's seven matches and did so to a level that club officials described as comparable to the debut season of teammate and future Brownlow Medalist Dustin Martin. In round 9 he received a nomination for the 2011 AFL Rising Star award for a "stellar performance" against Essendon in which he recorded 23 disposals and an equal game-high eight marks." To that point he carried averages of 18.9 disposals, five marks and 2.2 tackles per game. Conca remained in the side for a further four matches but saw his output reduced before being left out of the side to face Carlton in round 15. He returned after just one week however, playing in rounds 16 through 18 before missing another single match in round 19. Conca returned in round 20 to play just one more match at senior level that year. He finished 2011 having played 17 matches and held averages of 15.6 disposals, four marks and 1.8 tackles per game. Conca was awarded the Cosgrove–Jenkins Award at season's end as the club's best first year player.

==== 2012 season ====
A second limited pre-season awaited Conca in 2012, sidelined by groin soreness and hip arthroscopic surgery. He was fully fit for pre-season matches however, and in the NAB Cup opener, Conca was involved in a collision where he appeared to purposely block the path of unsuspecting North Melbourne's defender Leigh Adams. The AFL's Match Review Panel considered the high hit unintentional despite it occurring behind the play and graded it as reckless contact with high contact and high impact. The classification drew 425 demerit points and four-match suspension though a guilty plea entered by Conca reduced this suspension to three-matches. Due to rules in force that season but removed the year after, Conca was permitted to serve that three match suspension of the remainder of the pre-season competition, leaving him free to play in round 1 of the home and away season. That he did, returning to the club's best 22 in round 1 before turning in an impressive round 2 performance with 21 disposals and his first goal of his career in his 19th match. He doubled that mark in round 3, kicking two goals and recording a career-best 29 disposals in a round 3 win over Melbourne. Conca kicked goals again in rounds 6 and 7 before entering the bye in round 13 having played in all 12 of Richmond's AFL matches and holding averages of 18.5 disposals, 4.3 marks and 2.9 tackles per game. He missed his first match of the season in round 14 immediately following the bye before returning with 23 disposals against Melbourne in round 15. Two weeks later he was one of 11 Richmond players fined for participating in a melee during a tight loss to North Melbourne. Conca was impressive in round 19 when he matched his career-best 29 disposals and added seven marks, a performance that earned him his first Brownlow Medal vote of his career. He remained in the team for just one game though, fracturing the third metatarsal in his right foot while playing against the Western Bulldogs in round 20. It would prove his last match at AFL level that season, finishing the year having played 18 matches and averaging 19.4 disposals, 4.1 marks and 3.2 tackles per game. He also placed 15th in the club's best and fairest count.

==== 2013 season ====
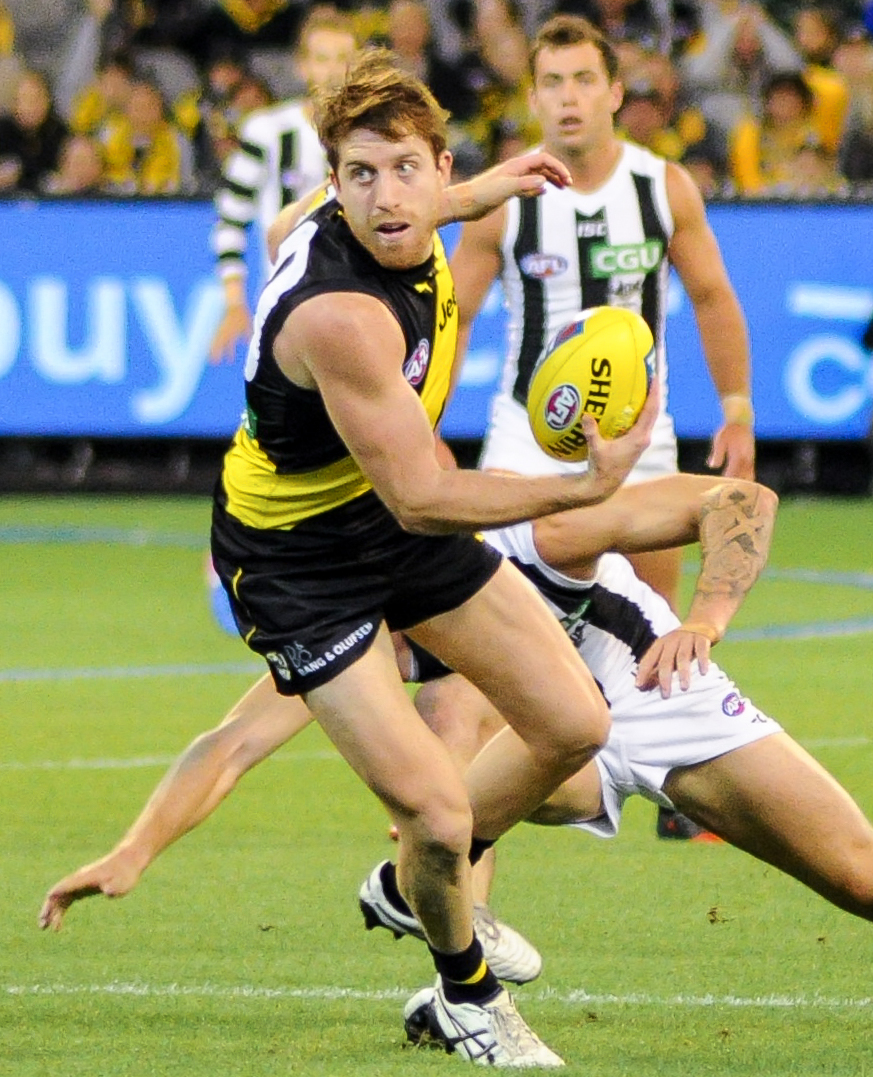
Conca evades a tackle in round 2 of the 2017 season

The lead up to the 2013 season was hampered by the continuing effects of the foot injury suffered the year previous, with the fracture failing to heal properly and Conca developing Achilles soreness as a result that saw him spend 10 weeks in a stabilising moon boot. He returned to fitness before the season began, and the year saw Conca make his biggest scoreboard impact of his career, a feat that started with a goal in round 1's win over Carlton. He repeated the effort in round 2, this time along with 25 disposals. After four consecutive matches at AFL level Conca suffered a stress reaction in his right foot, the recovery from which would see him miss an expected four weeks of football. While he was considered a chance to return in late May, Conca was not declared fully fit until mid-June He made his eventual return in round 12, after seven weeks on the sidelines. Following that match it was noted by a club website contributor that Conca was particularly energetic in celebrating goals with his teammates, going so far as to embrace them with a full-body hug. The celebration, coined the Conca Cuddle, soon became a signature of Conca's. He remained in the side for the following nine-weeks before playing a starring role with 21 disposals and a career-high three-goals in a round 20 win over the Brisbane Lions. Conca repeated the effort two weeks later in his 50th career match, kicking three-goals to go with 28 disposals and seven marks in a 121-point demolition of Greater Western Sydney. In September Conca played in the first final of his career, and the club's first in 12 years. It was not a joyous occasion however, with Conca tearing his hamstring and being substituted from the ground within the first 12 minutes of the opening quarter while his team went on to be eliminated from the finals off the back of the 20-point loss. He underwent surgery in the days the followed and was expected to recover in time for a return to full training by mid-December. Notably Richmond's fitness staff said the injury's severity had been a surprise given Conca had never previously had hamstring troubles. At the same time he had a small bone removed from his right heel, the problematic os trigonum bone that very few people are born with. Conca finished the year having played 17 matches, kicked a career-best 12 goals and placed 17th in the club's best and fairest count. In the trade period that followed he was the target of offers from rival clubs including a lure to return home to Western Australia. Fox Footy commentator David King at this time labelled him a must-keep player for Richmond, comparing Conca's playing style to that of former Brownlow Medallist Jimmy Bartel and predicting Conca would soon be behind only captain Trent Cotchin as Richmond's best midfielder. Reports suggested Fremantle had offered a four-year deal, while West Coast attempted to trump Richmond's offer with a two-year deal worth around $400,000 per season. Conca ultimately re-signed with Richmond, accepting a three-year deal and announcing it was "never in doubt" that he would opt to remain with the club.

==== 2014 season ====
In the early part of 2014 Conca was restricted to running drills, the result of his hamstring tear suffered in the previous year's finals series. Conca returned to full training in early February but missed the first of the club's pre-season matches two weeks later. He returned in a pre-season match later that month, playing an "outstanding" first half with 16 disposals and five clearances before being rested for the remainder of the match. That strong showing saw him make an immediate return in time for the home and away season's round 1. Conca equaled a then-career-best with eight tackles in that match before breaking it with 10 more in round 3. He went one better in round 6, laying 11 tackles in a loss to Hawthorn at the MCG. After seven rounds Conca led the club in pressure acts record and in total tackles (50). He played a further three matches at AFL level before missing rounds 12 and 13. From round 14 he played six consecutive matches including in a round 19 match with Greater Western Sydney. There he caused significant controversy when he struck Giants midfielder Devon Smith with an unseen off-the-ball elbow to the back of the head after the pair had been engaged in a minor scuffle during the second quarter of that match. The AFL's independent Match Review Panel handed Conca a two-match ban for the act, a response that drew significant criticism including from AFL CEO Gillon McLachlan who said the case should have gone straight to the AFL Tribunal. Conca made an immediate return following the suspension, playing in the last two of nine consecutive wins to close out the season and win his side through to an elimination final match-up with Port Adelaide. Conca kicked the side's first goal in that match and contributed a team-high inside 50s but it was not enough to avoid a 57-point eliminating loss. He finished the year having recorded a career-best 96 tackles, the most of any player at the club that season.

==== 2015 season ====
Conca trained at full capacity in the early part of the pre-season, entering the 2015 calendar year fully fit. This luck would not last however, with a fresh injury requiring him to undergo minor knee surgery in January. He would make his recovery in time to play a pre-season match against Port Adelaide in early March before suffering a hamstring injury not a long after that. Conca resumed training by mid-April and returned to competitive matches through the VFL in early May where he recorded 19 disposals with the club's reserves side. He suffered a re-occurrence after just three matches back though and spent another six weeks on the sidelines before returning to VFL football in mid-July. Strong form at that level saw him selected to play his first AFL match of the season in round 18 against Hawthorn. He remained in the side for one more week before yet another hamstring injury saw him sidelined again. It proved not to be his last AFL match of the year however, instead he was re-called as a shock selection to face North Melbourne in an elimination final in what coach Damien Hardwick labelled "a calculated risk". He came on as the substitute player midway into the third quarter and kicked an immediate goal. Despite his efforts Richmond would go out in an elimination final loss for the third straight year. Conca finished the year having played just three AFL matches.

==== 2016 season ====
In the lead up to the 2016 season Conca completed the first full pre-season training program of his career. He made a role change from midfield to half-back as well, and played this role during the club's pre-season matches. In the final match of that series Conca suffered yet another serious hamstring injury, a significant tear high up near the tendon that would require surgery and at least two months of recovery. During his recovery he began a muscle-strengthening pilates program which he later credited as key factor in his return to fitness. He missed 11 AFL matches as a result of the injury, making his return to football in round 12's match-up with Gold Coast at the MCG. Conca played four consecutive matches before missing one in round 17 and returning for two more games in round 18 and 19. A minor hamstring injury sustained in that round 19 match sidelined him for the following week's match. Conca made his return to football through the VFL in mid-August but did not play another match at AFL level that season, having played in six total for the year. By early September news reports emerged suggesting Conca and the club had agreed to mutually part ways in the forthcoming trade period. Efforts were made to shop Conca to other clubs, including a deal for Sydney ruck Toby Nankervis that was rejected by the Swans. Significant upheaval of the football department under newly appointed football director Neil Balme in October though saw the club change its tact, with Conca signing a new two-year contract to stay at Richmond by the end of the trade period.

==== 2017 season ====
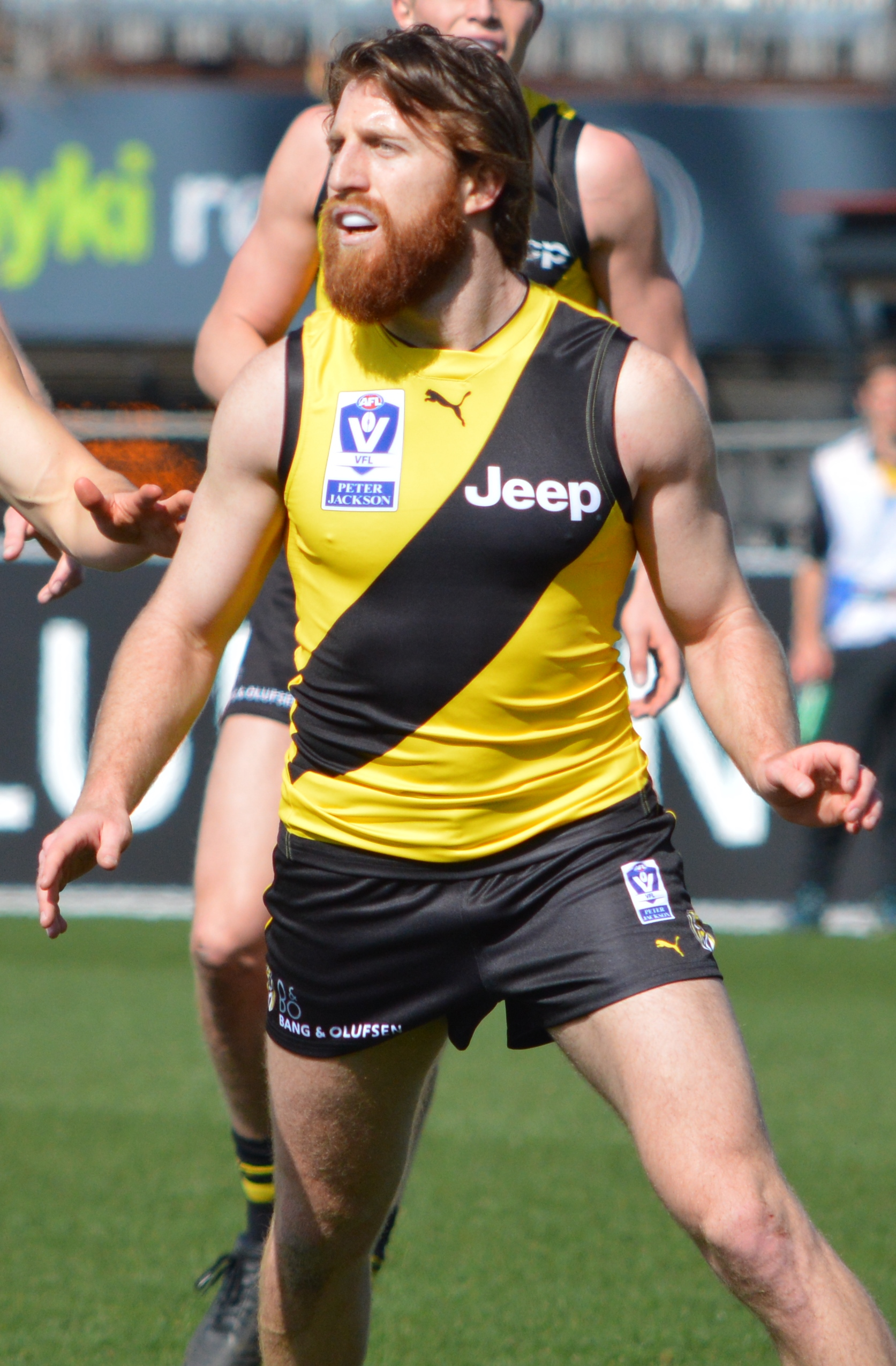
Conca with Richmond's VFL side in August 2017

Conca returned to contention for AFL selection by the start of the 2017 JLT Community Series, playing in all three pre-season matches including gathering 24 disposals and being named among Richmond's best in the final match of the series against Collingwood. During that series he was one of a number of "middle tier" players singled out by coach Damien Hardwick whose improvement would be keys to the team's performance in 2017. Conca earned AFL selection in round 1, tasked with a rebounding half-back role. He performed strongly in the first two weeks of the season before turning in an exceptional match against West Coast where he recorded four rebound 50s, four intercepts and six marks along with 25 disposals, his first such haul in nearly three years. In round 6 Conca suffered what appeared to be an ankle injury in the first quarter of the match against Adelaide, before returning to close out the remainder of the contest. A diagnosis in the days that followed classed the injury as relatively minor damage to the Lisfranc joint in his foot, but that it would still require an expected recovery time of three-to-six weeks. After two weeks in a moon boot to stabilise the joint, further scans revealed the injury to be much more severe than first thought. In all his recovery would take more than three months, with a return coming via the VFL in late August. Conca would not manage to break into the AFL team before their premiership run, but did feature in each of the VFL side's three finals victories as well as in their losing grand final against Port Melbourne. In the trade period that followed he was once again the subject of trade speculation, linked to a possible move to Fremantle with some media reports suggesting he was on the verge of requesting a trade despite having a year to run on his contract at Richmond. These reports were ultimately unfounded, with Conca remaining at Richmond at the trade period's end. He finished the year having played just six AFL matches and bringing his three-year total to just 15 of a possible 70 appearances at senior level.

==== 2018 season ====
Conca completed a full pre-season training regime in the lead-in to the 2018 season and underwent a positional change during that time, moving into a predominately midfield role after playing at half-back in previous years. He played for the first time that year with the club's contingent sent to the AFLX exhibition tournament in Sydney in mid-February. That was followed with selection in each of the club's two pre-season matches before officially re-joining the club's best-22 with selection for round 1's season opening match against Carlton. In the first two months of the season he played in all eight of the club's AFL matches, his first such consecutive streak since the 2013 season. While Conca spent the early part of that stretch covering for the suspended Nathan Broad in defence, he was later moved to a midfield role that saw him regularly attending centre bounces while playing as an inside defensive midfielder. At the mid-season bye Conca had played in all 13 senior matches so far that year and led the club in tackles (72) and ranked top-five for disposals, contested possessions and centre clearances. In round 15 and immediately following the bye, Conca lined up in his 100th AFL match. It was not to be a happy occasion however, with Conca suffering a horrific dislocation of his left ankle when twisted in a tackle by Sydney forwards Lance Franklin and Tom McCartin. On initial appearances it had seemed that that injury was a lower leg fracture that would require 12 months of rehabilitation. Remarkably, scans conducted the following day revealed he had suffered no structural damage to the bones or joints surrounding the ankle. The dislocation was corrected without surgery and Conca spent less than two weeks in a stabilising moon boot before returning to aerobic conditioning training. By late-June he had resumed running without the help of an anti-gravity treadmill and by the first week of August he had begun participating in full training. Conca made his return to match-play with the club's reserves side in the VFL in mid-August. There he suffered a rolled ankle on the opposite foot to the existing injury, the result of which saw him leave the game early. The injury did not prove serious however, with Conca considered back to full fitness in time to be recalled to AFL football the following week. He recorded 21 disposals, including 18 by three-quarter time, in that round 22 win over Essendon. Conca held his spot the next week and helped the club seal its position as ladder leaders at the end of the home and away season. He played a contributing role with 17 disposals and six tackles in the club's qualifying final win over Hawthorn and followed it with 18 disposals and five tackles in the shock knock-out preliminary final loss to Collingwood. Conca finished the season having played 18 matches and placed third at the club for total tackles recorded that season.

Conca headed into the 2018 trade period as an unrestricted free agent after previously putting contract talks with Richmond on hold until the end of the season. Media reports had again suggested Fremantle were interested in acquiring him, as they had been in 2013, 2016 and 2017. Conca's manager confirmed that he had attracted an offer from Fremantle but that negotiations with Richmond were ongoing. Two days before the beginning of the 2018 free agency period, The Australian reported that Conca was set to forgo a two-year deal at Richmond to sign a longer term free agency contract with Fremantle.

=== Fremantle (2019–2021) ===
On the opening day of the 2018 free agency period, Conca accepted a three-year contract offer from Fremantle to move to the club as an unrestricted free agent. When Fremantle's leadership group was announced ahead of the 2019 season, Conca was a surprise addition to the group, having been voted into the group by his new teammates. Across the 11 games prior to Fremantle's mid-season bye, Conca averaged 20.5 disposals per game, his highest return from all his previous seasons.

== Statistics ==
Statistics are correct to the end of the 2019 season

Legend
G	Goals	K	Kicks	D	Disposals	T	Tackles
B	Behinds	H	Handballs	M	Marks

Season	Team	No.	Games	Totals							Averages (per game)						
Season	Team	No.	Games	G	B	K	H	D	M	T	G	B	K	H	D	M	T
2011	Richmond	30	17	0	5	139	126	265	68	30	0.0	0.3	8.2	7.4	15.6	4.0	1.8
2012	Richmond	30	18	5	5	202	147	349	73	57	0.3	0.3	11.2	8.2	19.4	4.1	3.2
2013	Richmond	30	17	12	11	203	109	312	61	59	0.7	0.6	11.9	6.4	18.4	3.6	3.5
2014	Richmond	30	19	3	3	200	156	356	67	96	0.2	0.2	10.5	8.2	18.7	3.5	5.1
2015	Richmond	30	3	1	1	22	20	42	7	8	0.3	0.3	7.3	6.7	14.0	2.3	2.7
2016	Richmond	30	6	0	2	52	49	101	19	25	0.0	0.3	8.7	8.2	16.8	3.2	4.2
2017	Richmond	30	6	0	4	68	40	108	20	18	0.0	0.7	11.3	6.7	18.0	3.3	3.0
2018	Richmond	30	18	2	4	184	150	334	43	92	0.1	0.2	10.2	8.3	18.6	2.4	5.1
2019	Fremantle	6	22	2	3	282	165	447	68	78	0.1	0.1	12.8	7.5	20.3	3.1	3.6
Career			126	25	38	1352	962	2314	426	463	0.2	0.3	10.7	7.6	18.4	3.4	3.7

== After AFL career ==
Conca is now a part of the Bannockburn football netball club in the GDFL

== Honours and achievements ==
Team

- McClelland Trophy (Richmond): 2018

Individual

- AFL Rising Star nominee: 2011
- Cosgrove–Jenkins Award (Richmond best first-year player): 2011

== Personal life ==
Conca's brother Luke also plays football and did so with Richmond's VFL side between 2014 and 2016. The pair played together as juniors when Reece played up an age-group.

Their family is of Italian heritage, with their history tracing back to Calabria, in the country's south. His mother works as a teacher and his father is in construction management. Conca's grandparents own and operate an Italian restaurant in Perth.

In addition to studies in commerce and psychology, Conca has completed a diploma in youth work and volunteers weekly with Challenge, an organisation for children with cancer.

Conca traveled to Rio de Janeiro in the summer before the 2014 season, one of nine Richmond players making a cultural-exchange trip as part of a project to work with disadvantaged kids that was developed by researchers at the Royal Melbourne Institute of Technology.
