= William Staub =

American mechanical engineer

William Edward Staub (November 3, 1915 – July 19, 2012) was an American mechanical engineer who invented and developed the first consumer treadmill for home use, the PaceMaster 600, during the late 1960s. Dr. Kenneth H. Cooper, who helped to popularize Staub's invention, has described Staub as "a pioneer in exercise — not for the athlete, but for the masses."

== Life ==
Staub was born in Philadelphia, Pennsylvania, on November 3, 1915. He lived in Clifton, New Jersey, for most of his life, residing in the town for more than seventy years. He originally moved to New Jersey to work as an engineer for the propeller division of Curtiss-Wright, an aircraft manufacturer, during World War II. He later founded the Besco Corp., an aerospace components producer headquartered in Clifton, New Jersey. The name "Besco" stood for the "Bill Edward Staub Corporation."

Staub developed the first consumer treadmill after reading the 1968 book, Aerobics, by Dr. Kenneth H. Cooper. Cooper's book noted that individuals who ran a mile for eight minutes four-to-five times a week would be in better physical condition than those who did not. Staub noticed that there were no inexpensive treadmills for home use at the time and decided to develop a treadmill for his own use. His son Gerald, designed an on-off switch for the machine. Once finished, he sent his prototype, which he called the PaceMaster 600, to Cooper. Cooper enjoyed the invention and found the treadmill's first customers, who included fitness equipment salespeople. In a 2012 interview, Cooper said of Staub's early prototype: "There really wasn’t a practical treadmill in those days ... no one had come along with a way for people to exercise indoors, in a way that simulated outdoor exercise."

Staub began production of the first home treadmills at his plant in Clifton, New Jersey, before moving production to Little Falls, New Jersey. The success of the treadmill lead Staub to slowly halt his work in the aerospace industry. Instead he focused on the treadmill through his work at Aerobics Inc., a treadmill manufacture founded by Cooper. Staub sold the business to his sons, Gerald Staub and Thomas Staub, in the mid-1990s and retired from the industry. He used the treadmill until two months before his death in 2012.

Outside of engineering, Staub owned the Colonial Lanes bowling alley in Lawrenceville, New Jersey, and was a bowling enthusiast.

In 2006, Runner's World magazine paid tribute to Staub in a feature article titled, "Our Favorite Things: 40 Years of Running Gear Innovation." The magazine stated that the PaceMaster 600 eliminated bad weather as a valid excuse to skip running.

William Staub died on July 19, 2012, at the age of 96, at his home in Clifton, New Jersey. His wife, Dorothy, died in 2007, and their daughter, Patricia, died in 1977. Staub was survived by two daughters, Dorothy Kentis and Dolores Colucci-Healey; four sons, William, Norman, Gerald and Thomas; twenty-one grandchildren and fourteen great-grandchildren.
