= AlterG =

American medical technology company

AlterG, Inc.
- Industry: Medical devices
- Founded: 2005; 21 years ago
- Founder: Sean Whalen
- Headquarters: Fremont, California, USA
- Key people: Charles Remsberg (CEO); Kevin Davidge (COO); Fran Hackett (VP of Sales & Marketing); Mike Philips (VP Quality & Sustaining Engineering); Rick Prince (VP Design Engineering); Matt Rudden (VP Operations)
- Products: Treadmills, bionic legs
- Owner: Independent (2005–23); ReWalk Robotics (2023–present)
- Number of employees: 60 (2019)
- Website: www.alterg.com

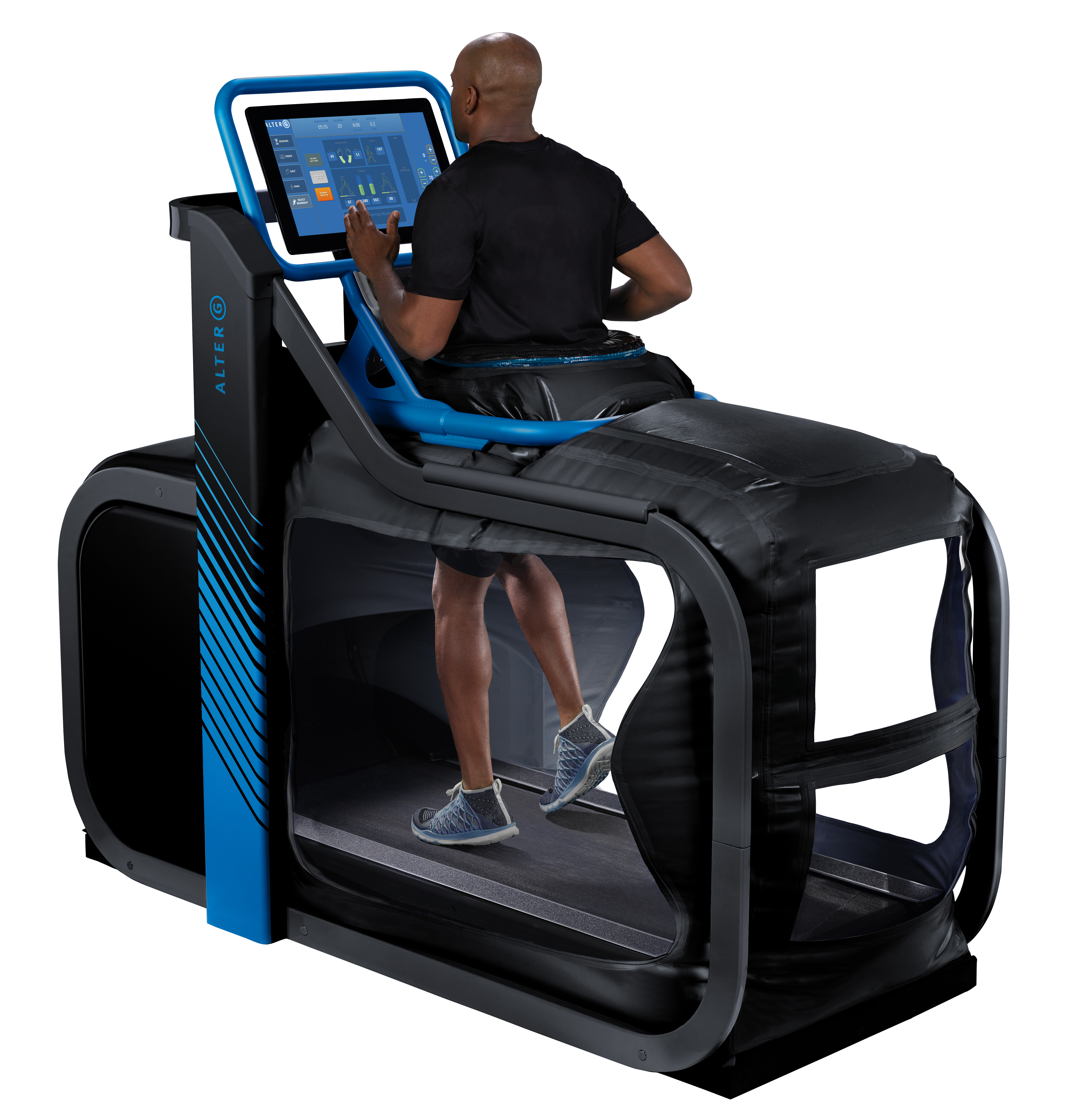
Via 400X Anti-Gravity Treadmill

AlterG, Inc. is a medical device company that makes mobility enhancement products for physical therapy and athletic training. Its first product, the Anti-Gravity Treadmill, now has a product line that includes the M/F320, Via 400 and 400X, and Pro 200 and 500.

On August 11, 2023, ReWalk Robotics completed the purchase of AlterG for $19 million. Founded in 2005 by Sean Whalen in Fremont, California, the company has Charles Remsberg as its CEO.

== History ==
Sean Whalen and his father developed the original prototype of the Anti-Gravity Treadmill in the family garage, using technology developed by NASA to create a treadmill that unweights a user through "differential air pressure". The Nike Oregon Project, runner and coach Alberto Salazar, the Oakland Raiders and the Golden State Warriors tested and used the prototype.

In 2007, the Washington Wizards were the first professional sports team to purchase the P200 model. The following year, the Miami Heat, Golden State Warriors, Chicago Bulls, Houston Rockets, Houston Texans, and Phoenix Suns all purchased the P200 for their training rooms.

In 2008, the U.S. Food and Drug Administration (FDA) cleared the Anti-Gravity Treadmill, which at the time went by the name G-Trainer, as a medical device applicable for uses in rehabilitation. Since then, the AlterG treadmill has been used for rehabilitating lower extremity injury or surgery, aerobic conditioning, weight control, gait training for neurological conditions, strengthening and conditioning the elderly.

Named CEO of AlterG, Inc. in 2011, Steve Basta is a graduate of the Johns Hopkins Biomedical Engineering program. Ten years after acquiring the Tiburon Corporation and adding the Bionic Leg to its product line, AlterG was purchased in 2023 by Israeli company ReWalk Robotics Ltd.

== Technology ==
All of AlterG's products are manufactured and assembled at the company's headquarters in Fremont, CA. The company's line of Anti-Gravity Treadmills and its Bionic Leg both use patented technologies.

=== Differential air pressure ===
NASA developed the differential air pressure technique as a way for astronauts to exercise and maintain conditioning in space.

In 2012, NASA purchased the P200 model to use for pre-flight and post-flight training of International Space Station astronauts. AlterG now holds a patent for this technology, which employs air pressure to adjust the users body weight on the treadmill between 20% and 100% of normal weight.

A year later, AlterG was named by Fast Company as one of the top 10 most innovative companies in sports for its Anti-Gravity Treadmill. The company's Anti-Gravity Treadmill M320 was cleared by the FDA for use in medical facilities, hospitals, physical therapy clinics, and skilled nursing facilities - like the other models, the M320 can reduce a user's body weight by up to 80%.

Launched in 2013, the Anti-Gravity Treadmill F320 is classified as a fitness product and does not meet some of the electrical interference requirements designated by some hospitals. Meanwhile, Pro Anti-Gravity Treamills are used in professional athlete training and conditioning because of their high top speed of 18 mph.

=== Intention based therapy ===
Bob Horst developed the technology behind the Bionic Leg, which contains sensors and robotics that detect and provide force when a patient's weight shifts. The Bionic Leg is a battery-operated external brace that uses information from foot sensors to predict the user's movements while the user walks, sits, and stands.

== In professional sports ==
The company's Anti-Gravity Treadmill is used by professional sports teams and university sports programs, including the Seattle Seahawks, Miami Heat, Boston Red Sox, Detroit Tigers, Washington Wizards, Golden State Warriors, Oakland Raiders, New York Jets, Atlanta United FC, Texas Rangers, Green Bay Packers, Arizona Diamondbacks, Detroit Lions, Milwaukee Brewers, Los Angeles Dodgers, Buffalo Bills, Pittsburgh Steelers, Toronto Blue Jays, Philadelphia 76ers and Hawthorn Hawks. US Olympic Training Centers also use the Anti-Gravity Treadmill.

NBA players Kobe Bryant and LeBron James and former marathon record holder Paula Radcliffe use the Anti-Gravity Treadmill for physical therapy and training. Tom Brady, quarterback for the Tampa Bay Buccaneers, purchased two of the Anti-Gravity Treadmills.

== In medicine ==
The company's products are used in medical centers and physical therapy clinics for various types of rehabilitation. In the United States, the products are used by Johns Hopkins Medicine, the Mayo Clinic, University of San Francisco, UNC Health Care, and Stanford Medical Center.
