= Wheelchair trainer =

Exercise device for wheelchair users

A wheelchair trainer or wheelchair treadmill is an apparatus that allows a manual wheelchair user to simulate linear (translational) travel while remaining stationary in a manner similar to an ambulatory person walking or running on a treadmill or a cyclist pedaling a bicycle on a bicycle trainer. The rear wheelchair wheels are placed in contact with vertical or horizontal rollers which may also be attached to flywheels, mechanical resistance or braking mechanisms, motors and various speed and force sensors. Flywheels may be sized to provide a user of a certain mass with a rotational inertia equivalent to their translational (linear) inertia in order to more realistically approximate actual wheelchair propulsion.

Wheelchair trainers having independent contact rollers permit simulated directional travel (omnidirectional treadmill). Trainers may also incorporate rotary encoders, accelerometers and torque sensors to enable interface with computer data acquisition systems (DAQ) for analysis of propulsion kinematics. A quadrature rotary encoder or Hall-effect sensor can be implemented to provide sufficient speed and direction information to enable virtual navigation interface with video games in a manner similar to using a joystick or gaming console. Calculation of rolling resistance between the tire and contact roller interface, axle friction, and inertial characteristics of wheelchair wheels and flywheels may be used in determination of stationary propulsion dynamics.^{[dynamics]}

== History ==
The United States Department of Veterans Affairs (VA) has substantially invested in decades long research and development for two wheelchair trainer devices: the Wheelchair Aerobic Fitness Trainer (WAFT), and GameWheels. The history of wheelchair trainer development may be summarized from the 10 patents issued by the United States Patent and Trademark Office for stationary wheelchair trainers/treadmills/ergometers/dynamometer/simulators issued from 1980 to 2009.

US patent number	Issue date	Key features
4,233,844	November 18, 1980	introduces variable inertial flywheels to approximate user mass with speed and torque sensors
4,911,425	March 27, 1990	WAFT (early model) implements independent adjustable wheel resistance
4,966,362	October 30, 1990	incorporates forward or reverse unidirectional wheel rotation
5,476,429	December 19, 1995	WAFT (later model) introduces cardio exercise with active electrical controls, DAQ and video gaming interface
5,643,143	July 1, 1997	implements positioning over two rollers
5,649,883	July 22, 1997	minimizes rolling resistance for 3 wheeled wheelchair race chairs
5,704,876	January 6, 1998	implements bicycle trainer eddy current braking resistance and active computer control interface
5,709,631	January 20, 1998	implements lateral wheel guides to prevent side sway
6,113,519	September 5, 2000	utilizes electrically controlled resistance and camber adjustment for clinical applications
7,604,572	October 20, 2009	implements horizontal rollers with passive variable inertia and resistance, clinical DAQ and video gaming interface

== Development ==
The last patent is being commercialized under the trademark Trekease, designed to serve as an acronym for Translational & Rotational Equivalent Kinetic Energy Aerobic Stationary Exertainment and as a homonym for Trekkies – fans of Star Trek. None of the other cited patents, including the experimental prototypes developed by the VA, are currently being commercialized; however simple unidirectional ramp and roller systems similar in design to patent #4,966,362 are being marketed by others. (See also External links).

Arcade game software and clinical data acquisition use were first introduced by the Veterans Administration's WAFT as a means of promoting stationary wheelchair propulsion as a beneficial aerobic exercise. Clinical professionals are not currently in agreement regarding the cardiovascular health benefits associated with manual wheelchair propulsion and the possible long term repetitive use injuries attributed to manual wheelchair operation.^{[aerobics]} These debates have encouraged developments to enhance wheelchair seating, back support, frame, wheel, and hand-rim designs. Innovative lever styled mechanisms add a new level to improve the overall efficiency, posture and ergonomics of manual wheelchair propulsion.^{[ergonomics]} Utilizing lever propulsion technologies on a wheelchair trainer equipped with flywheel and resistance enables one to engage in an activity similar to rowing with all its associated health benefits and risks.
