= Ski school =

Establishment that teaches skiing

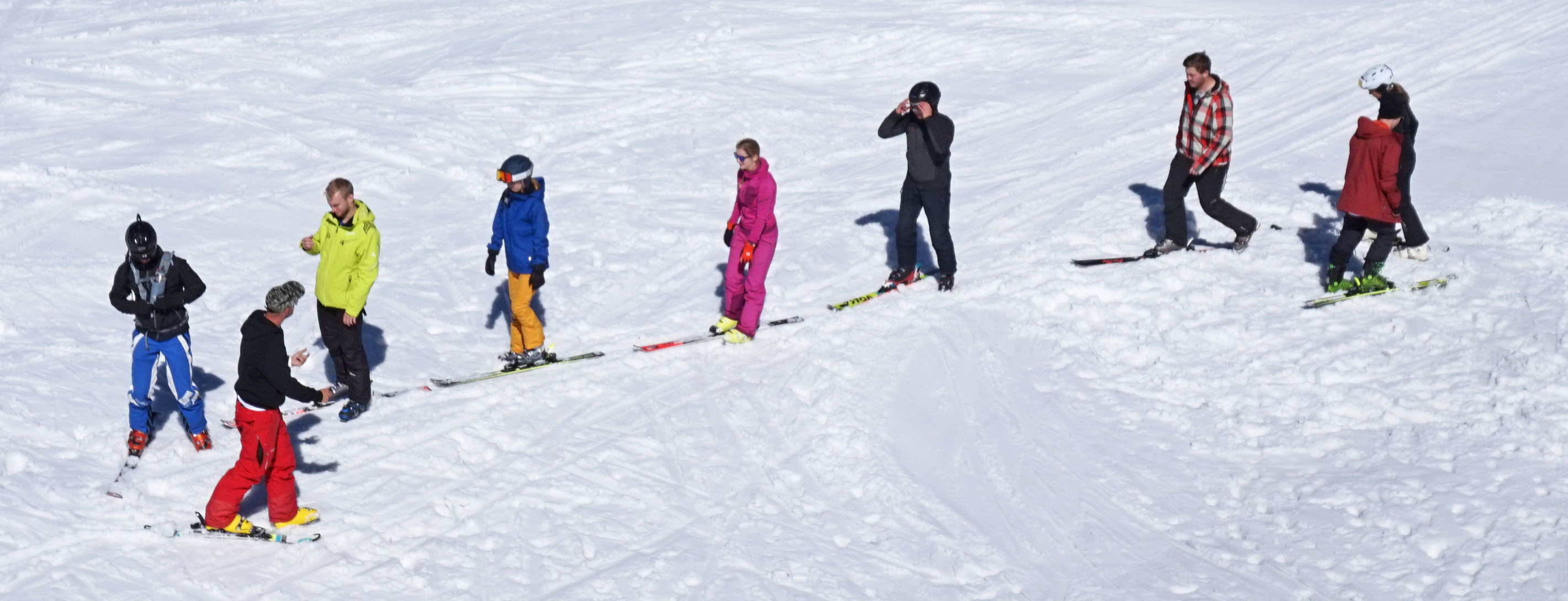
Ski lesson

A ski school is an establishment that teaches skiing, typically in a ski resort. The modern version of the ski school was invented by the Austrian ski pioneer Hannes Schneider in the early 1920s when he formalized instruction methods and established these methods as teaching principles for all ski instructors at his school.

== Overview ==
In alpine skiing in North America, many resorts have their own ski school. In Europe, a resort may have many different private ski schools. Instructors are usually trained and certified by their national organizations, such as the Canadian Ski Instructors' Alliance in Canada and the Professional Ski Instructors of America in the US, both of which may certify their instructors with an international level overseen by the International Ski Instructors' Alliance. In some cases, especially in Canada, some provincial organizations, such as OT3 in Ontario and PESQ in Quebec, may certify ski instructors.

Lessons can be in a group or private. While instruction usually takes place on the slopes, some skiers are also trained with the help of ski simulators.

More recently, virtual platforms such as Vimbu have emerged to provide a way for skiers to book lessons with certified ski instructors directly, without needing to go through a ski school.
