= Naturmobil =

Horse-powered vehicle

The Naturmobil is a horse-powered vehicle for travel on paved roads. The vehicle is controlled by a driver in a similar way to a motor-driven vehicle, with the horse inside the vehicle on a treadmill. It weighs 300 kg (660 lb), or probably around 700 kg (1,500 lb) with the horse. It cruises at about 20 km/h (12 mph), with a top speed of about 80 km/h (50 mph). The treadmill also charges batteries which will power the vehicle if the horse needs a break.

The vehicle was invented by Abdolhadi Mirhejazi, an Iranian engineer, in 2008. At least one veterinarian, Dr. Matt Pietrak, has concerns for the horse's wellbeing while powering the vehicle.
