= Ski simulator =

Devices for practicing skiing

A ski simulator is an installation or device which allows the user to mimic the actions of snow skiing without a snow-covered expanse of terrain. They are used for endurance and technique training, and range from home exercise equipment to immersive virtual reality systems in Olympic training centers.

== Intended use ==
Simulators are primarily used for endurance and technique training, which can take place off-season, indoors or outside the snow belt. The level of fidelity ranges from home exercise equipment (simulating the classic Nordic cross-country stride or the slalom side to side motion) to immersive virtual reality systems in Olympic training centers. Indoor installations permit training to be done in any season.

Balance, control and strength are learned by practice and actively doing training drills and lessons on the ski simulators.

Other analogues feature artificial surfaces or roller equipment.

== Endless slope ==
An endless slope is a sloped treadmill that allows skiers and snowboarders to refine form and strengthen muscles. Practicing on this treadmill that simulates snow allows carving, edging, pressuring, steering, and balance on skis or a snowboard, allowing the rider to experience the same muscle workout as on the mountain while developing the skills needed to gracefully move on snow. Revolving carpet ski simulators and indoor ski slope carpets have been widely installed since the early 1960s. They can be used for introductory training or to improve skills for expert skiers, especially outside the ski season.

An alpine skiing simulator is a conveyor having an inclined surface with a moving multi-layer carpet, made out of a composite material. The band’s movement is directed upwards of the inclined surface towards the skier. Using a remote control, an instructor can set up different skiing conditions. For safety reasons the simulator has a smooth start and a smooth stop of the carpet and emergency stop sensors.

To ensure good slipping performance the upper working layer of the carpet is moistened with water, sending a signal from a remote control. In addition to that, if the slipping performance needs to be increased, it is possible to treat the working layer of the carpet with a special concentrate.

== See also ==
- Indoor ski slope
- Roller skiing
- Ski school
- Alpine Racer
- Moving walkway
- Flowriding
