= Dry ski slope =

Sport discipline

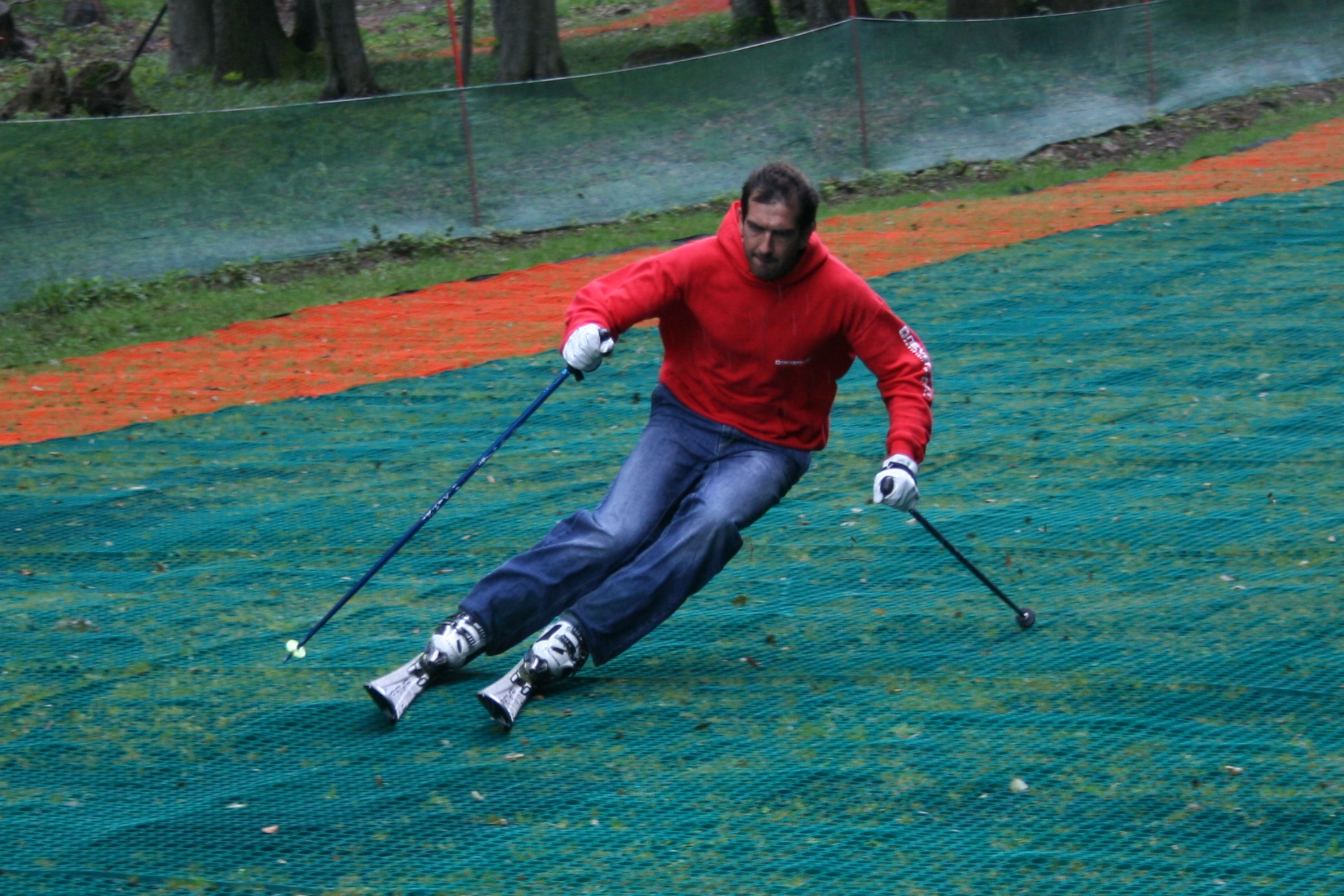
Dry ski slope in Sátoraljaújhely, Hungary (Neveplast)

Warmwell artificial ski slope in Dorset, U.K. (Snowflex)

A dry ski slope or artificial ski slope is a ski slope that mimics the attributes of snow using materials that are stable at room temperature, to enable people to ski, snowboard or snow tube in places where natural, snow-covered slopes are inconvenient or unavailable.

Although commonly known as "dry ski slopes", many slopes are lubricated using a mist or jet system to increase speed and prevent damage to equipment from friction heat build-up.

== Materials ==
=== Early materials ===
A variety of materials can be found on dry ski slopes.

Early efforts to mimic snow involved laying extruded plastic tiles with upward spikes in an attempt to provide grip. These were unpopular as they provided little grip and turning capability and the experience was similar to skiing across ice.

However, in present day, many ski slopes (both indoor and outdoor) continue to use plastic, injection moulded tiles. Quality has improved and many dry ski slopes in the Netherlands use these tiles for training and championships.

=== Brush materials ===
The next stage in dry ski slope development came with the brush industry. The most common material is Dendix which is a by-product of brush manufacturing and is similar to a short-haired brush with the bristles sticking upwards. Dendix is manufactured in Chepstow, however it can be found on slopes throughout the world. It is arranged in a hexagonal pattern of approximately 1-inch (25 mm) strips of bristles in a 4 in (100 mm) hexagon. Although it was a significant advancement from previous surfaces, concern over damage to slope users (it provides little or no impact protection to a slope user when falling) and ski or snowboard damage due to friction meant litigation for slopes using it was a constant threat. Nowadays water is often sprayed onto the surface of the dendix to lubricate it and increase speed; however, higher insurance premiums cause many slope operators to look for safer alternatives.

Despite more recent materials, Dendix remains the most popular plastic slope material in use.

=== Recent materials ===
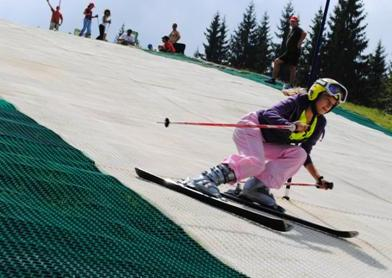
Neveplast dry ski slope

The most recent development has seen a crop of materials providing both impact protection and slope lubrication as well as the ability to perform turns, erect jumps, rails and quarterpipes and provide a ride that is closer to the feel of real snow. Neveplast is one of these, which uses a concentric arrangement of conical stems and is marketed for downhill, snowboarding and cross country skiing. Neveplast claims to be certified as having the same coefficient of friction between the surface and the ski as snow, allowing the skier a good side grip, with the same skis used on the snow, and without the need for water. The Neveplast cooling hole has a comparable diameter to the F.I.S. slalom pole standards used for training and competition in both slalom and giant slalom. Neveplast is also used for school camps. This surface is modular and flexible, used frequently also for Urban freestyle parks.

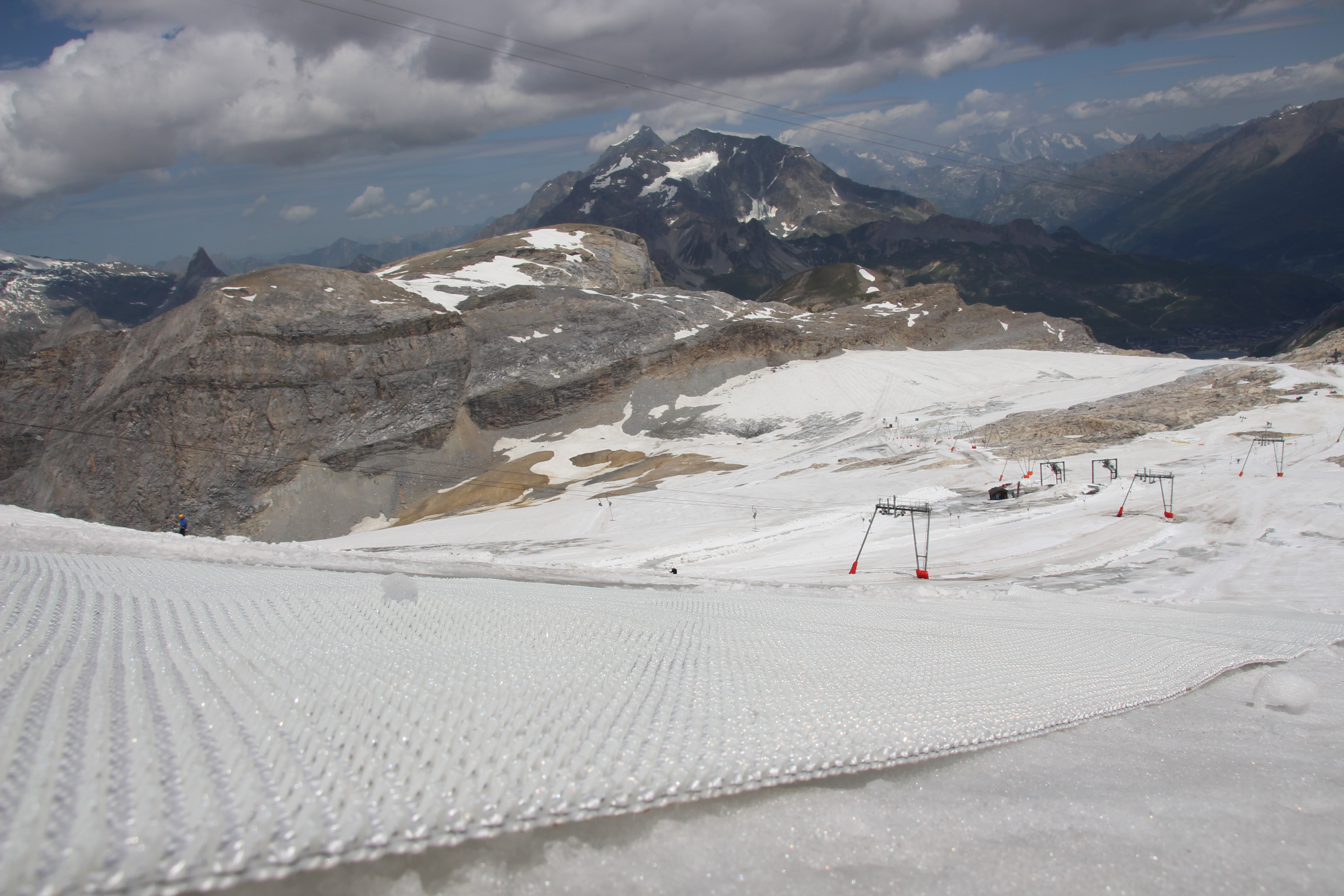
Mr. Snow dry ski slopes on the Grande Motte glacier

A German provider that guarantees year round skiing is Mr. Snow. The company produces dry slopes for downhill skiing, snowboarding and cross country skiing, along with tubing tracks and rentals for events. The material of Mr. Snow is claimed to have very good sliding capacities, is predictable in all climates and does not harm the ski or sliding surface. Mr. Snow works without the use of silicone which is not necessary to achieve good sliding characteristics. The snow carpet evidently has no negative environmental impact, so the mats can remain on the surface 365 days a year. It is also possible to remove them very quickly if it is required. Temporary using can be realized with the 20 sqm modules.

Snowflex

Another very common mat is Snowflex, manufactured near Huddersfield, West Yorkshire in England by Briton Engineering Developments Limited. Others include Perma-snow by John Nike Leisure/ Techmat 2000, also in the UK and Astroride by NorCal Extreme Sports in the United States. Snowflex and Perma-snow are both white in colour, although the former has been produced in a darker green (such as in Kendal Ski Club in Cumbria, England) to comply with planning requirements. There is no indication from NorCal Extreme Sports that AstroRide has been commercially tested to any great extent.

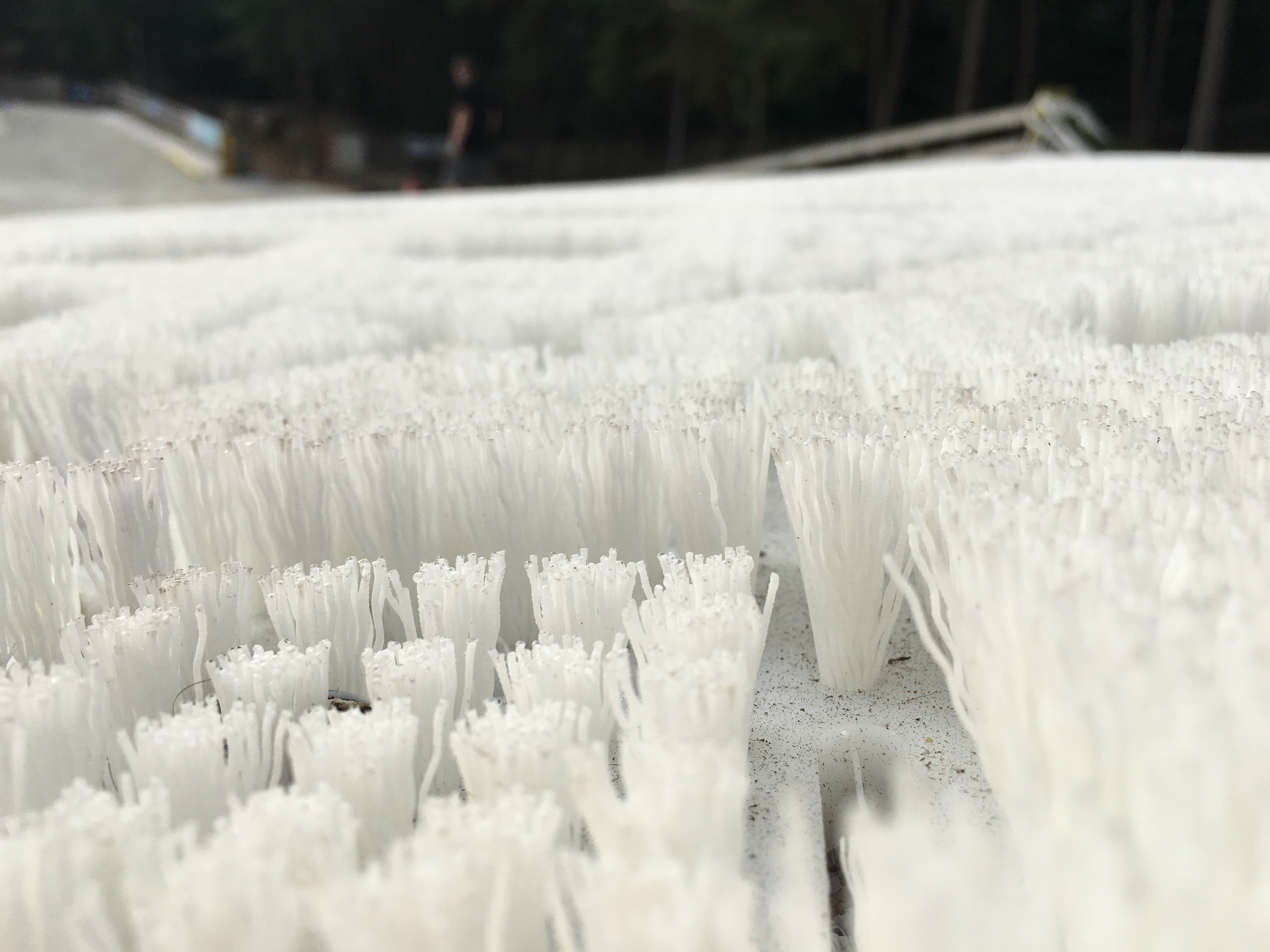
Proslope Artificial Snow Sports Matting.

UK company Proslope produces a matting with variable filament lengths to emulate the gradual edge grip and release of snow. As with some other surfaces, the system is coloured white, is modular, and works both with and without a misting system.

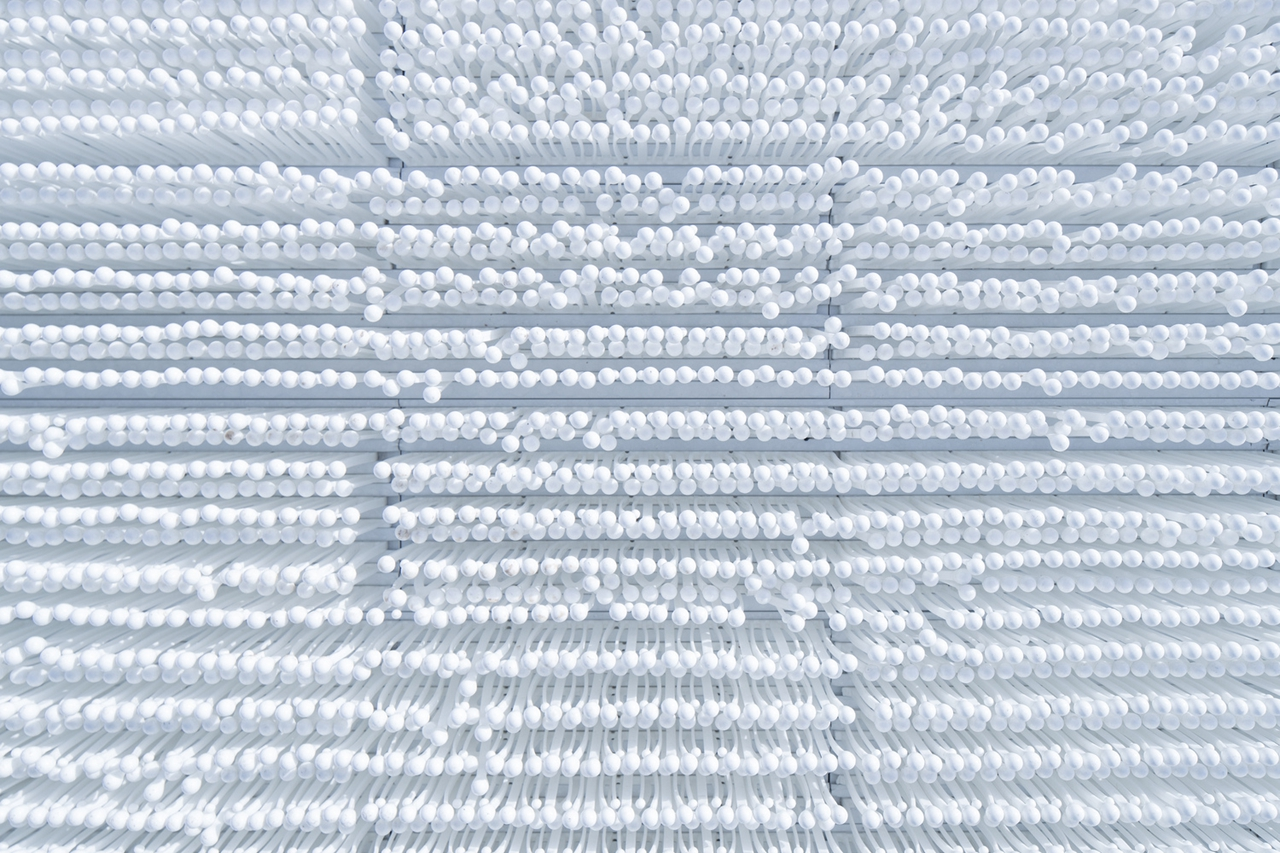
Needle mushroom dry ski mat

Enoki mushrooms are used to make dry ski slope surfaces in China. Countless thin strips with round balls on the top, resembling a mushroom-like shape, make the surface of the run-in slopes of the Training Centre airbag jumps differently from other dry slope surfaces in terms of sliding effect and safety. Its structure, friction, elasticity, safety protection, and simulation effect provide an ideal surface for airbag beginners and high-performance athletes. The surface allows the rider to either carve or skid to aid in speed control or line choice. It is possible to turn on the surface quite well, but the aim is to maintain a low edge angle and make small adjustments to create speed or set your line. This type of dry ski mat appeared for the first time at a FIS World Cup competition.

== Ski and board preparation ==
Dry slope users often improve the performance of their equipment by using the hardest grade of ski wax. The wax wears off quickly, however, and must be renewed after one or two sessions. At least one company makes a hard wax that is intended for use on dry slopes. Some users apply aerosol furniture polish or other can-based products to the bases of their skis or boards as the silicone oil it contains is reputed to reduce friction. Other substances, such as dishwashing liquid, are sometimes used.

== See also ==
- Skiing
- Snowboarding
- Indoor ski slopes
- Ski simulators
- Snowmaking
