= Biomedical Engineering: Applications, Basis and Communications =

- Discipline: Biomedical engineering
- Language: English

Publication details
- Publisher: World Scientific (Singapore)

Standard abbreviations
- ISO 4: Biomed. Eng.: Appl. Basis Commun.

Indexing
- ISSN: 1016-2372 (print); 1793-7132 (web)

Links
- Journal homepage

Biomedical Engineering: Applications, Basis and Communications is a scientific journal dedicated to basic and clinical research in the field of biomedical engineering. It is published by World Scientific. The journal covers topics such as bioelectronics, biomaterials, biomechanics, bioinformatics, nano-biological sciences and clinical engineering.

== Abstracting and indexing ==
The journal is indexed in Inspec, COMPENDEX, Scopus, EMA, EMBASE.
