= Skiing =

Recreational activity and sport using snow skis

Skiing is the use of skis to glide on snow for basic transport, a recreational activity, or a competitive winter sport. Many types of competitive skiing events are recognized by the International Olympic Committee (IOC), and the International Ski and Snowboard Federation (FIS).

== History ==
Video demonstration of a variety of ski techniques used in the 1940s.

Skiing has a history of almost five millennia. Although modern skiing has evolved from beginnings in Scandinavia, it may have been practiced more than 100 centuries ago in the Altai Mountains, according to an interpretation of ancient paintings. However, this continues to be debated.

The word "ski" comes from the Old Norse word "skíð" which means to "split piece of wood or firewood".

Asymmetrical skis were used in northern Finland and Sweden until at least the late 19th century. On one foot, the skier wore a long straight non-arching ski for sliding, and a shorter ski was worn on the other foot for kicking. The underside of the short ski was either plain or covered with animal skin to aid this use, while the long ski supporting the weight of the skier was treated with animal fat in a similar manner to modern ski waxing.

Early skiers used one long pole or spear. The first description of a skier with two ski poles dates to 1741.

Troops in continental Europe were equipped with skis by 1747, and into the 21st century many nations continue to equip and train specialized troops for ski warfare.

Skiing was primarily used for transport until the mid-19th century but, since then, it has also become a recreation and sport. Military ski races were held in Norway during the 18th century, and ski warfare was studied in the late 18th century. As equipment evolved and ski lifts were developed during the late 19th and early 20th centuries, two main genres of skiing emerged—alpine (downhill) skiing and Nordic skiing. The main difference between the two is the type of ski binding (the way in which the ski boots are attached to the skis).

== Types ==
=== Alpine ===
Also called "downhill skiing", alpine skiing typically takes place on a piste at a ski resort. It is characterized by fixed-heel bindings that attach at both the toe and the heel of the skier's boot. Ski lifts, including chairlifts, bring skiers up the slope. Backcountry skiing can be accessed by helicopter, snowcat, hiking and snowmobile. Facilities at resorts can include night skiing, après-ski, and glade skiing, usually under the supervision of the ski patrol or a ski school. Alpine skiing branched off from the older Nordic type of skiing around the 1920s when the advent of ski lifts meant that it was no longer necessary to climb back uphill. Alpine equipment has specialized to the point where it can now only be used with the help of lifts. Alpine Touring setups use specialized bindings which are switchable between locked and free-heel modes. Climbing skins are temporarily attached to the bottom of alpine skis to give them traction on snow. This permits Nordic style uphill and back-country travel on alpine skis. For downhill travel, the heels are locked and the skins are removed.

=== Nordic ===
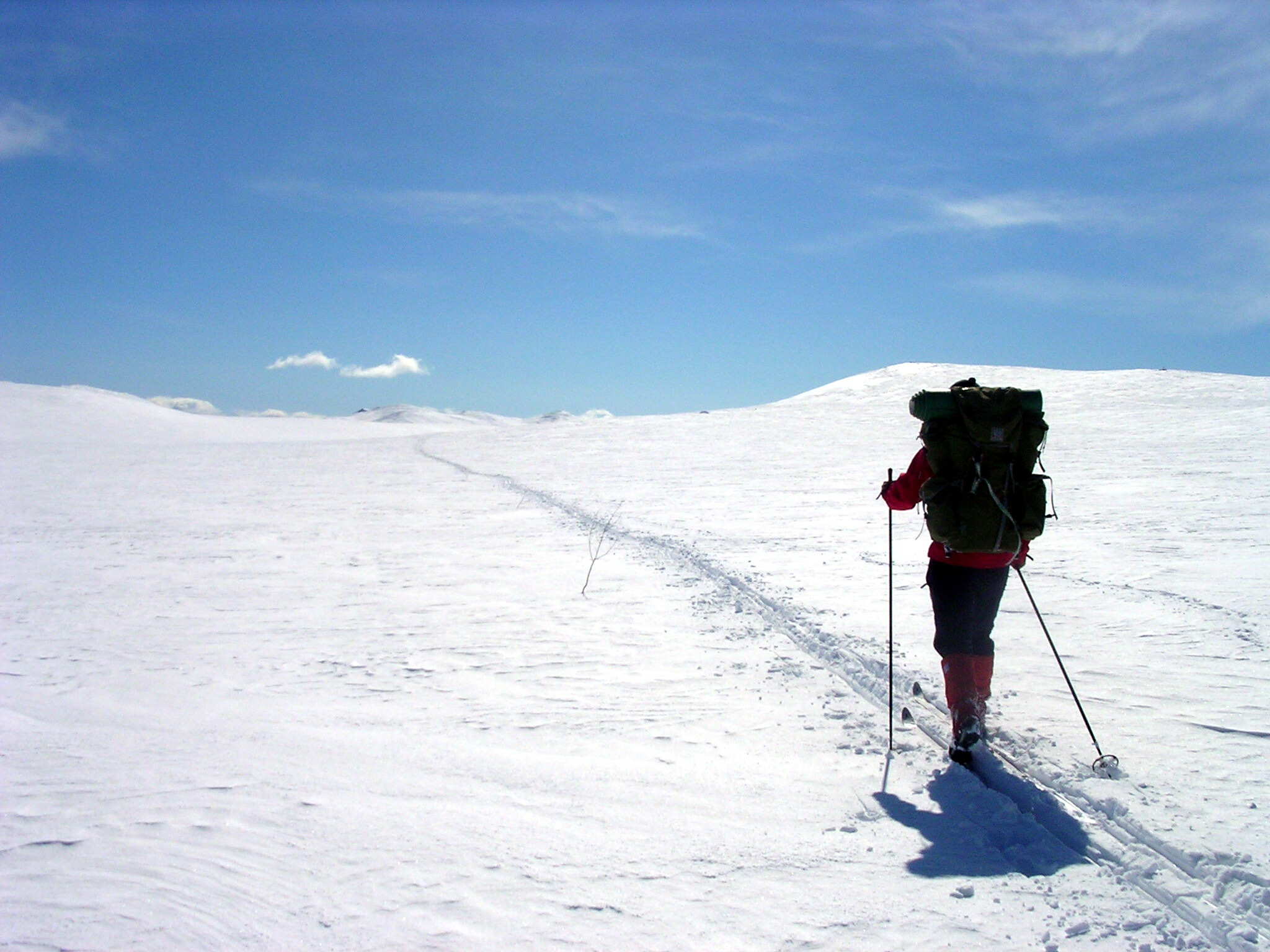
Spring ski touring on Hardangervidda, Norway

The Nordic disciplines include cross-country skiing and ski jumping, which both use bindings that attach at the toes of the skier's boots but not at the heels. Cross-country skiing may be practiced on groomed trails or in undeveloped backcountry areas. Ski jumping is practiced in certain areas that are reserved exclusively for ski jumping.

=== Telemark ===
Telemark skiing is a ski turning technique and FIS-sanctioned discipline, which is named after the Telemark region of Norway. It uses equipment similar to Nordic skiing, where the ski bindings are attached only at the toes of the ski boots, allowing the skier's heel to be raised throughout the turn. However, the skis themselves are often the same width as alpine skis.

== Competition ==
The following skiing disciplines are sanctioned by the FIS. Many have their own world cups and are included in the Winter Olympic Games.

- Cross-country – Encompasses a variety of formats for cross-country skiing races over courses of varying lengths. Races occur on homologated, groomed courses designed to support classic (in-track) and free-style events, where skate skiing may be employed. The main competitions are the FIS Cross-Country World Cup and the FIS Nordic World Ski Championships (held only in odd-numbered years), and various cross-country skiing events have been incorporated into the Winter Olympics since its inception in 1924. The discipline also incorporates: cross-country ski marathon events, sanctioned by the Worldloppet Ski Federation; cross-country ski-orienteering events, sanctioned by the International Orienteering Federation; and biathlon, a combination of cross-country skiing and rifle shooting. Paralympic cross-country skiing and paralympic biathlon are both included in the Winter Paralympic Games.
- Ski jumping – Contested at the FIS Ski Jumping World Cup, the FIS Nordic World Ski Championships (odd-numbered years only), the FIS Ski Jumping Grand Prix, and the FIS Ski Flying World Championships. Ski jumping has also been a regular Olympic discipline at every Winter Games since 1924.
- Nordic combined – A combination of cross-country skiing and ski jumping, this discipline is contested at the FIS Nordic Combined World Cup, the FIS Nordic World Ski Championships (odd-numbered years only), and at the Winter Olympics.
- Alpine skiing – Includes downhill, slalom, giant slalom, super giant slalom (super-G), and para-alpine events. There are also combined events where the competitors must complete one run of each event, for example; the Super Combined event consists of one run of super-G and one run of slalom skiing. The dual slalom event, where racers ski head-to-head, was invented in 1941 and has been a competitive event since 1960. Alpine skiing is contested at the FIS Alpine Ski World Cup, the FIS Alpine World Ski Championships (held only in odd-numbered years), and the Winter Olympics. Para-alpine skiing is contested at the World Para Alpine Skiing Championships (odd-numbered years) and the Winter Paralympics.
- Speed skiing – Dating from 1898, with official records beginning in 1932 with an 89-mile-per-hour (143 km/h) run by Leo Gasperi, this became an FIS discipline in the 1960s. It is contested at the FIS Speed Ski World Cup, and was demonstrated at the 1992 Winter Olympics in Albertville.
- Freestyle skiing – Includes mogul skiing, aerials, ski cross, half-pipe, and slopestyle. The main freestyle competitions are the FIS Freestyle Skiing World Cup and the FIS Freestyle World Ski Championships (held in odd-numbered years). The discipline was first demonstrated at the 1988 Winter Olympics and was added to the Olympic programme in 1992. It became an Olympic sport in the 2014 Sochi Olympic games when the Slope-style and Half pipe events were introduced.
- Telemark – Named after the Telemark region of Norway, this discipline combines elements of Alpine and Nordic skiing. A relatively new competitive sport, Telemark racing is contested at the FIS Telemark World Cup and the FIS Telemark World Championships.
- Grass skiing – Originally developed as an alpine skiing training method, skiing on grass has become established as a skiing discipline in its own right. It is contested at the FIS Grass Skiing World Cup and the FIS Grass Ski World Championships.

== Equipment ==
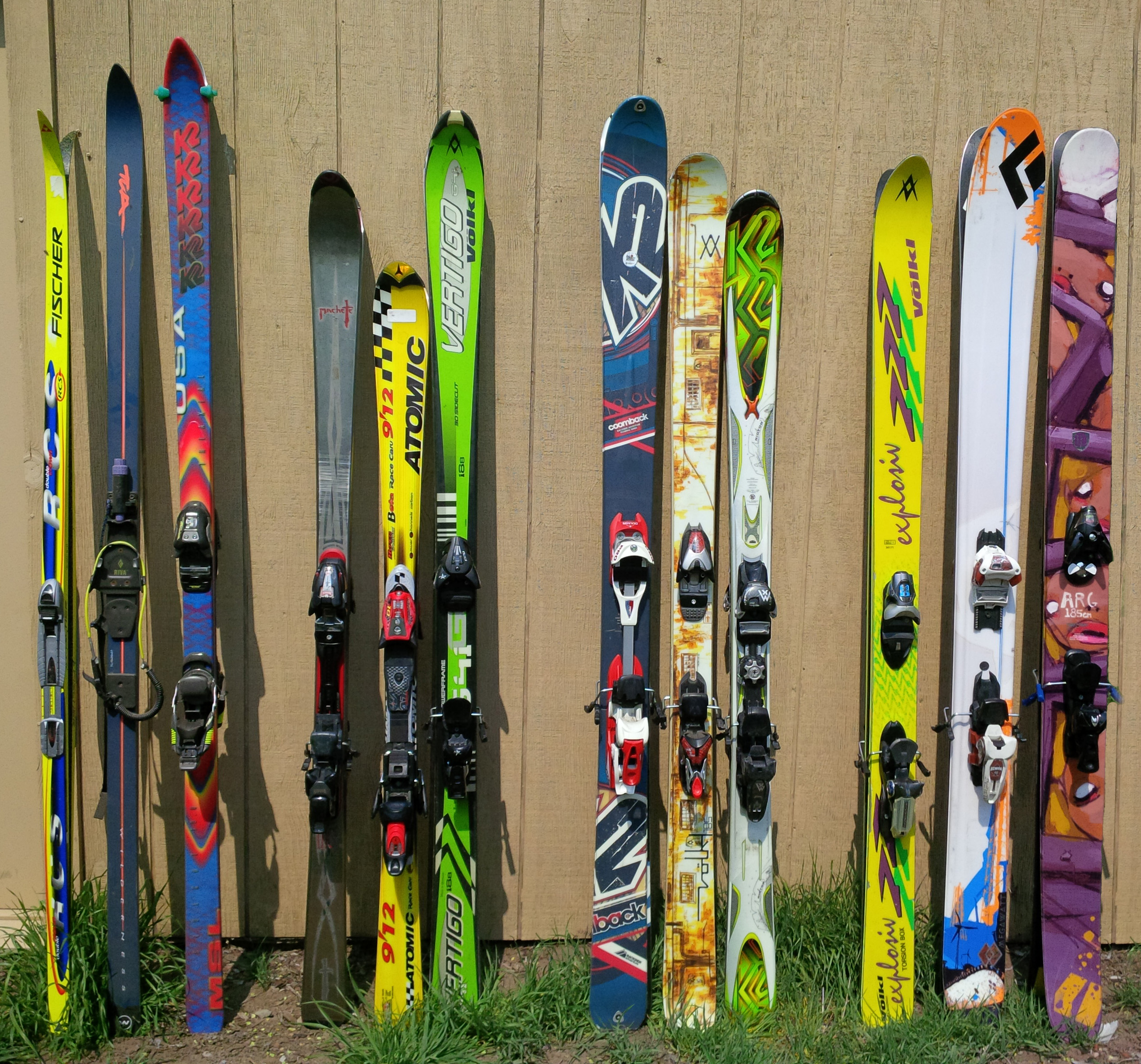
Four groups of different ski types, from left to right: 1. Non-sidecut: cross-country, telemark and mountaineering 2. Parabolic; 3. Twin-tip; 4. Powder

Equipment used in skiing includes:

- Skis, which may have skins applied or be textured for uphill traction or wax applied for minimizing sliding friction. Twin-tip skis are also designed to move forwards or backwards.
- Boots and bindings
- Poles
- Helmets
- Ski suits
- Ski goggles
- Skiing gloves
- Ski masks

== Technique ==
Technique has evolved along with ski technology and ski geometry. Early techniques included the telemark turn, the stem, the stem Christie, snowplough, and parallel turn.

New parabolic designs like the Elan SCX have enabled the more modern carve turn.

== On other surfaces ==
Originally and primarily an outdoor winter sport on snow, skiing is also practiced on synthetic "dry" ski slopes, on sand, indoors and with ski simulators. With appropriate equipment, grass skiing and roller skiing are other alternatives which are not performed on snow.

== Gallery ==
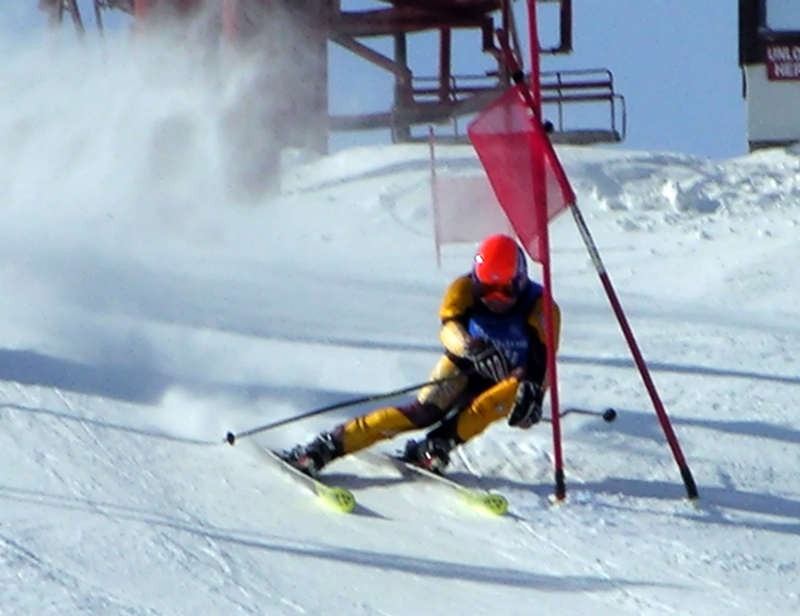
Giant Slalom Ski Racer

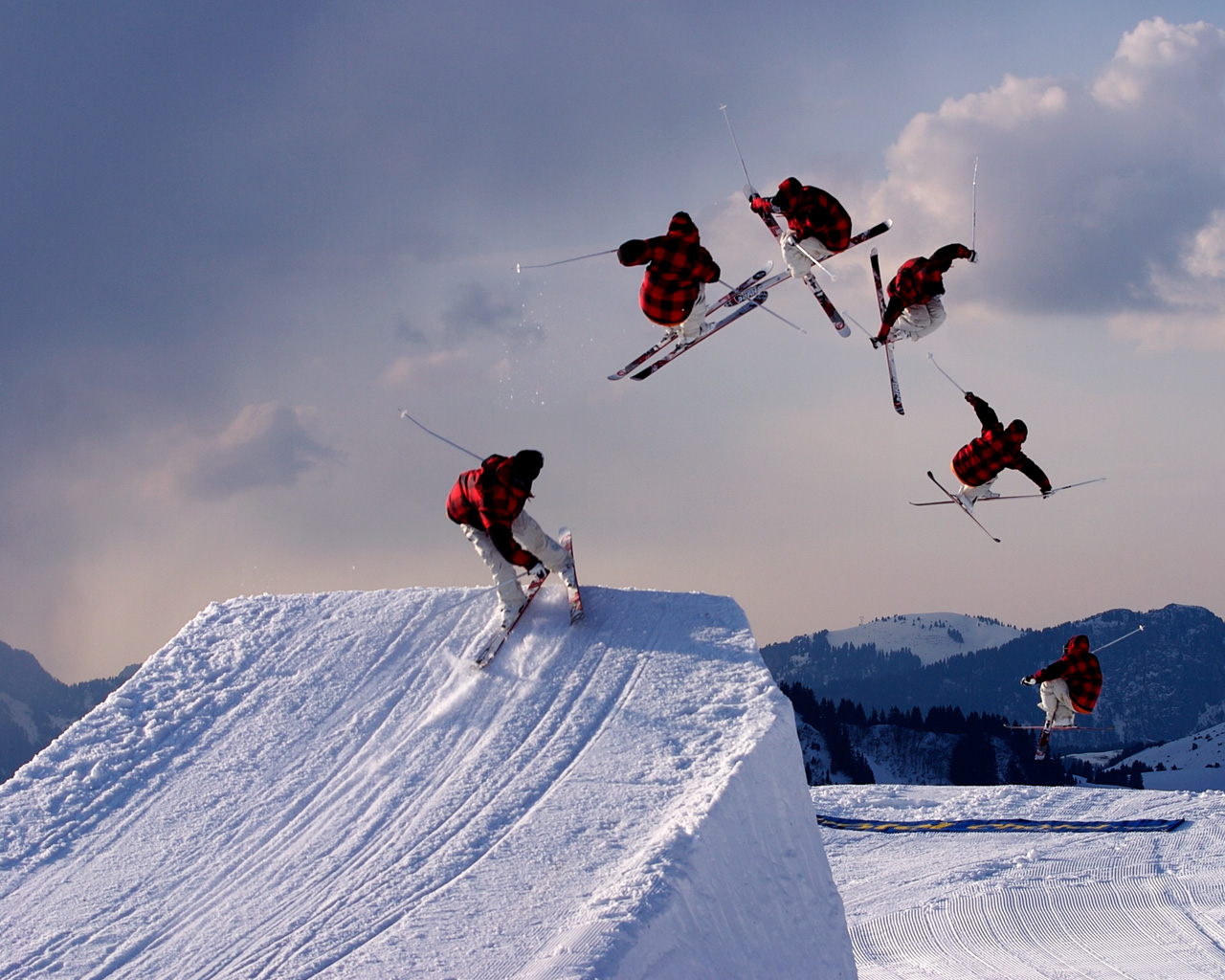
Freestyle switch 720 mute grab

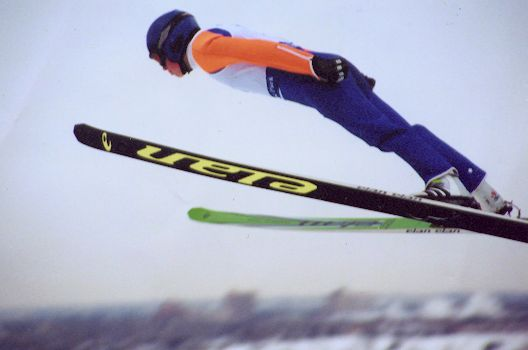
A ski jumper using the V-style

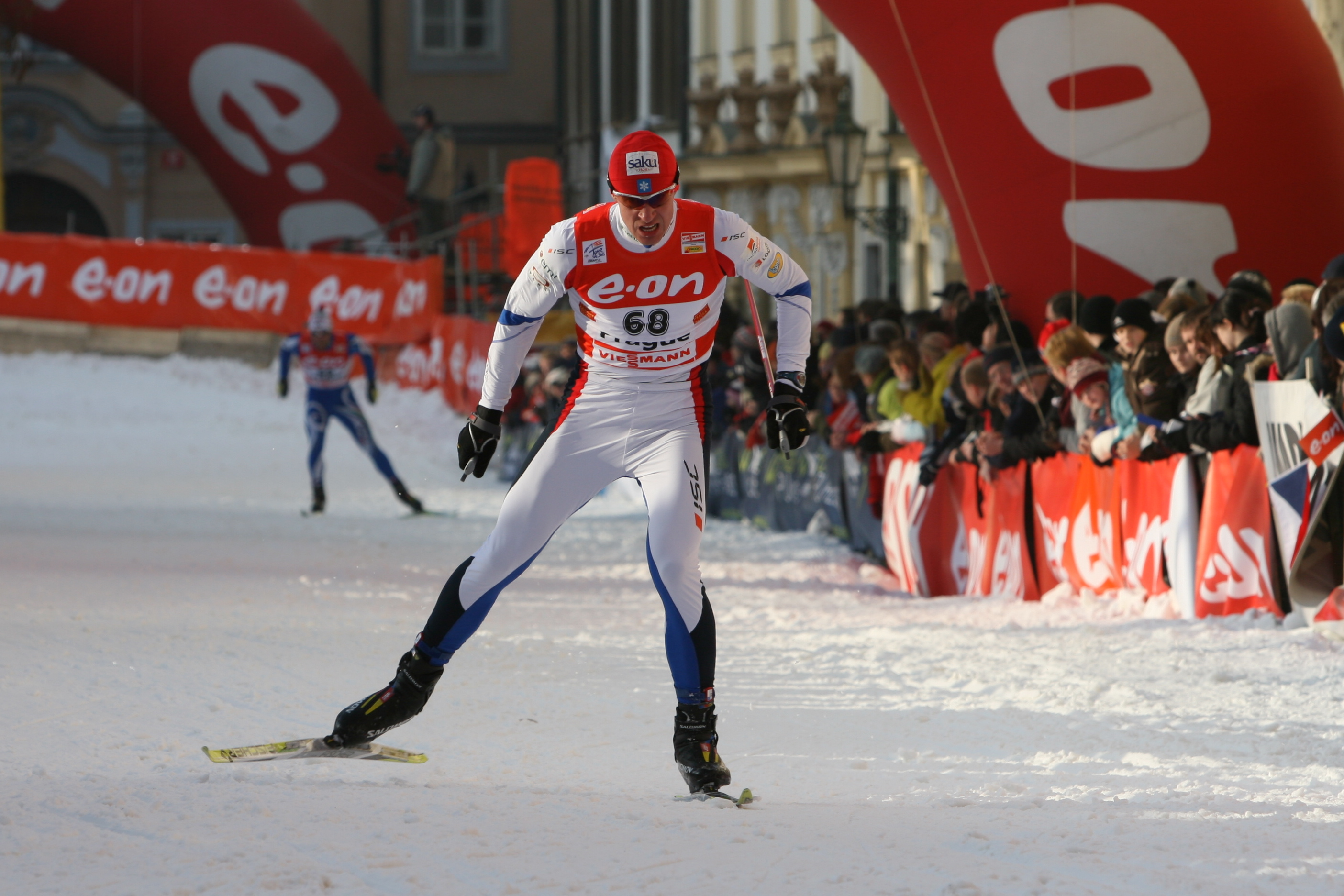
Cross country skiing—free-style or skate-skiing

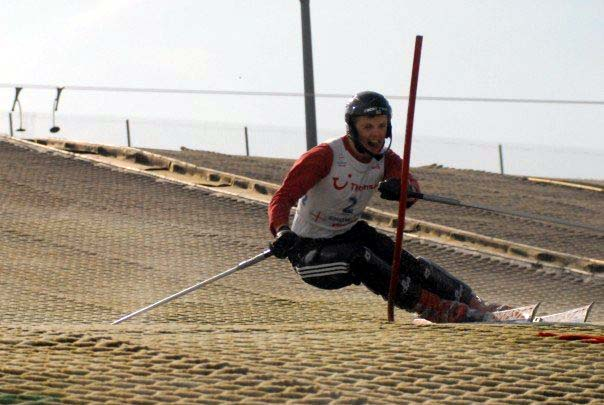
Dry slope racing

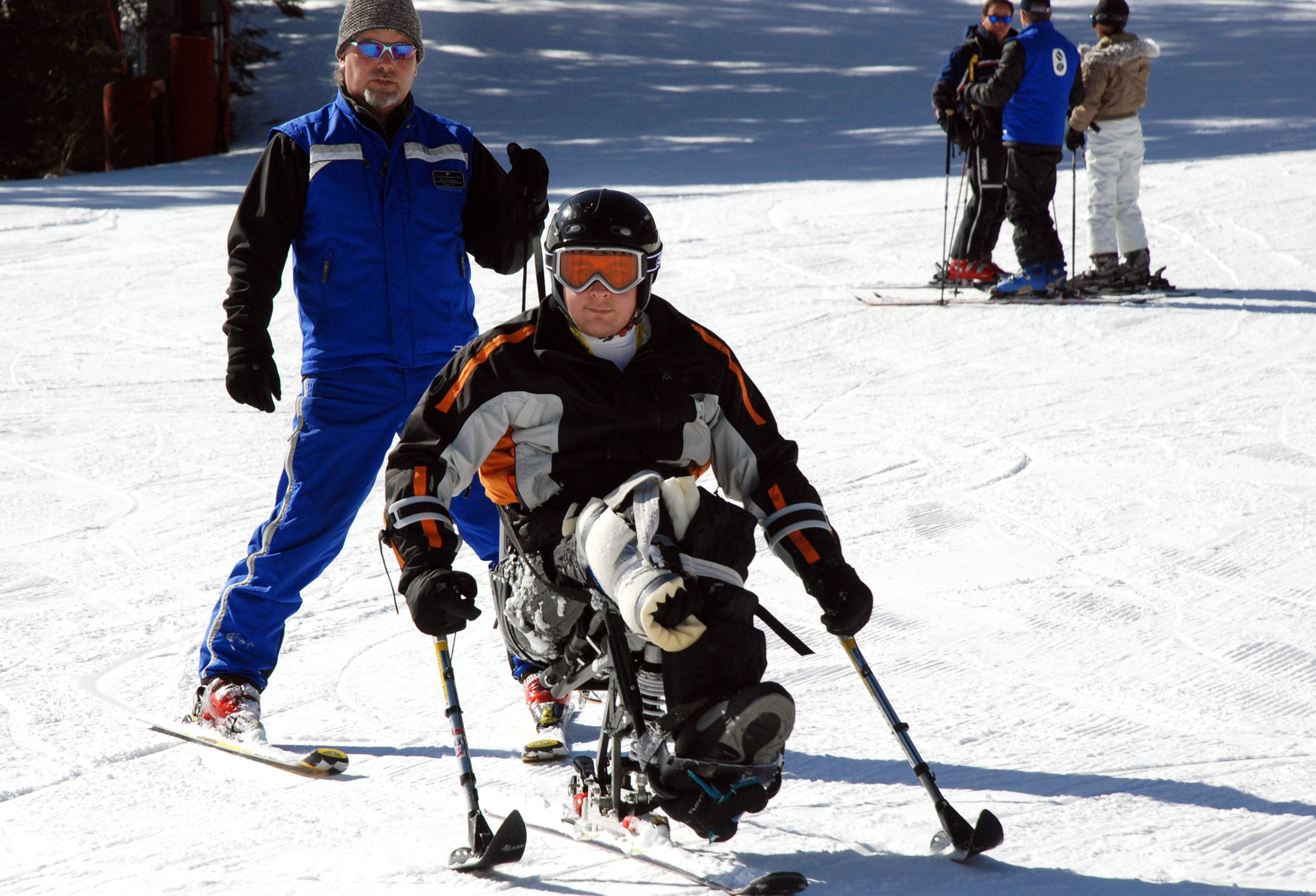
A skier with a disability on a sit-ski, using two outriggers.

== See also ==
- Glossary of skiing and snowboarding terms
