= Carved turn =

Skiing and snowboarding technique

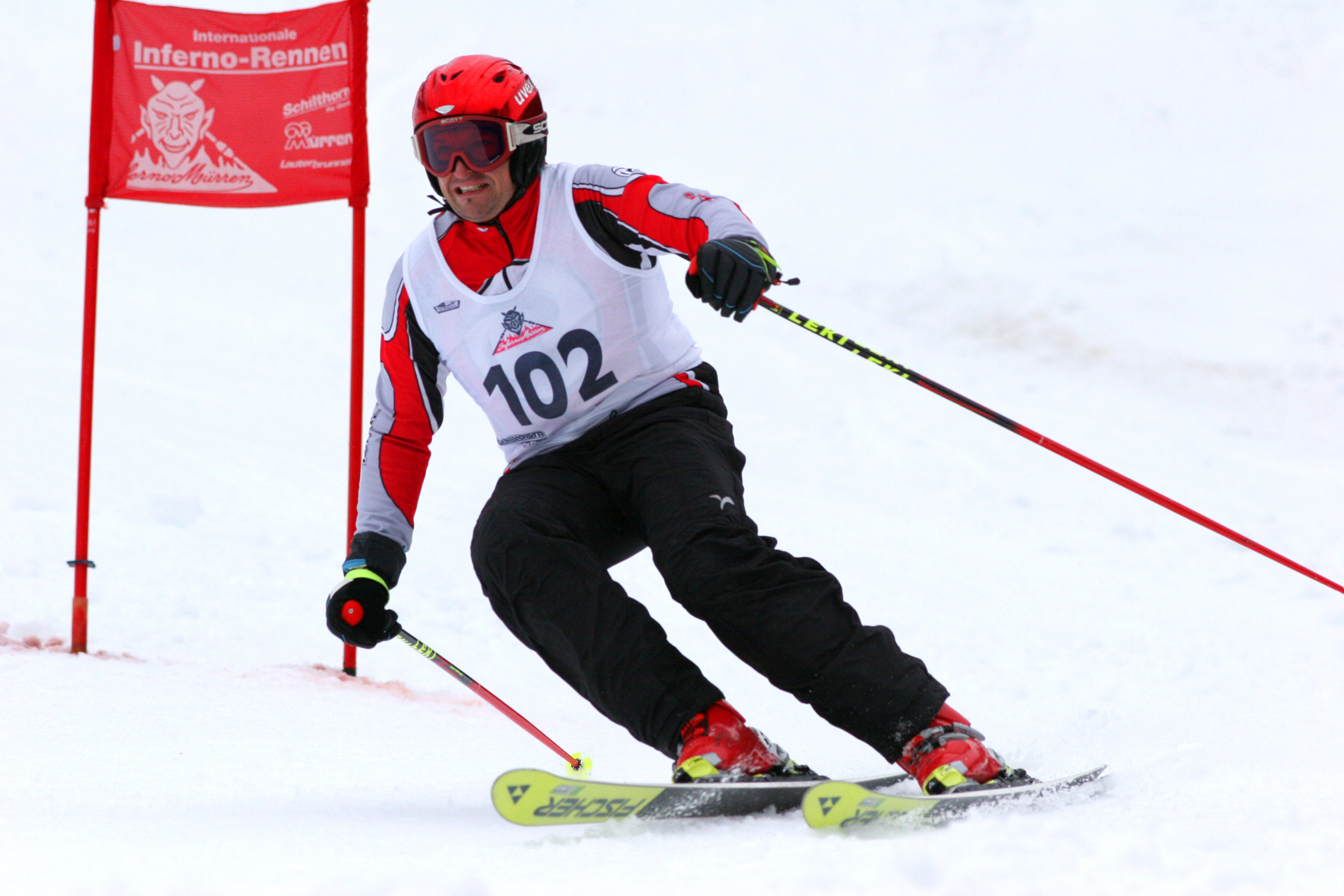
Skier making a carved turn

A carved turn is a skiing and snowboarding term for the technique of turning by shifting the ski or snowboard onto its edges. When edged, the sidecut geometry causes the ski (in the following, snowboard is implicit and not mentioned) to bend into an arc, and the ski naturally follows this arc shape to produce a turning motion. The carve is efficient in allowing the skier to maintain speed because, unlike the older stem Christie and parallel turns, the skis do not create drag by sliding sideways.

Starting a carved turn requires the ski to be rotated onto its edge, which can be accomplished through angulation of the hips and knees applied to both skis, leading them to efficiently carve a naturally parallel turn. Carving turns are generally smoother and longer radius than either stemmed or parallel turns. Carving maintains the skis efficiently turning along the direction of travel as opposed to skidding at an angle across the direction of travel. For a given velocity, carving with shaped skis typically requires less effort than stemming or parallel and offers increased speed and control in even steep descents and highly energetic turns, making it ubiquitous in racing.

Prior to the introduction of "shaped skis" in the 1990s, the technique was not simple to learn. Since then, it has become accessible and carving is commonly taught as a form of parallel skiing alongside the classic parallel "brushed" technique. Modern downhill technique is generally a combination of carving and skidding, varying the ratio between the two when rapid control over the turn or speed is required. Pure carving is a useful technique on "groomers" – slopes of moderate steepness with smooth snow – with skis dedicated to this style. Other situations remain almost pure parallel Christie technique, such as competitive mogul skiing, with edged turn initiation aided by the moguls themselves.

== History ==
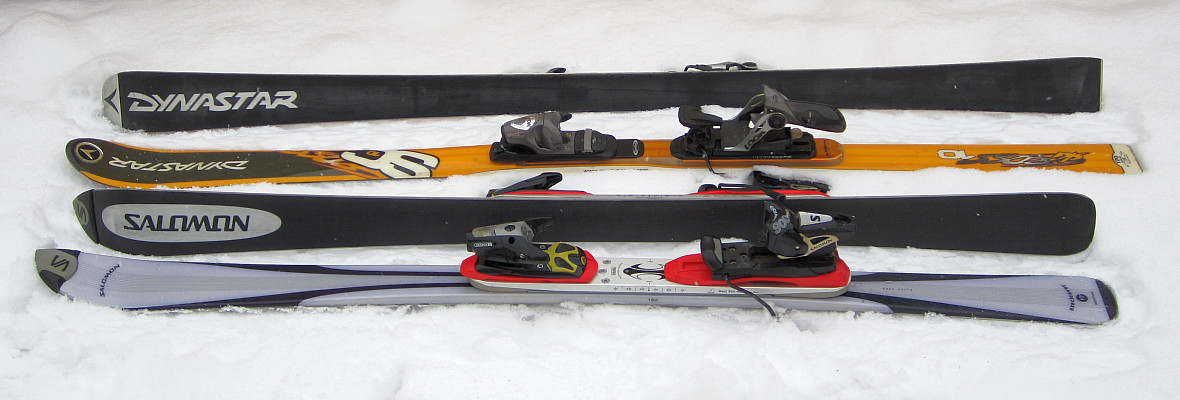
Parabolic skis are designed to facilitate carved turns.

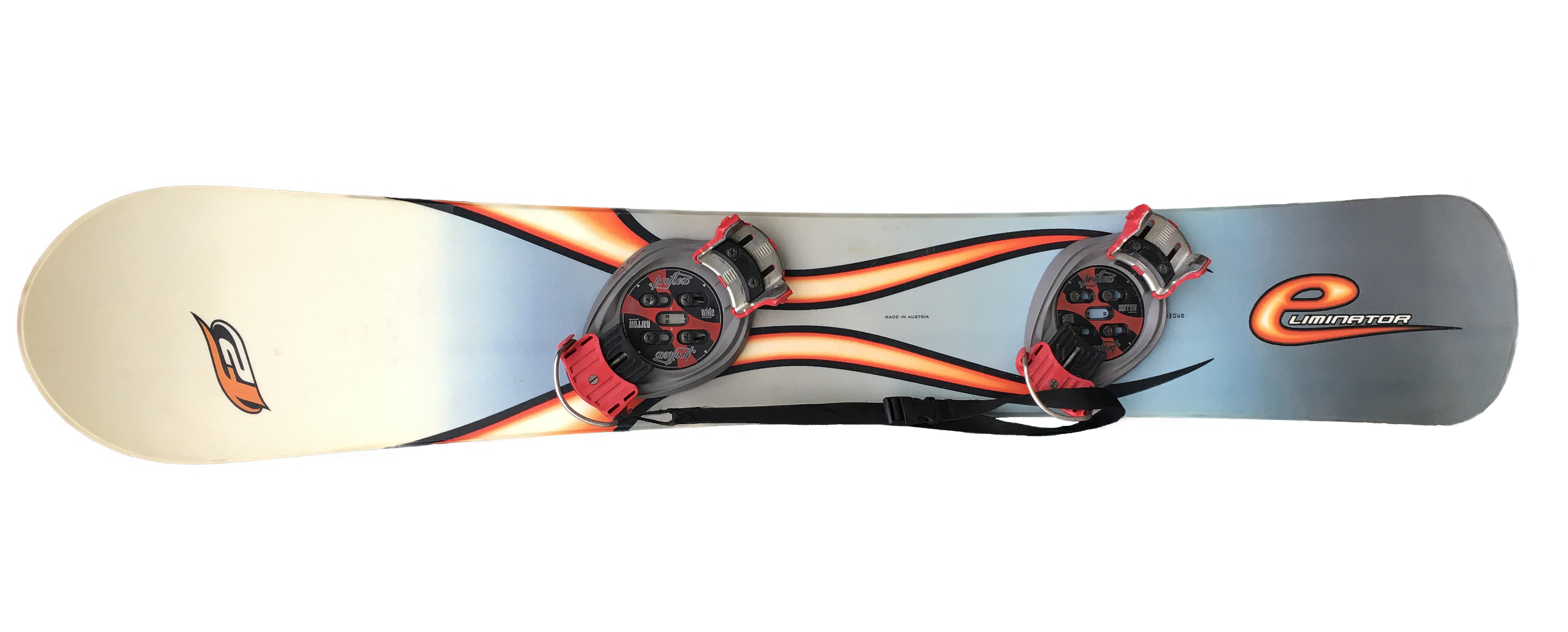
Snowboard from F2 designed for carving and thus having a mid section more narrow than the end sections, early 2000s

Shaped skis, also called parabolic skis, make carved turns possible at low speeds and with short turn radius. Skis had sidecut since they were first carved from wood – typically around 5mm on a long ski. But it wasn't until the early 1980s that much deeper cuts were explored. In 1979 Head developed the "Natural Turning Radius" concept and skis with 7.3mm sidecut (~35 m radius). Olin Corp developed a teaching ski with an 8 m radius (31mm sidecut) and the first asymmetric ski, with no up hill cut and, because side cut involves proportionately wide tips, a platform for the boot to allow a very narrow waist. A total of 150 pairs were produced.

In 1990 Volkl released their metal "Explosiv" with a 10-mm sidecut and 28-m turn radius. K2 introduced a 10mm sidecut race ski, whose improved edging and turning ability became a sought after by consumers. Volant released a 12mm cut ski in 1992, followed by Dynastar, and K2.

Elan engineers Jurij Franko and Pavel Skofic experimentally adjusted sidecut and developed a physical model—desired radius, speed, forces and lean one could generate, and bend the ski to solve for this combination. By 1991 they released a ski with a sidecut that was, at 22.25 mm, three times that of previous standard for slalom skis and a tight, 15–m turning radius. It took eight of the top ten places in its initial racing, allowing skiers to stand with a stronger straighter leg and make the desired carve. In the US, ski instructors found that students could easily make parallel turns that would otherwise take considerable practice and training. The company put the ski on the market in 1993 as the Elan SCX.

Kneissl, struggling in bankruptcy released a radical 19–mm sidecut ski for a radius of 14 m. In tests, Elan found that its skis substantially boosted skier capability. Engineers experimented and were funded at Atomic, Blizzard and others. With cuts of 20 mm, short skis were a necessity to avoid unnecessarily heavy tips and tails. Increasing widths held snow contact constant as lengths and turn radius plummeted. The necessary tip and tail mass as well as carved edge contact made 180 cm skis as stable as straight skis 20% longer. Design challenges such as engineering increased stiffness to keep wide tips from bending over bumps and in deeps continued to be met as Wright's law took over ski design.

Some (Atomic, Fischer and Head) leaped at the new designs while others resisted (Rossignol/Dynastar, K2) or took other directions (Salomon with their incredibly successful cap or “monocoque” design). The expense of competing against the dual innovations of the new carving skis and radical manufacturing innovation such as the cap, and investment in new presses to handle the width of carving skis saw several companies go to the wall, including Blizzard, while innovators such as the Slovenian Elan company thrived combining new manufacturing with “parabolic” ski design. In 1994 K2 launched its K2 Fours: a 22 meter radius 195 cm downhill ski. In 1996 Bode Miller took multiple wins. The market shifted dramatically, with "old" skis piling up, unsalable even in clearance racks.1996 was also the year when Skis Lacroix presented the first Parabolic ski in France, called "Morpho". Designed by J.B. and H.M., it was based on an asymmetric construction, featuring one left ski and one right ski. The inside and outside lines of the ski were different, being "asymmetric" to compensate for the shorter distance the inside ski had to cover compared to the longer one for the outside ski. These skis exhibited amazing carving speed in giant slalom when used properly. A couple of years later, Atomic copied the concept and created their own ski called "Differential". Although these skis would still win races today, they were not used to their full potential as nobody used them as they should be.

== Dynamics ==
Skis bend when edged (angling of the ski running base to the snow surface). Combined with sidecut, this creates a curved interface to the snow, and at a turn of that radius, the ski carves, rather than skids, with all points of the edge of the ski traveling along the same curve on the snow surface. These basic physical facts drive the radical parabolic sidecut.

When making a carving turn, a skier is skiing in dynamic equilibrium, so to balance the centripetal force the skier brings their center of mass to the inside of the turn. This is like a cyclist leaning to the inside of a turn to avoid being thrown off of their bicycle. Beginners to the sport are often hesitant to angulate into these turns, as they feel that such an action will cause them to fall. Ski instructors therefore teach new skiers to overcome this hesitation.

The ski is made with a side-cut radius. This is the radius of a circle that would fit into the shape of the edge of the ski if viewed in plan-view. This is approximately the maximum radius of turn that can be cleanly carved. Expertly used skis are capable of carving clean circular arc segments whose approximate minimum radius is proportional to the cosine of the angle of tilt multiplied by the side-cut radius.

== Path ==
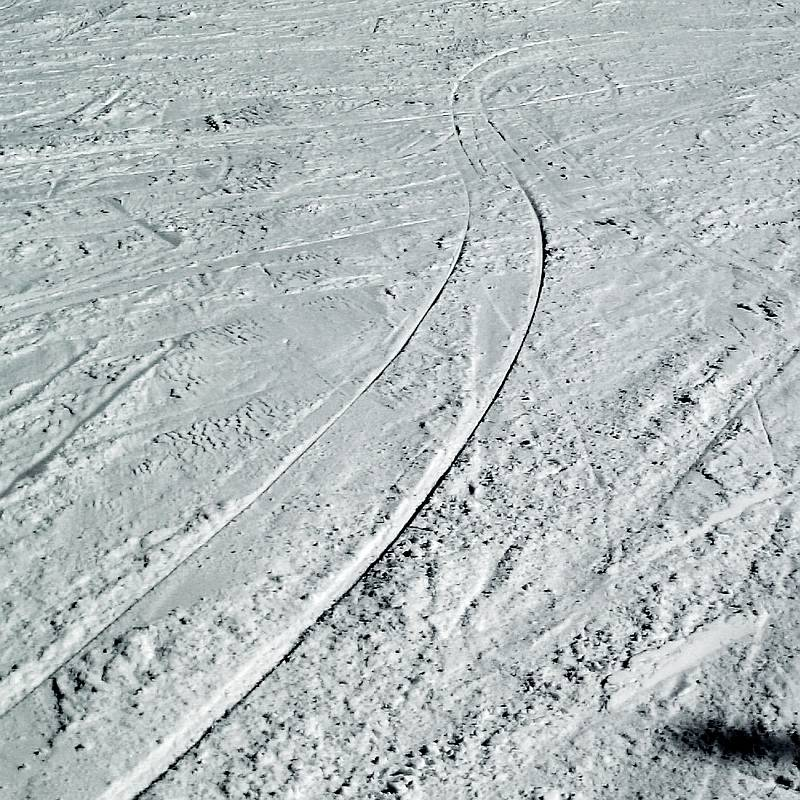
Tracks of carved turns in the snow, showing transition from one side of the ski to the other.

Carving typically involves the skier making a series of "Cs", or half circles, down the hill (with two consecutive "C"s forming an "S"). Skidding turns on the other hand would rather follow a Z-shaped path.

Some instructors teach their students to think of these half circles as a clock. For example, the most extreme left portion of a turn would be at 9 o'clock and the extreme right is 3 o'clock. The turns are accomplished by utilizing a "rolling" of both skis from edge to edge.

== Speed ==
Recreational skiing is usually done at speeds in range between 5 m/s and 15 m/s with average turn radius of less than 15 m. Accordingly, sidecuts of modern recreational skis are calculated for turn radius of approximately 7 to 15 m.

Unlike a skidding turn, which primarily uses the skidding effect to reduce speed (hence the "Z"-path), a (perfect) carved turn does not lose any speed because there is no braking action in the turns. Rather, the reduction of the average path slope angle resulting from the skier's S-shaped path down the slope, as opposed to a path straight down, reduces the skier's speed. The skier wishing to go slower must wait a little longer before initiating the next C-turn, making the "C" longer. This will lead the skier to ski more across the slope (in extremes uphill), reducing the average path slope angle.

== Snowboarding ==
Snowboarder practicing carving on a hard slope, equipped with a boardercross board and hard boots

A carved turn is distinguishable by its subsequent "pencil line" mark left in the snow. This indicates that only the edge of the board made contact with the snow, and no skidding took place during the turn. The rider is using pressure, twist and tilt to get only the side of the board into the snow. Then engaging the sidecut edge which determines the carved turn shape. This type of turn causes the board to bend and store a large amount of potential energy during the turn. Allowing this potential energy to be released and then used to propel the boarder into the next turn. The act requires the snowboarding skills of twist, tilt, and pressure to engage the edge into the snow and start the turn. No pivoting should be involved while the edge of the board is engaged with the snow as it will cause skidding, or the edge to release from the snow.

== See also ==
- Glossary of surfing
