= Ski geometry =

Methods for snow ski construction

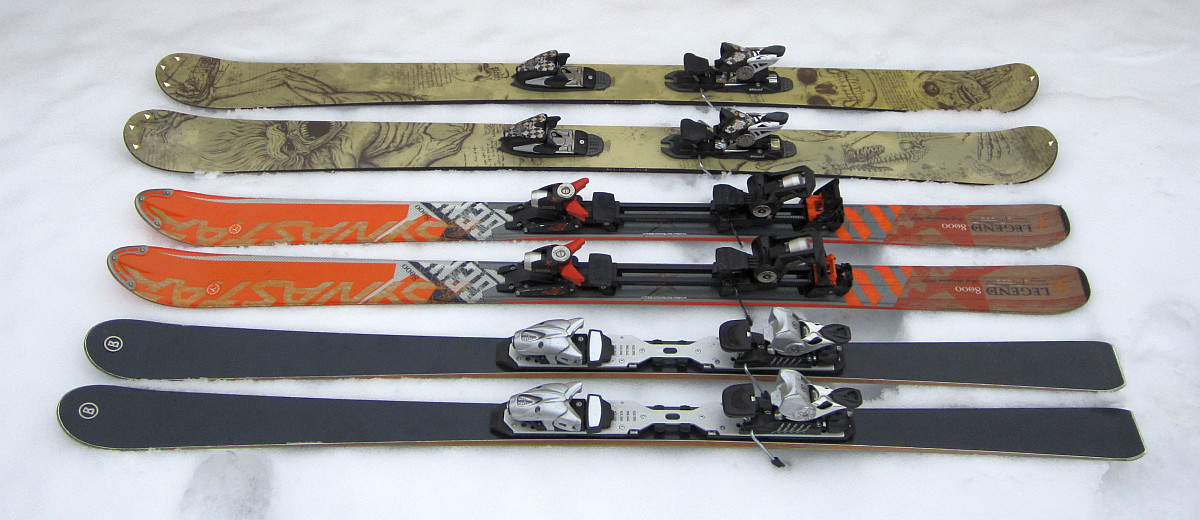
Different geometry at skis for backcountry skiing (top), all mountain skis and on-piste skis for carved turns.

Ski geometry is the shape of the ski. Described in the direction of travel, the front of the ski, typically pointed or rounded, is the tip, the middle is the waist and the rear is the tail. Skis have four aspects that define their basic performance: length, width, sidecut and camber. Skis also differ in more minor ways to address certain niche roles. For instance, skis for moguls are much softer to absorb shocks from the quick and sharp turns of the moguls and skis for powder are much wider to provide more "float" in deeper, softer snow.

== Length and width ==
The length and width of the ski define its total surface area, which provides some indication of the ski's float, or ability to remain on top of the snow instead of sinking into it. Cross-country skis must be narrow to reduce drag, and thus must be long to produce the required float. Alpine skis are generally not designed to reduce drag, and tend to be shorter and wider. Skis used in downhill race events are longer, with a subtle side cut, built for speed and wide turns. Slalom skis, as well as many recreational skis, are shorter with a greater side cut to facilitate tighter, easier turns. For off-piste skis the trend is towards wider skis that better float on top of powder snow. The ski width of all-mountain and off-piste skis has generally increased since the 1990s when 85 mm width was considered a wide powderski. From 2010 and onwards, many well known ski manufacturers sell all-round freeride skis for the general public starting in the 90mm range and going up to 120 mm or more.

== Tips and tails ==
The tip of the ski often strikes the snow and is normally curled upward in order to ride over it. Tips were pointed for much of the history of skiing, but the introduction of wider shaped skis has led to a change to more rounded shapes.

Tails were, and often remain, straight cut. For freestyle skiing, where the skier is often skiing backwards, it is common to have a "twin-tip" design with the tail of the ski rounded and curled up like the nose so that it skis the same in both directions.

One design note that makes a periodic comeback is the "swallowtail" design, where a notch, often V-shaped, is cut out of the rear of the ski. This makes the tail into two independent fingers. When turning, only one edge of the ski is in contact with the snow, and in a traditional ski design, this pressure causes both the turning force as well as a torsional force on the ski, making it want to flatten out on the snow and lose the edge. The swallowtail allows the two tips to move independently, reducing this torsional force and, in theory, keeping the edge in firm contact.

== Camber and rocker ==
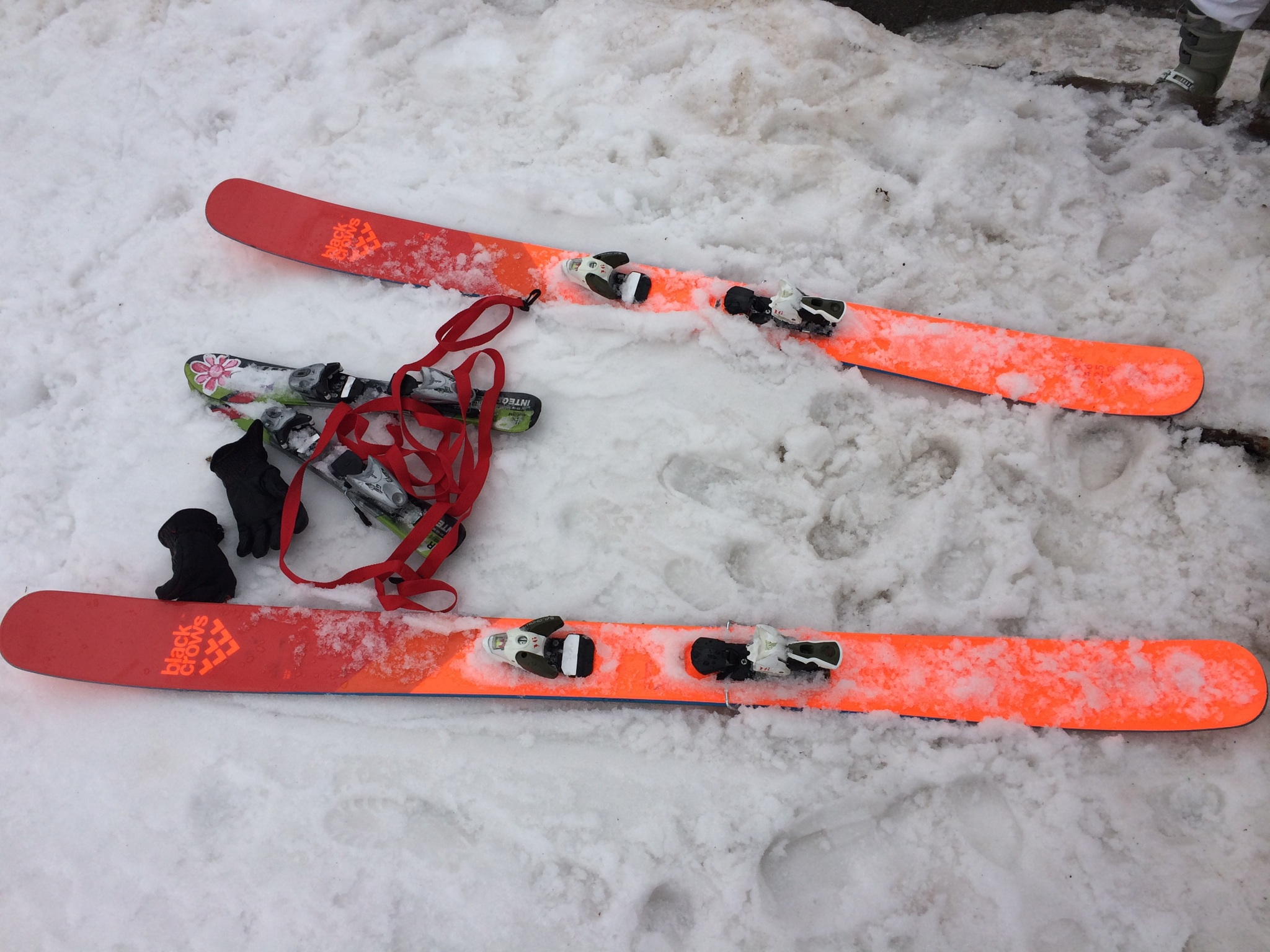
Modern powder skis are much wider than on-piste designs. This example has noticeable rocker shaping at the tip and tail, while retaining some camber and sidecut.

Camber is the ski's shape as viewed from the side. Typically skis are designed so that when the tip and tail are on the ground, the waist is in the air. Without camber, when the skier's weight is applied at the waist, the weight would be distributed on the surface closest to the foot, diminishing along the length. Camber distributes weight onto the tips and tails, extending the surface area bearing the skier's weight, and thereby improving the amount of ski edge in contact with the surface. The technique was first introduced by ski makers in Telemark, Norway, and remained largely unchanged through the 20th century. When the shape of the curve is reversed, the profile created is known as rocker (also called reverse-camber or negative-camber), on a flat surface, a rocker ski has its waist on the ground, while the tips and tails rise off the ground much earlier than they would on a traditionally cambered ski.

Today alpine skis often feature a combination of rocker and camber. This is often subtle, with natural camber at the waist, and rocker at the tip and tail. These designs often lack sidecut as well, relying on their interaction with the snow to provide the curving shape that causes the ski to turn smoothly.

One disadvantage to the parabolic shape is that it was much wider at the tip and tail, producing a design with considerable rotational inertia. To offset this effect, the skis had evolved to be much shorter, reducing the moment arm. In spite of the larger "shovels" at the tip and tail, the overall area of the ski was reduced, which led to them tending to sink in soft snow. This left powder skiing and off-piste skis among the few markets not being served by parabolic designs. Several skis aimed at the powder market had appeared over the years, including the Volant Chubb and other "fat-boy skis" from the early to mid-1990s.

Free skier Shane McConkey was skiing on the Elan designs in 1996, but found they sank in the snow. As an experiment to get more "float" on the snow, he tried mounting ski bindings on waterskis while skiing in Alaska. He began working with Volant on skis that combined their metal-based production method, producing the aluminum-based Volant Huckster. In 1998 he was testing the Huckster with his friend Scott Gaffney, who reported that his bent Chubbs skied better than the new design because the tips did not sink in the snow. McConkey took the design and used it to produce the radical Volant Spatula in 2002, which featured not only a banana-like reverse-camber but also a negative sidecut radius. On firm snow the skis were difficult to turn at all, but in powder the tips and tails bent up to produce the curved shape that caused them to carve. McConkey moved to K2 Sports and introduced the similar Pontoon design circa 2006.

By 2010 the rocker design was becoming the "in" design, and starting to displace parabolics on the larger mountains. By 2012 the change to rocker designs was well underway, and by 2013/14 almost all new skis claim to be rockers. Many of these have moderated their camber and sidecut to be more traditional, allowing them to be used on the trails as well as powder, but retain the very wide bases and other features of the rocker design. These may be referred to by any number of names depending on the brand and marketing, with terms such as "full rocker", "all mountain rocker", "hybrid" and others.

== Gender-specificity ==
Women’s skis started to appear in the 1980s. Compared to men's skis, women's skis are typically lighter in weight and limited to shorter lengths.

== Sidecut ==
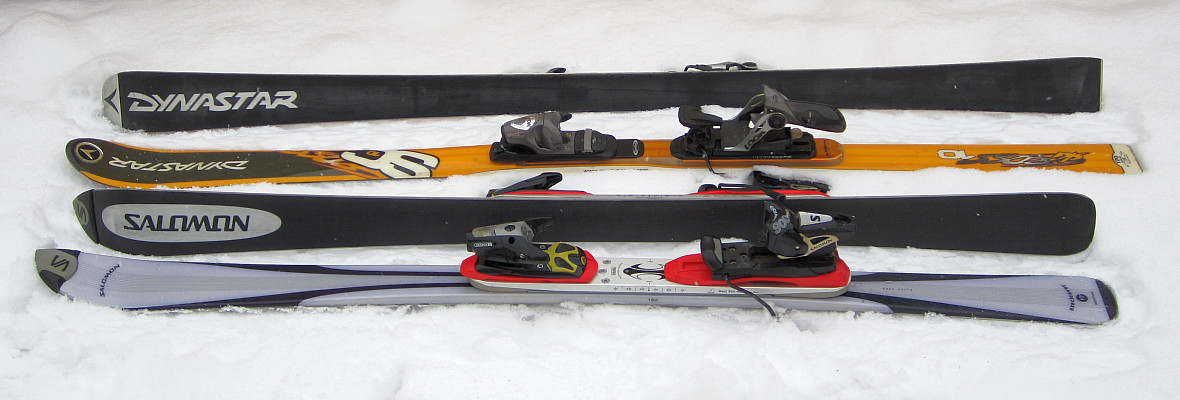
Visible hourglass shape at parabolic skis.

Sidecut is the subtle hourglass shape of the ski, viewed from the top. Skis have had some sidecut since before 1808, when it was invented by Norwegian artisans. Since that time, the straight ski with parallel edges is only used as a light cross country ski and for modern jumping skis. In alpine skis, sidecut shape has grown gradually deeper over the decades. Today deep sidecuts are used to help skis carve short, clean turns.

Many ski vendors allow selection of skis by turning radius. For a racing slalom ski, this can be as low as 12 metres and for Super-G it is normally 33 metres. Sidecut is the extent to which a ski or snowboard is narrower at the waist than at the tips. It is the arcing, hourglass-like curve that runs along a ski’s edges from tip to tail. This curve dictates how skis turn: the deeper the curve, the tighter the turn. Straighter skis with less sidecut have a larger turning radius and are more stable at high speeds. The sidecut radius is the radial measurement of the curve that matches the inner curvature of the ski, snowboard, or skiboard. For instance, with a radial sidecut, a circle with a particular radius will perfectly fit the curvature of the sidecut. This particular radius is the given specification from the manufacturer. However, it is not necessary that the radius be constant. Mathematical functions, such as a parabola or a clothoid, are often used to describe the curvature of a sidecut. Also, multiple radii are stitched together in a piecewise fashion as well.

Alpine skis have undergone three distinct changes in sidecut design. The earliest skis from the 1800s all the way to modern examples in the late 1990s featured a very small amount of sidecut that produced a ski that was almost rectangular in profile as seen from the top. Starting with the Elan SCX in 1993, and very rapidly thereafter, these designs dramatically increased sidecut, a design known as the parabolic ski, or later known as a shaped ski. With the exception of competition mogul skis, shaped skis continue to dominate wherever skis are used on packed snow or in powder with a firm base underneath. Following the introduction in 2003 of the Volant Spatula, designed by Shane McConkey, "rocker" skis became popular in the North American market. European skiers generally remained committed to full-cambered skis designed primarily for carved turns.

Snowboards and skiboards have generally had much more sidecut than alpine skis, roughly similar in layout to a parabolic ski. These designs evolved independently and were engineered from the start to select a design that produced smooth turns. Alpine skiing had previously been based on a skidding style of turns known as "stemming" that did not require much (or any) sidecut, and did not experiment with other designs as styles changed. Snowboards had to invent their equipment and techniques fresh, and found the deep sidecut was best through experimentation.

Alpine skis were for many years shaped similarly to cross-country skis, simply shorter and wider. Experiments with deeper sidecuts had been carried out with limited success, but the much deeper sidecuts of snowboards led to further experiments. In 1993 the Elan SCX introduced a radical sidecut design that dramatically improved performance of alpine skis. Other companies quickly followed the Elan SCX design, and it was realized in retrospect that "It turns out that everything we thought we knew for forty years was wrong." Since then, shaped skis have dominated alpine ski design.

=== Early ski designs ===
Early modern skis, made in Telemark, Norway by Sondre Norheim, were handmade from a single piece of hardwood and featured a relatively modest sidecut of about 4 to 5 mm. After this, advances were made in materials and construction, but in terms of shape, skis of the 1970s were largely identical to those of the 1800s.

In 1939, Dick Durrance ordered a custom ski from Thor Groswold's factory in Denver with a 7 mm sidecut, and this became a new standard for slalom skis. During the winter of 1948/49, Jerry Hiatt and Thor's son Jerry decided to experiment with even bigger sidecuts. Taking a pair of the company's standard hickory Rocket skis, they cut away wood until they produced a 15 mm sidecut. When they tried them out, they found they turned quite easily in a series of rounded turns. But this was considered poor form in the era of the stem Christie, where good form was a series of sharp J-shaped turns, and the two abandoned the design.

In any case, wooden skis of this era did not provide the torsional stiffness required to benefit from the performance sidecut now adds. Hiatt and Groswold's experiment required such a deep sidecut that the waist had little vertical stiffness, another problem for the design.

=== Snowboards ===
A radical change in design did not occur until the mid-1970s introduction of the first modern snowboards. With no previous designs to set the mould, snowboard designers had to experiment to find the right layout. The 1975 Burton Backhill had a 17 mm sidecut, giving the board a very short turning radius. The Backhill was extremely low-tech in comparison to contemporary ski designs, consisting largely of a sheet of plywood. A contemporary ski's torsion box design greatly improved torsional stiffness and would allow even greater sidecut to be effective. But in spite of the snowboard demonstrating that modern skis could carry much wider sidecuts, and that such a sidecut resulted in excellent turn performance, little came of this development. The snowboard market was ignored by the major ski companies through the 1970s and 80s.

Experiments with slightly greater sidecut on skis did appear during this period, including the Head Yahoo and especially the Atomic Powder Plus. Further developments followed due to changes in competitive giant slalom, as the gates were moved further apart and resulted in much more turning. K2 responded with the GS Race with a 10 mm sidecut, and several similar designs followed. In spite of reports that these skis were easier to turn, they were considered specialty items and the designs offered only to the race and performance markets.

One particularly notable experiment was made at Olin during the early 1980s. In 1984, one of the Olin executives asked ski designer Frank Meatto if it were possible to make a beginner's ski that would make skiing easier to learn. Meatto and co-designer Ed Pilpel decided to experiment with a radical sidecut as a way of improving turns. They designed a ski with a 31 mm sidecut, but it had tips that were 128 mm wide and they would not fit into their presses. They solved this by cutting the ski in half longitudinally, leaving the curve only on the inside edge, which powers the turn. The result was effectively one-half of the parabolic designs that would follow. The ski was so narrow underfoot that additional platforms had to be added to mount the bindings. The company produced 150 pairs to demonstrate at the SIA trade show in 1986, but no one purchased the odd-looking asymmetrical "Albert" design.

=== Shaped skis ===
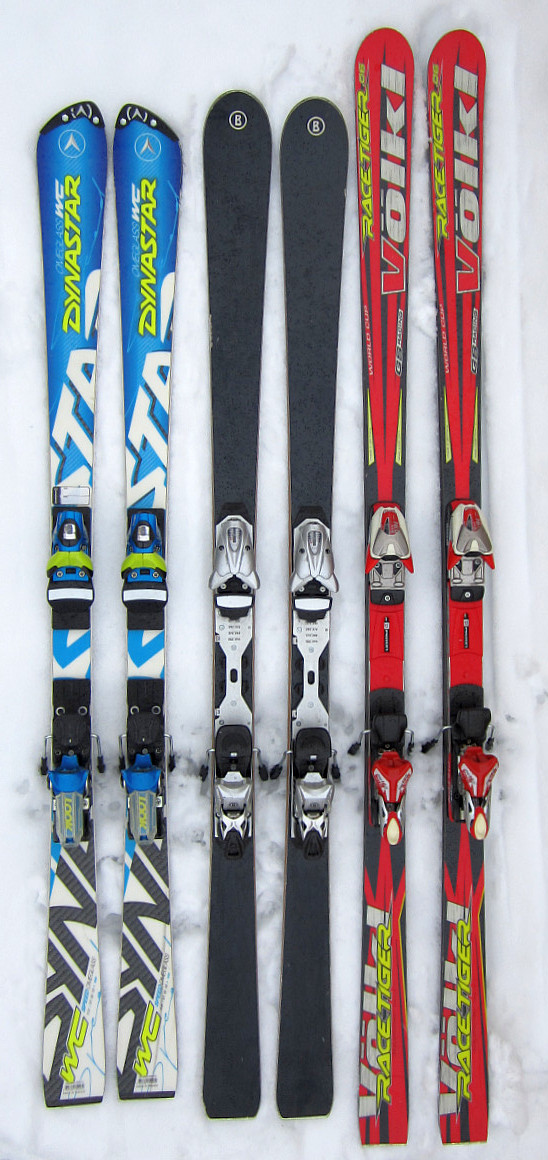
Parabolic skis for slalom racing (left) and for piste carving (middle), skis with little sidecut for giant slalom racing (right).

The company that finally drove the evolution of ski design was Elan of Slovenia. Designers at Elan produced an experimental design with screws that could be adjusted to produce different amounts of sidecut, and asked members of the company ski team to try them at different settings. This quickly demonstrated that a radically increased sidecut around 22 mm clearly improved turning performance. A series of test skis followed, which the Elan team immediately started racking up win after win on in giant slalom events.

In 1993 a number of these Sidecut Extreme (or "SCX") skis were sent to the US for testing. The results on student skiing was dramatic, and the company began designing their skis specifically for the training market. By the end of the year the improvement of the increased sidecut was obvious to everyone, and the SCX was named "ski of the year" in the trade press. By 1995 other ski companies were also making skis with increased sidecut while older designs were being sold off at pennies on the dollar in bargain bins as skiers turned en masse to the new designs. By 1997/98 the conversion was complete, and only the new designs were being produced.

Over time the name of these skis changed. When their designer, Jurij Franko, tried to describe the shape, he used the term "parabolic", which was adopted by Elan as a marketing term. The term carver soon became common as these skis were being sold largely on their ability to allow even beginners to perform the efficient carved turn. This changed again to "shaped ski" by the early 2000s, as the design was applied to a wider variety of ski types and some level of increased sidecut became universal from training skis to downhill racers.

=== Variations ===
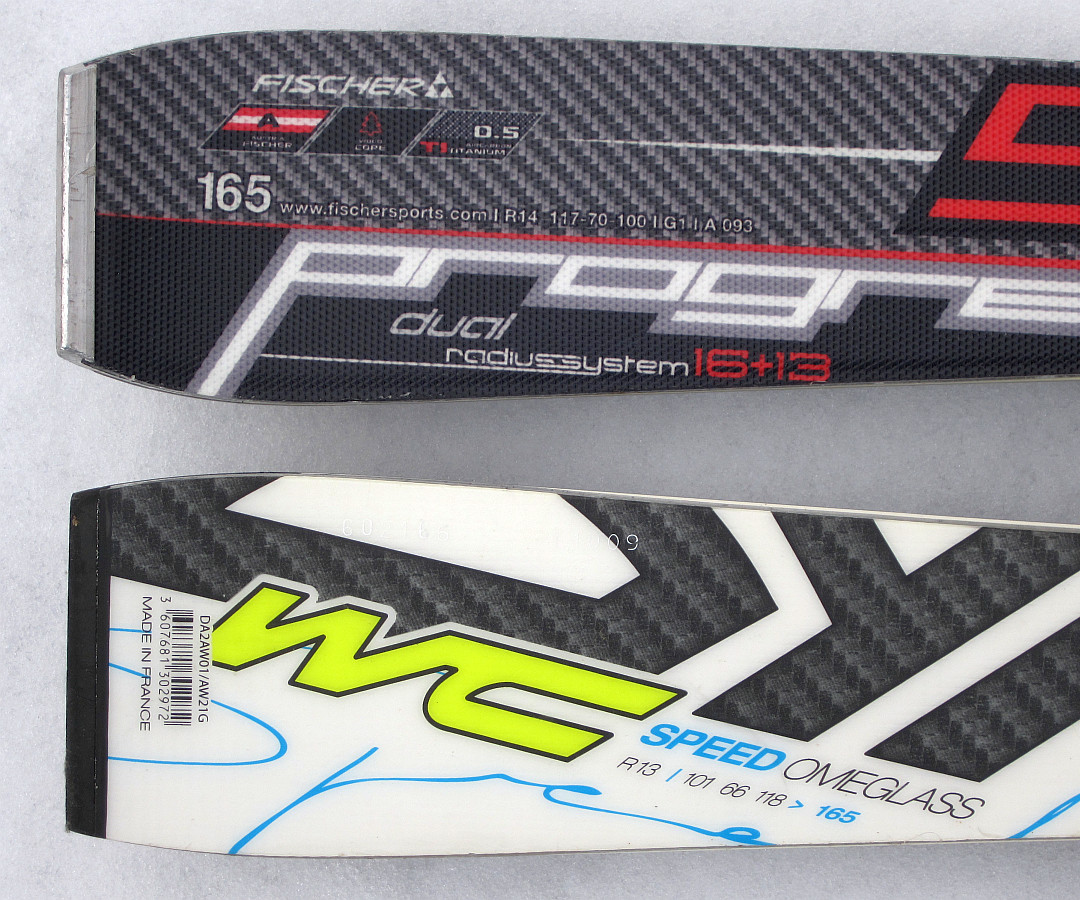
Today, radius and sidecut data is often printed on skis.

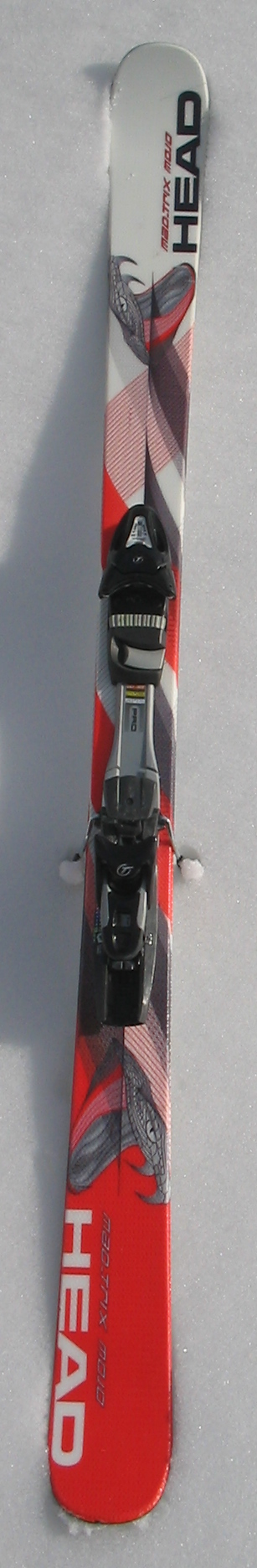
A shaped alpine ski with relatively little sidecut and classic camber: the tip and tail touch the snow while the midsection is in the air.

Different types of skis have different sidecuts. Skis with drastic sidecuts tend to make quicker sharper turns and have a smaller turn radius. For example, a world cup slalom ski would have an extremely large tip (probably around 120 mm) a narrow waist (in around 60 mm) and a large tail (slightly narrower than the tip). The drastic shape of this ski would allow it to make extremely quick turns (radius between 11 m and 14 m) without skidding. The disadvantage to a pronounced sidecut is that the ski will be less stable at high speeds, preferring short, quick turns. Also, skis with a drastic sidecut will perform poorly in moguls. Most skis have a moderate amount of sidecut. This allows reasonably fast turns (radius around 17 m on most skis) while still maintaining some stability at higher speeds. Another possibility is a very slight sidecut. This is commonly found on giant slalom skis and competition level mogul skis. The straighter sidecut allows skis to make long, fast, highly stable turns (radius around 30 m for giant slalom, even more for most mogul skis). In mogul skis, the narrow width, straighter sidecut, and light weight allow the ski to be maneuvered through the tight troughs in the bumps. Jumping skis are very wide and have virtually parallel sides, as the ski jumper is more concerned about maintaining a fast and straight trajectory, and not turning at all.

As powder-specific constructions are becoming more popular, some extremely unusual sidecuts are beginning to appear. For example, the K2 Pontoon's widest point is the tip. It then gradually gets narrower all the way down to the tail. Also, some skis like the Volant Spatula and Goode Scoop have a reverse sidecut. In a reverse sidecut, the tip and tail are a normal size, but the ski becomes extremely wide at the waist, giving it an ovaline shape. These constructions are thought to provide maximum flotation in extremely deep powder, but they are useless on hard snow. Most people, however, prefer traditional sidecuts, even in powder.
