= Ski =

Narrow strip of semi-rigid material for skiing

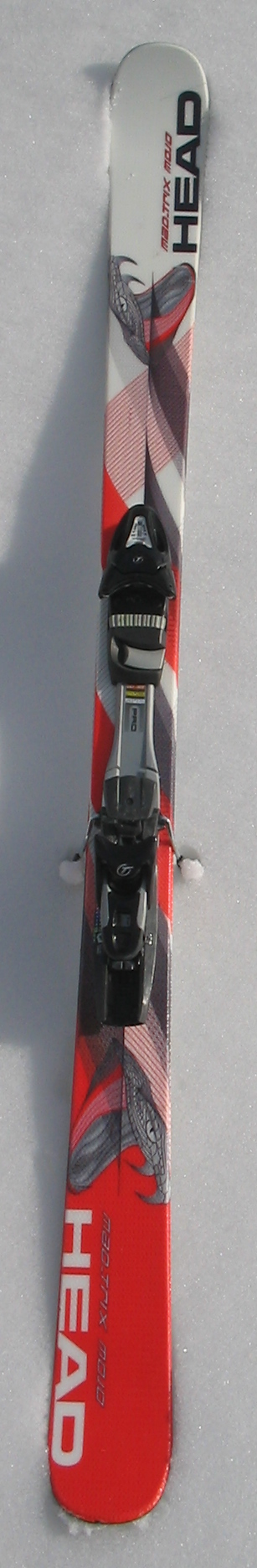
A shaped alpine ski, showing sidecut—the narrowing of the ski, near the binding.

Skis are runners that are designed to glide over snow. Skiers employ them in pairs, attached to ski boots with ski bindings, with either a free, lockable, or partially secured heel. For climbing slopes, ski skins can be affixed at the base of each ski to prevent them from sliding backwards. Originally used as a means of travel over snow, skis have become specialized for recreational and competitive alpine and cross-country skiing. Skis may also be attached to vehicles, such as aircraft or snowmobiles.

== Etymology and usage ==
The word ski comes from the Old Norse word skíð which means "cleft wood", "stick of wood", or "ski". In Old Norse common phrases describing skiing were fara á skíðum (to travel, move fast on skis), renna (to move swiftly) and skríða á skíðum (to stride on skis). In Norwegian this word is usually pronounced [ˈʂiː]. In Swedish, another language evolved from Old Norse, the word is skidor (plural, pronounced [ˈɧîːdʊr]; singular: skida). The modern Norwegian word ski and the Swedish word skid have largely retained the Old Norse meaning in words for split firewood, wood building materials (such as bargeboards) and roundpole fence.

English and French use the original Norwegian spelling ski, and modify the pronunciation. Before 1920, English often called them skee and snow-shoe. In Italian, it is pronounced similarly to Norwegian, but the spelling is modified accordingly: sci [ˈʃi]. Portuguese and Spanish adapt the word to their linguistic rules: esqui and esquí. In German, spellings Ski and Schi are in use, both pronounced [ˈʃiː]. In Dutch, the word is ski and the pronunciation was originally [ˈɕiː] as in Norwegian, but since approximately the 1960s changed to [ˈskiː]. In Welsh the word is spelled sgi. Many languages make a verb form out of the noun, such as to ski in English, skier in French, esquiar in Spanish and Portuguese, sciare in Italian, skiën in Dutch, or Schi laufen or Schi fahren (as above also Ski laufen or Ski fahren) in German. Norwegian and Swedish do not form a verb from the noun.

Finnish has its own ancient words for skis and skiing: "ski" is suksi and "skiing" is hiihtää. The word suksi goes back to the Proto-Uralic period, with cognates such as Erzya soks, Mansi tåut and Nganasan tuta. The Sami also have their own words for "skis" and "skiing": for example, the Lule Sami word for "ski" is sabek and skis are called sabega. The Sami use cognates of čuoigat (Northern Sami) for the verb "to ski".

== History ==
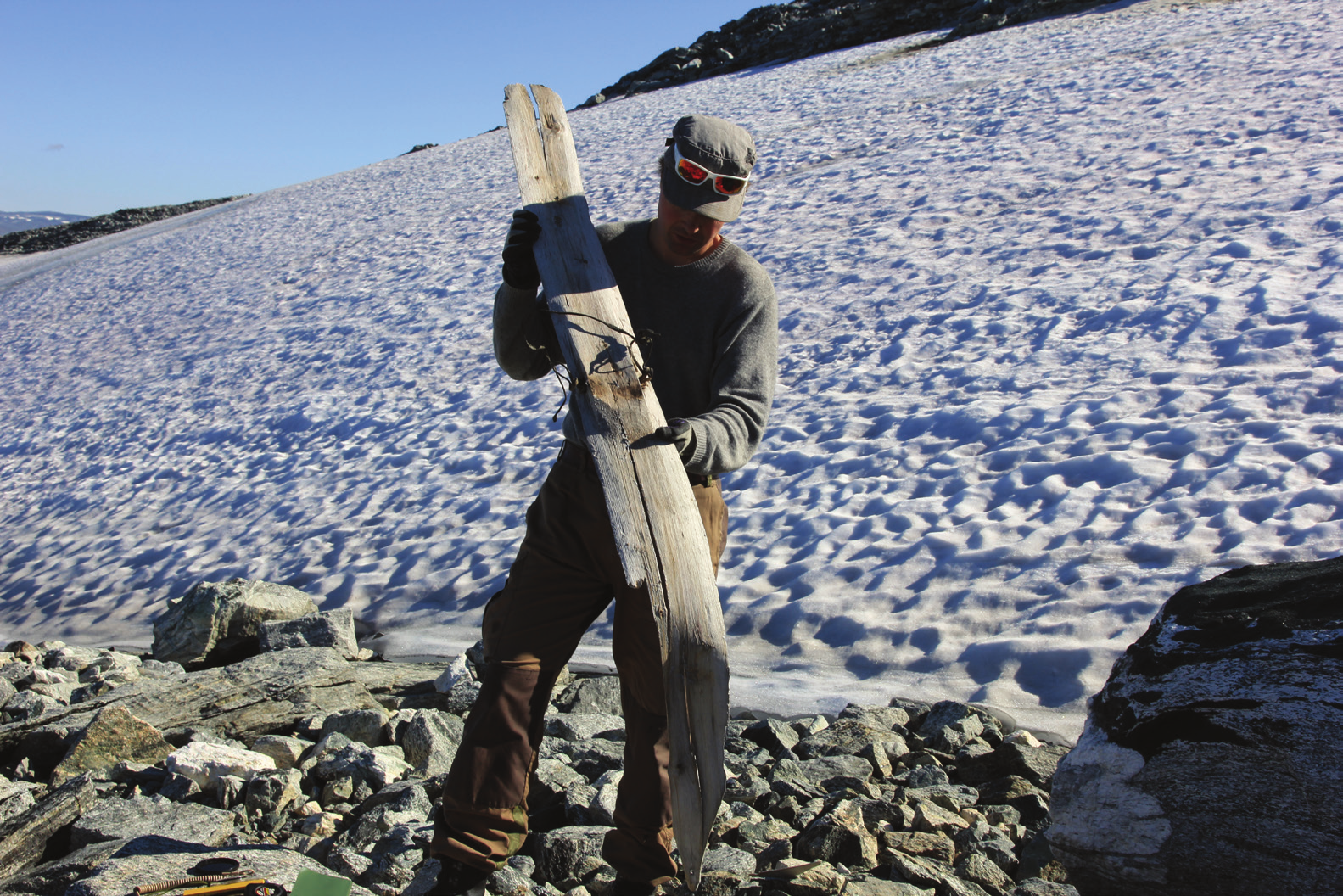
Archaeologist holding a 1,300 year-old ski where it was found preserved in ice in Norway.

Skis appeared before the wheel, with the oldest wooden skis found in Russia (c. 6300–5000 BCE), Sweden (c. 5200 BCE) and Norway (c. 3200 BCE) respectively.

These early skis were not designed for recreation or speed; their sole purpose was to keep the user on top of the snow, as when hunting or at war. Early skis were generally accompanied by a walking stick to help the user maintain balance.

Nordic ski technology was adapted during the early 20th century to enable skiers to turn at higher speeds. New ski and ski binding designs, coupled with the introduction of ski lifts to carry skiers up slopes, enabled the development of alpine skis. Meanwhile, advances in technology in the Nordic camp allowed for the development of special skis for skating and ski jumping.

=== Asymmetrical skis ===
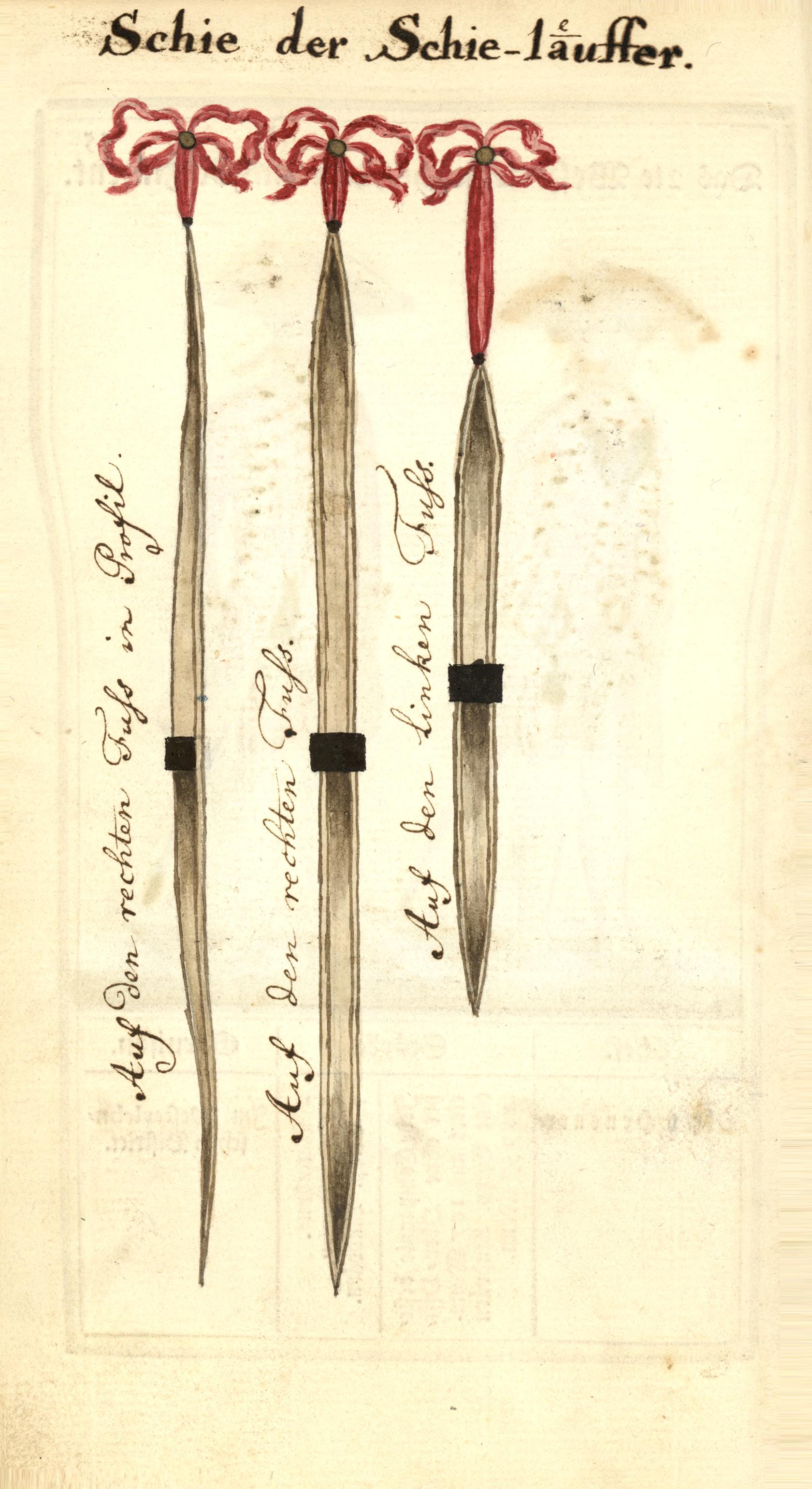
Asymmetrical skis used by the Danish-Norwegian army in the 18th century, long ski for the right leg, also shown in profile (far left).

This type of ski was used at least in northern Finland and Sweden until the 1930s. On one leg, the skier wore a long straight non-arching ski for sliding, and on the other a shorter ski for kicking. The bottom of the short ski was either plain or covered with animal skin to aid this use, while the long ski supporting the weight of the skier was treated with animal fat in similar manner to modern ski waxing. Early records of this type of skis survive in works of Olaus Magnus. He associates them with Sami people and gives Sami names of savek and golos for the plain and skinned short ski. The Finnish names for these are lyly and kalhu for the long and short ski, respectively.

=== Single long ski ===
The seal hunters at the Gulf of Bothnia had developed a special long ski to sneak into shooting distance to the seals' breathing holes, though the ski was useful in moving in the packed ice in general and was made specially long, 3–4 meters, to protect against cracks in the ice. This is called skredstång in Swedish.

=== Modern skis ===
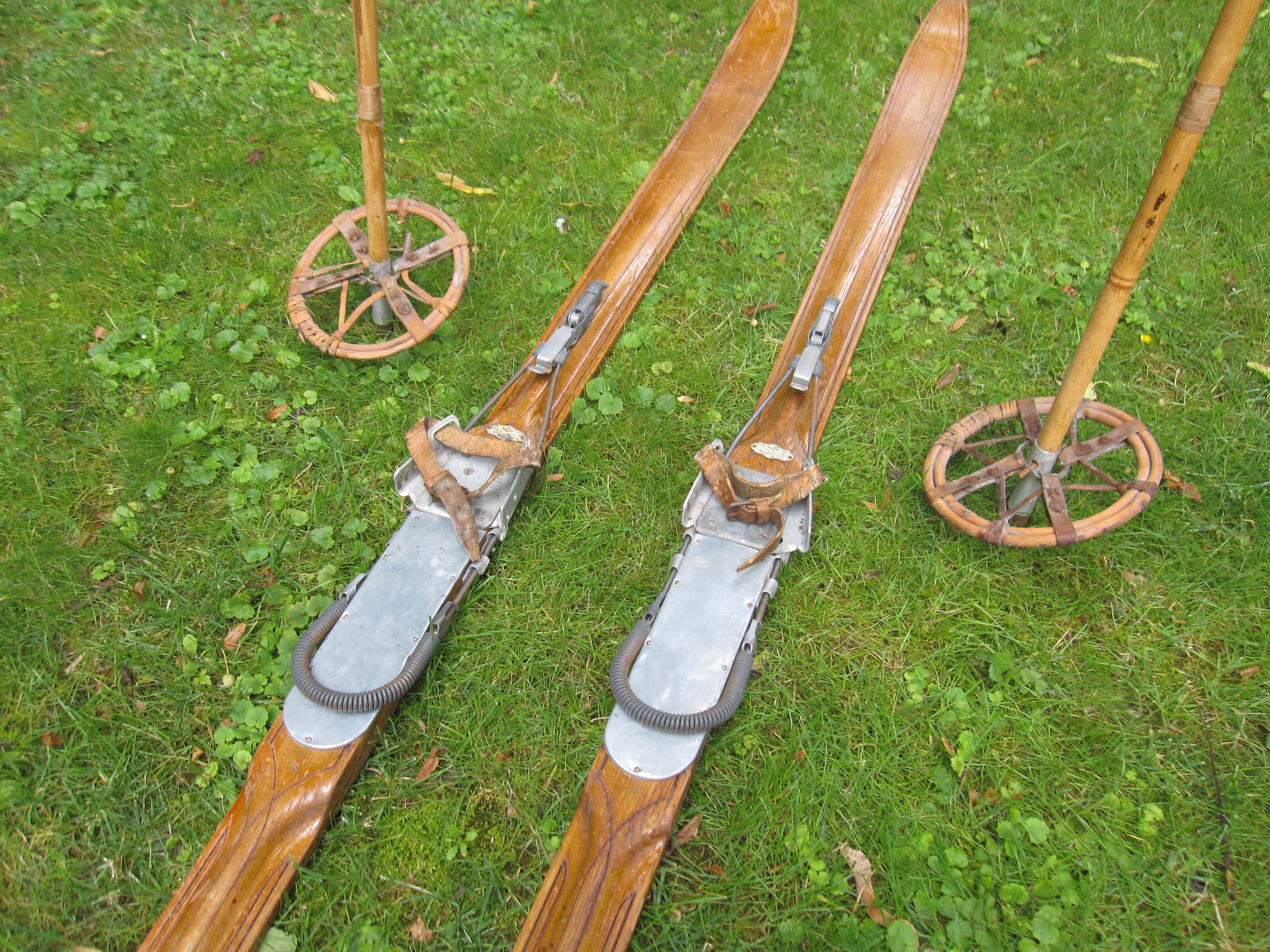
Wooden skis with cable (kandahar) bindings and bamboo poles

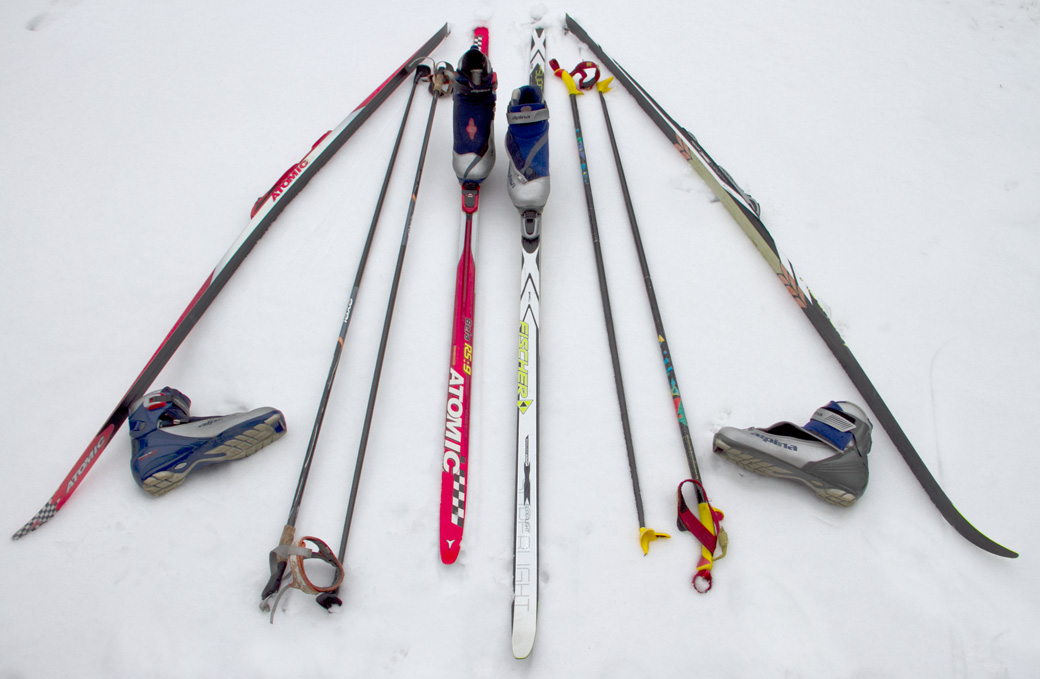
Modern cross-country skis from synthetic materials, with poles and shoes.

Around 1850, artisans in Telemark, Norway, invented the cambered ski. This ski arches up in the middle, under the binding, which distributes the skier's weight more evenly across the length of the ski. Earlier plank-style skis had to be thick enough not to bow downward and sink in the snow under the skier's weight. This new design made it possible to build a thinner lighter ski, that flexed more easily to absorb the shock of bumps, and that maneuvered and ran faster and more easily. The design also included a sidecut that narrowed the ski underfoot while the tip and tail remained wider. This enabled the ski to flex and turn more easily.

Skis traditionally were hand-carved out of a single piece of hardwood such as hickory, birch or ash. These woods were used because of their density and ability to handle speed and shock-resistance factors associated with ski racing. Because Europe's forests were dwindling, finding quality plank hardwood became difficult, which led to the invention of the laminated ski. Beginning in 1891, skimakers in Norway began laminating two or more layers of wood together to make lighter cross country running skis. These evolved into the multi-laminated high-performance skis of the mid-1930s.

A laminated ski is made of two types of wood glued together. A top layer of soft wood is glued to a thin layer under a surface of hardwood. This combination created skis which were much lighter and more maneuverable than the heavy hardwood skis made before. Although lighter and stronger, laminated skis did not wear well. The water-soluble glues used at the time failed; they warped and split along the glue edges (delaminating) frequently and rapidly. In 1922, a Norwegian skier, Thorbjorn Nordby, developed strong waterproof glue which stopped the problem of splitting, therefore developing a much tougher laminated ski. Research and design of laminated skis rapidly progressed. In 1933, a new design technology was introduced with an outer hardwood shell completely encasing an inner layer of lighter wood, successfully eliminating spontaneously splitting glue lines. This early design eventually evolved into an advanced laminating technique which is referred to today as single-shell casing technology.

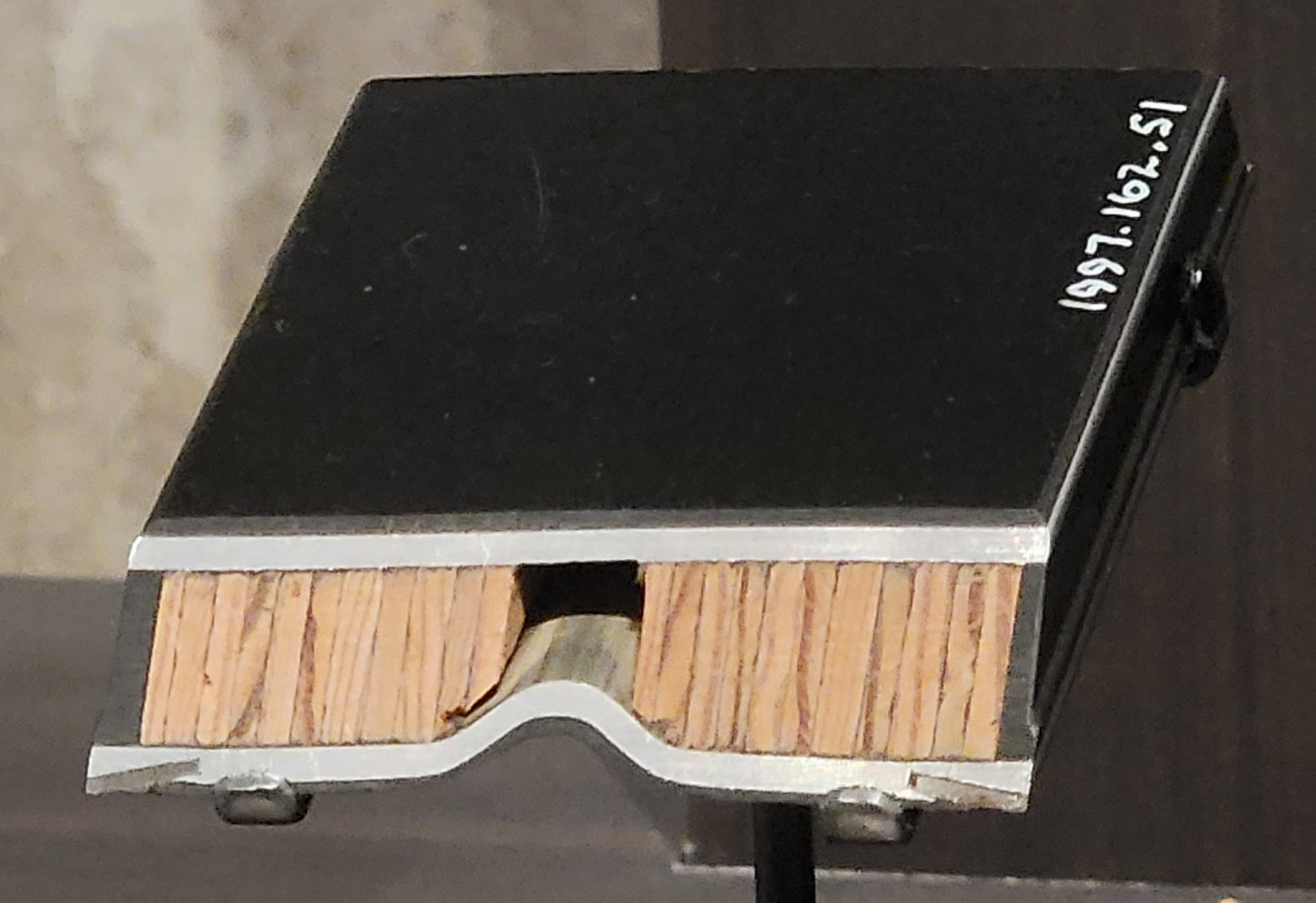
Cross-cut of Howard Head's design (ca. 1965)

In 1950, Howard Head introduced the Head Standard, constructed by sandwiching aluminium alloy around a plywood core. The design included steel edges (invented in 1928 in Austria,) and the exterior surfaces were made of phenol formaldehyde resin which could hold wax. This hugely successful ski was unique at the time, having been designed for the recreational market rather than for racing. 1962: a fibreglass ski, Kneissl's White Star, was used by Karl Schranz to win two gold medals at the FIS Alpine World Ski Championships. By the late '60s fibreglass had mostly replaced aluminum.

In 1974, Magne Myrmo became the last world champion (Falun, 15 km cross-country) using wooden skis.

In 1975, the torsion box ski construction design is patented. The patent is referenced by Kästle, Salomon, Rottefella, and Madshus. In 1993 Elan introduced the Elan SCX model, skis with a much wider tip and tail than waist. When tipped onto their edges, they bend into a curved shape and carve a turn. Cross-country techniques use different styles of turns; edging is not as important, and cross-country skis have little sidecut. For many years, alpine skis were shaped similarly to cross-country, simply shorter and wider, but the Elan SCX introduced a radial sidecut design that dramatically improved performance. Other companies quickly followed suit, one Austrian ski designer admitting, "It turns out that everything we thought we knew for forty years was wrong." Line Skis, the first free-ski focused ski company inspired the newschool freeskiing movement with its twin-tip ski boards in 1995. The first company to successfully market and mass-produce a twin-tip ski to ski switch (skiing backwards) was the Salomon Group, with its 1080 ski in 1998.

== Geometry ==
Described in the direction of travel, the front of the ski, typically pointed or rounded, is the tip, the middle is the waist and the rear is the tail. Skis have four aspects that define their basic performance: length, width, sidecut and camber. Skis also differ in more minor ways to address certain niche roles. For instance, mogul skis are softer to absorb shocks, powder skis are wider to provide more float and rocker skis bent upwards (reverse camber) at the tip and tail to make it easier to turn in deep and heavy snow.

== Construction ==
Skis have evolved from being made of solid wood to using a variety of materials including carbon-Kevlar to make skis stronger, stiffer in twisting, lighter, and more durable. Ski manufacturing techniques allow skis to be made in one or a combination of three designs:

=== Laminate or sandwich ===
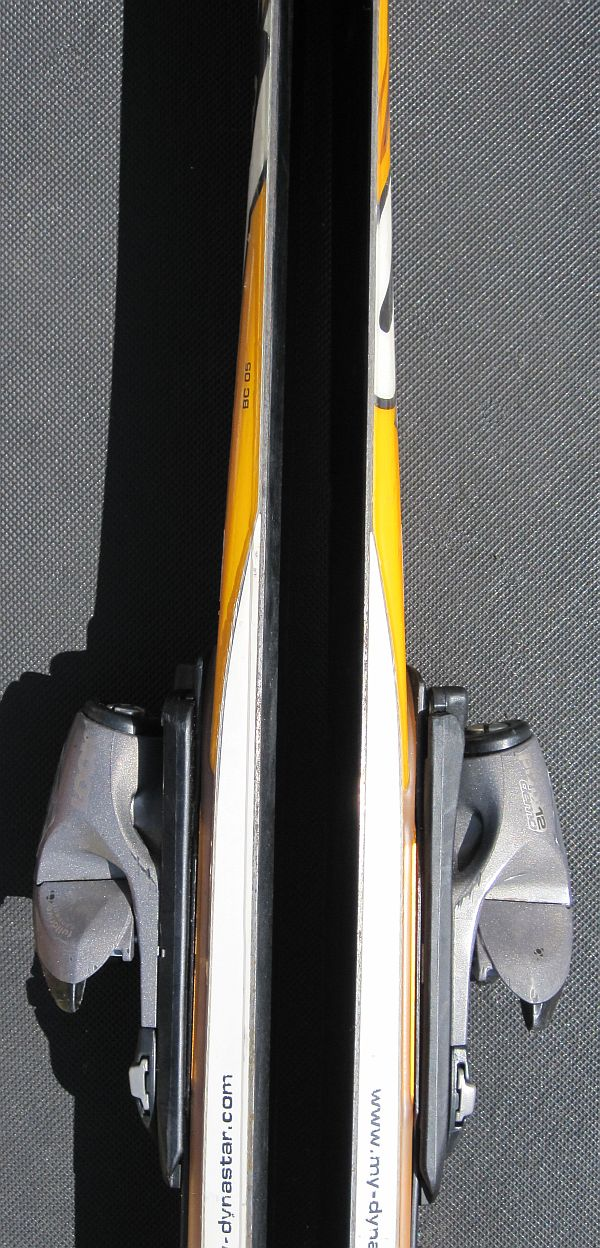
Combination of cap design (upper part) and sidewall laminated design (lower part, white)

Laminated skis are built in layers. Materials such as fiberglass, steel, aluminum alloy, or plastic are layered and compressed above and below the core. Laminated construction is the most widely used manufacturing process in the ski industry today. The first successful laminate ski, and arguably the first modern ski was the Head Standard, introduced in 1950, which sandwiched aluminum alloy around a plywood core.

=== Torsion box ===
The Dynamic VR7 introduced a new construction method in which a smaller wooden core was wrapped in wet fibreglass, as opposed to pre-dried sheets of fibreglass being glued to the core (essentially replacing metal sheets). The result was a torsion box, which made the ski much stronger. The VR7, and its more famous follow-on VR17, was the first fibreglass ski that could be used for men's racing, and quickly took over that market. Over time, materials for both the core and torsion box have changed, with wood, various plastic foams, fibreglass, kevlar and carbon fiber all being used in different designs. Torsion box designs continue to dominate cross-country ski designs, but is less common for alpine and ski touring.

=== Monocoque or cap ===
During the 1980s, Bucky Kashiwa developed a new construction technique using a rolled stainless steel sheet forming three sides of a torsion box over a wooden core, with the base of the ski forming the bottom. Introduced in 1989, the Volant skis proved expensive to produce, and in spite of numerous positive reviews, the company never became profitable. In 1990, the Salomon S9000 took the same basic concept but replaced the steel with plastics, producing a design they called "monocoque". Now referred to as the "cap ski" design, the concept eliminates the need to wrap the core and replaces this with a single-step process that is much less expensive to produce. Cap ski construction dominates alpine ski construction today.

=== Historical ===
The classical wooden ski consists of a single long piece of suitable wood that is hand-carved to the required shape. Early designs were generally rectangular in cross-section, with the tip bent up through application of steam. Over time the designs changed, and skis were thinned out to the sides, or had prominent ridges down the center.

=== Notable manufacturers ===
- K2 is a major US-based ski manufacturing company. In 1961 they were one of the first companies to begin producing and distributing fiberglass skis. Today K2 is primarily renowned for its wide variety of torsion-box ski designs. They sponsor several professional skiers and ski teams.
- Rossignol is a French company established in 1907. Rossignol introduced its first fiberglass ski in 1964. Today the company offers a wide range of ski designs and produces over 500,000 pairs of skis per year. Rossignol also manufactures boots, bindings, and poles.
- Elan is a Slovenian company, located in Begunje, notable in ski manufacturing for inventing shaped skis, also called parabolic skis, which made carve turns possible at low speeds and with short turn radius.

== Types ==
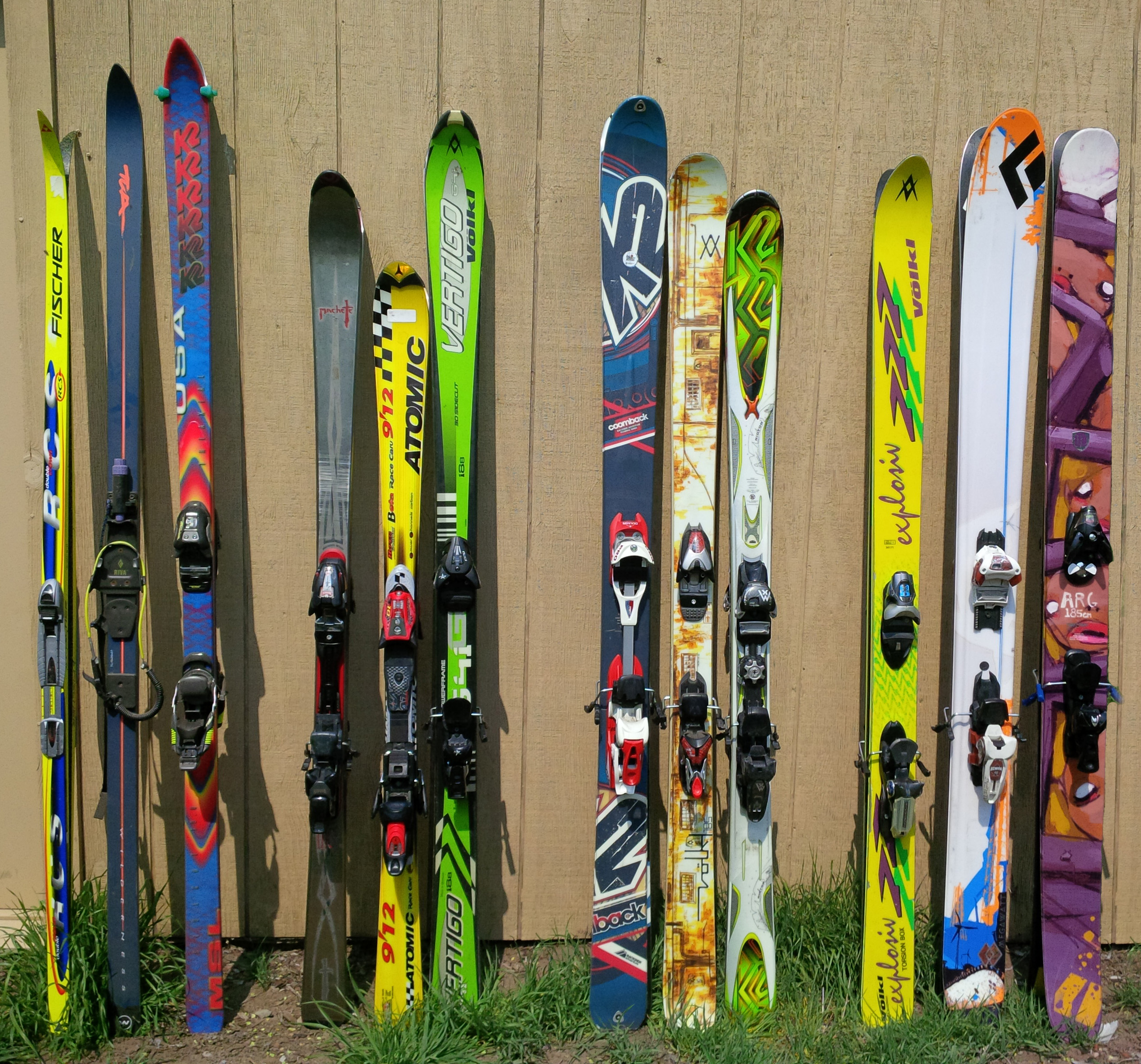
Four groups of different ski types, from left to right: 1. Non-sidecut: cross-country, telemark and mountaineering; 2. Parabolic; 3. Twin-tip; 4. Powder

In the history of skiing many types of skis have been developed, designed for different needs, of which the following is a selection.

=== Alpine ===
Alpine skis, also called downhill skis, are skis designed specifically for lift-assisted resort runs. Ski design has evolved enormously since the beginnings of the modern sport in mid-19th-century Norway. Modern skis typically have steel edges, camber, side cut, and possibly reverse camber. During the 1990s side cut became more pronounced to make it easier to carve turns. Alpine skis typically have fixed-heel bindings. Specialised types of alpine skis exist for certain uses, including twin-tip skis for freestyle skiing, slalom skis, GS skis, powder skis, telemark skis and monoskis.

The following table shows different kinds of alpine ski types and their uses within a downhill skiing context.

Type	Design	Description
Twin-tip		Alpine ski designed for recreational skiing. The ski has a wide and similarly wide and tilted up tail, which allows landings where the skier is facing backwards, making it suitable for a terrain park, or attempting features such as boxes, rails, or jumps.
Slalom		Alpine ski designed for racing slalom with a narrow midsection, compared with the tip and tail, allowing the short turn radius necessary where gates are close to one another.
GS		Alpine ski designed for racing giant slalom with a narrow midsection, compared with the tip and tail, allowing the turn radius necessary where gates are spaced further apart than in slalom. These skis are commensurately longer and wider in the midsection than slalom skis.
Powder		Alpine ski designed for recreational use with a wide waist area that allows for higher buoyancy on low-density powder snow by reducing ski pressure on the snow surface.
Telemark		Telemark skis are generally used for telemark skiing, which is described as a mix of alpine, ski-jump, and cross country skiing forms. The skis themselves are similar to regular skis, although they are typically made lighter for mobility. The main difference is in the binding rather than the ski itself, where the toe of the boot is attached to the ski, with the heel being free to move.
Monoski		The monoski is a type of ski designed with the idea of a pair of skis turned into a single piece. The board is designed to have two boots kept side by side, with the skier facing forward down the mountain. The board itself is very similar in design to a snowboard, with the idea of two feet on the same part. Although in comparison the monoski has a wider turnt up tip and is far heavier than a snowboard, with bindings much more similar to that of skis.

=== Backcountry ===
Backcountry skiing, also known as off-piste skiing, is any form of skiing done outside of ski area boundaries. Most of the time this type of skiing is done with alpine touring skis, or telemark gear, where skiers take advantage of climbing skins and a detachable heel, to ski uphill. When the skier reaches the top of the area they want to ski down, they take off the climbing skins and make the necessary preparations to ski back down. Backcountry terrain can also be accessed with standard alpine equipment by riding a lift uphill at a ski resort and then leaving the resort boundary. However, this is more commonly known as sidecountry because of its immediate access from a ski lift.

=== Nordic ===
In Nordic skiing the skier is not reliant on ski lifts to get up hills, and so skis and boots tend to be lighter, with a free heel to facilitate walking. Styles of Nordic skiing equipment include:

- Cross-country skis are light and narrow, with a slight sidecut. Three binding systems are popular: Rottefella's NNN, Salomon's SNS profil, and SNS pilot. Ski bases are waxed to reduce friction during forward motion, and kick wax can also be applied for grip. Some waxless models have patterns on the bottom to avoid the necessity of grip waxing for classic technique.
- Skating skis are shorter than classic skis and do not need grip wax. The skating technique is used in biathlons.
- Ski jumping skis are long and wide.
- Roller skis have wheels for use on dry pavement, in the absence of snow.

== Poles ==
Ski poles are commonly used in tandem with skis in a variety of types of skiing. They typically give additional maneuverability and support turning, walking, and getting up after falling.

== Ski maintenance ==
Ski maintenance encompasses four facets: binding adjustments, waxing, edge shaping, and base repair.

Binding adjustment: Safety-release ski bindings require adjustment to fit the weight and height of the skier. Annual maintenance assures that settings continue to be correct. For rental skis, such an adjustment is required for each change of customers.

Waxing: Most ski wax minimizes gliding friction on snow. "Grip wax" promotes grip on snow for cross-country skis. Wax may be applied in three ways, melting on, rubbing on and as a paste.

- Hot wax is applied with heat by ironing the melted wax on the ski base and allowing it to penetrate the pore structure, it is then scraped off and burnished.
- Hard wax may be rubbed on and smoothed, mechanically from a bar or canister of the material. This technique is the rule for grip waxes.
- Paste wax allows reducing friction with a rapid adjustment to snow conditions at the expense of durability.

Edge shaping: Edges engage the snow, especially during icy conditions. The angle from the plane of the bottom of the ski is set, depending on the type of skiing anticipated, as follows:

- Slalom skiers: 0° to 0.5°
- Intermediate skiers and giant-slalom skiers: 0.5° to 1°
- Beginners and down-hill racers: 2°

Edge shaping may be done daily with carborundum or diamond stone to remove imperfections. Tuning the edges requires a series of applications of sharpening tools and stones, working at approximately right angles along the metal edge.

Base repair: Ski base repair has three levels: cleaning, filling imperfections, and surface preparation.

- Cleaning promotes the removal of dirt and wax, allowing repair material to bond to the ski.
- Repair of gouges may be accomplished with a drip-candle of paraffin and polyethylene blend or a harder, more durable stick of pure polyethylene. Both are melted into the imperfections and then scraped even with the surface of the ski.
- Surface preparation involves blending of repairs into the base and then texturing to befit the snow conditions with a gritty material, using successively finer grits, depending on the snow temperature. Other treatments include "rilling" installing miniature grooves along the ski or a steel brush.

== See also ==
- List of ski brands
- Noboard
- Monoski
- Skwal
- Snowboard
- Snurfer
- Splitboard
- Teleboard
- Water ski
