= Elan SCX =

Alpine ski design

SCX
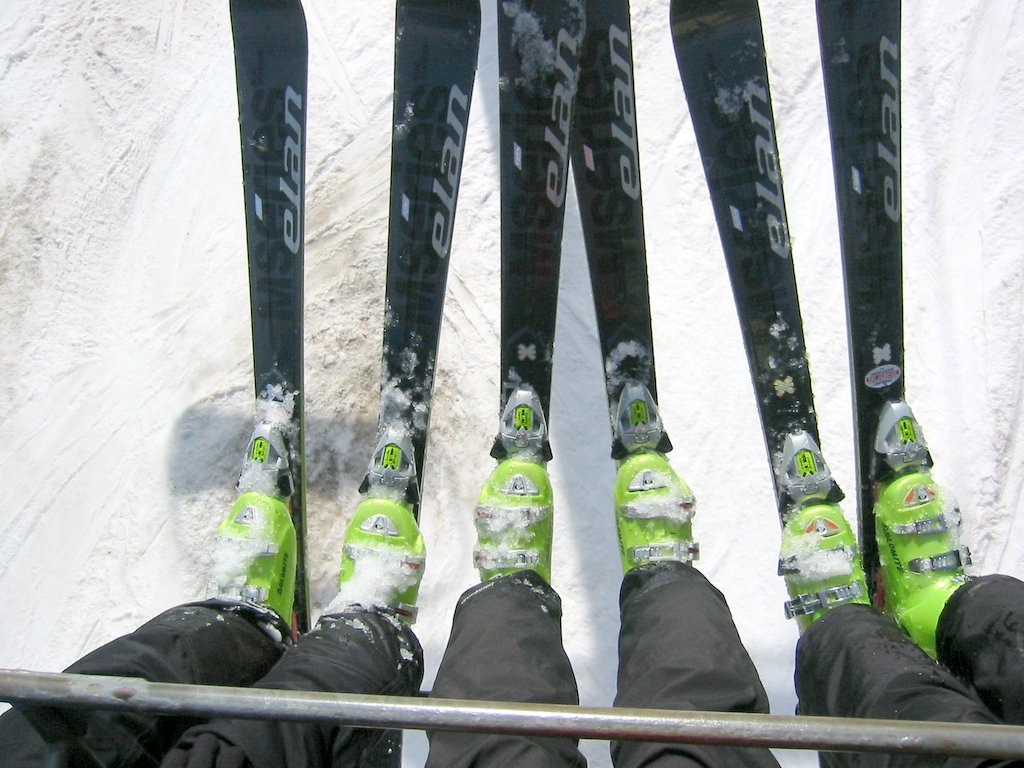
- Elan skis derived from the SCX design
- Inventor: Jurij Franko and Pavel Škofic
- Inception: 1993/4
- Manufacturer: Elan

The SCX, for "SideCut eXtreme" (or "eXperiment"), was an alpine ski introduced by Elan in the winter of 1993/4. Skis before the SCX had almost always used a shape that was slightly curved inward on the sides, typically by 7 millimetres (0.28 in) compared to a straight line running from tip to tail. The SCX was designed with over 22 millimetres (0.87 in) "sidecut", producing a wasp-waisted ski unlike anything on the market.

The SCX proved to dramatically improve turn performance and made it much easier to perform the efficient carve turn. This led to higher speeds in giant slalom, and the ski started winning race after race when it was introduced. It also made skiing easier in general, and revolutionized ski schools, especially in the US where the design first caught on. By 1996 every major ski company was racing to introduce similar designs, and traditional designs were being sold off for pennies on the dollar.

As the first successful "shaped" or "parabolic" ski, the SCX is considered one of the most important advances in the history of the sport.

== Early ski designs ==
The first true downhill skis, made in Telemark, Norway by Sondre Norheim, were handmade from single pieces of hardwood and featured a relatively modest sidecut of about 4 to 5 mm. Alpine ski development after this seminal introduction proceeded in a series of stepwise improvements; laminate woods, metal edges, metal laminates (see the article on the Head Standard) and finally the fibreglass torsion box design were introduced over a period of 100 years. Throughout, little engineering effort had been spent on considering the ski shape, as other issues like torsional stiffness and "chattering" were problems that needed to be solved. Skis of the 1970s were largely identical in shape to those of the 1800s.

Skis with narrower waist profiles had been experimented with, but had never become widely used. In 1939, Dick Durrance ordered a custom ski from Thor Groswold's factory in Denver with a 7 mm sidecut, and this became a new standard for slalom skis. During the winter of 1948/49, Jerry Hiatt and Thor's son Jerry decided to experiment with even bigger sidecuts. Taking a pair of the company's standard hickory Rocket skis, they cut away wood until they produced a 15 millimetres (0.59 in) sidecut. When they tried them out, they found they turned quite easily in a series of rounded turns. Ironically, this was considered poor form in the era of the stem Christie, where good form was a series of sharp J-shaped turns. The two abandoned the design, speculating that they ended up as firewood.

In any event, wooden skis of this era did not offer much torsional stiffness; when rolled on-edge by the skier's boots, the tips and tails of the ski would tend to twist in the opposite direction in order to lie flatter on the snow, reducing the sidecut's performance improvement. Hiatt and Groswold's experiment required such a deep sidecut that the waist had little vertical stiffness, another problem for the design.

== Snowboards arrive ==
A radical change in design did not occur until the mid-1970s introduction of the first modern snowboards. With no previous designs to set the mould, snowboard designers had to experiment to find the right layout. The 1975 Burton Backhill had a 17 millimetres (0.67 in) sidecut, giving the board a very short turning radius. The Backhill was extremely low-tech in comparison to contemporary ski designs, consisting largely of a sheet of plywood. A contemporary ski's torsion box design greatly improved torsional stiffness and would allow even greater sidecut to be effective. But in spite of the snowboard demonstrating that modern skis could carry much wider sidecuts, and that such a sidecut resulted in excellent turn performance, little came of this development. The snowboard market was ignored by the major ski companies through the 1970s and 80s.

Experiments with slightly greater sidecut on skis did appear during this period, including the Head Yahoo and especially the Atomic Powder Plus. Further developments followed due to changes in competitive giant slalom, as the gates were moved further apart and resulted in much more turning. K2 responded with the GS Race with a 10 millimetres (0.39 in) sidecut, and several similar designs followed. Despite reports that these skis were easier to turn, they were considered specialty items and the designs offered only to the race and performance markets.

One particularly notable experiment was made at Olin. In 1984, one of the Olin executives asked ski designer Frank Meatto if it were possible to make a beginners ski that would make skiing easier to learn. Meatto and co-designer Ed Pilpel decided to experiment with a radical sidecut as a way of improving turns. They designed a ski with a 31 millimetres (1.2 in) sidecut, but it had tips that were 128 millimetres (5.0 in) wide and they wouldn't fit into their presses. They solved this by cutting the ski in half longitudinally, leaving the curve only on the inside edge, which powers the turn. The ski was so narrow underfoot that additional platforms had to be added to mount the bindings. The result was effectively one-half of the parabolic designs that would follow. The company produced 150 pairs to demonstrate at the SIA trade show in 1986, but no one purchased the odd-looking asymmetrical "Albert" design.

== Franko and Škofic ==
Jurij Franko (Note: Jurij Franko has sometimes been confused with skier Jure Franko, who attended the same primary school in the 1970s and came second in giant slalom at the Sarajevo Olympics.) graduated from the University of Ljubljana in 1983 with a degree in engineering and in 1985 and took a position at Elan in 1987. In 1988 Franko took up the idea of experimenting with deeper sidecuts and started the "Sidecut Extreme" project to test it. He was joined by Pavel Škofic, who calculated the stress loading on a ski with a wasp-waisted layout. Previous ski designs had so little sidecut that they could be treated with calculations based on a constant width.

Their first prototype was 193 centimetres (76 in) long and has been lost. The second one was 203 centimetres (80 in) long, a typical length for men's skis in this era, and is still skiable. By 1991 these experiments had clearly suggested a new design that was 110 millimetres (4.3 in) wide at the tip, 63 millimetres (2.5 in) in the waist, and 105 millimetres (4.1 in) at the tail. This produced a sidecut of 22.25 millimetres (0.876 in), three times the conventional 7 mm sidecut of the average race ski, and over double that of even the most radical designs in use.

The ski was so prone to turning that racers did not have to angle their legs as much in order to generate the same turn, allowing them to stand more upright with less bend in the knee, and thereby apply much more force to the edges. The new design was an immediate hit on the local race market; in its first outing with the ski, the Elan team took the top eight of ten places.

== SCX emerges ==
In 1991, Elan used their research examples to produce a new commercial ski, the SCX. The company sold it across Europe, but found it difficult to break into a market dominated by the large players, Salomon and Rossignol.

In the spring of 1993, a number of pre-production SCX skis were sent to instructors in the US for practical experimentation. They invariably reported dramatic results, with intermediate skiers able to produce carving turns easily, even in poor conditions that experts would normally find difficult. Realizing they had a winning design, the Elan team started designing a series aimed at the training market, including a 163 cm long design for the instructors, and a 143 cm long version for students and junior racers. This was much shorter than most skis of the era, further differentiating them from other skis on the market. These were being demonstrated across Europe and the US during December 1993.

The change in length was not accidental. With most of the mass distributed at the ends of the skis, the rotational inertia was considerably higher and the skis were difficult to rotate under the foot. Additionally, as was discovered by Groswold and Hiatt half a century earlier, with so much force being applied at the end of the skis, they had to be much stronger under the waist. The solution was simply to make the ski considerably shorter, reducing the moment arm and counteracting these effects. Skis quickly evolved to shorter lengths; 190 to 210 cm were typical lengths for men's skis prior to the parabolics, and generally 160 to 170 cm after.

Other companies were aware of the SCX, and several had already been working on a radical sidecut designs of their own. In particular, Atomic had been developing a similar concept known as the S-Ski, and had shown it at US trade shows during the winter of 1993. However, the market was already in the midst of a major change to the "cap ski" construction method, sparked off by the Salomon S9000 in 1990. All of the major manufacturers were introducing cap ski designs of their own, and had little interest in another radical change at the same time. This was not the only problem; the ideal design featured tips and tails that wouldn't fit in conventional presses, and the presses that were wide enough were busy producing snowboards. The concept was not only ignored, but actively dismissed as a fad or gimmick.

Elan, however, had introduced a cap ski of their own shortly after the S9000. They built the SCX on these lines, thereby combining all of the latest features in a single ski. This left Elan in the undisputed lead introducing the new shape. When describing the turns the SCX produced, Franko used the term "parabolic". The term immediately caught on, and became so popular that every ski like it was soon called "a parabolic". Every mention of the term led back to the SCX, providing excellent visibility for the company. When it hit the stores during the winter of 1993, it was named "ski of the year" in the trade press.

== Parabolic revolution ==
By 1994 a number of smaller companies had introduced parabolic skis of their own, including the Atomic S-Ski and similar Kneissl Ergo (which developed from Olin's earlier models). Fischer joined the fray with the 15 mm sidecut Ice and there was a similar model from Head, the Cyber 24. The large conglomerates, Salomon, Rossignol and K2, continued to ignore it.

K2 was the first among the major manufacturers to follow Elan's lead. In 1994 they designed a prototype with a 98 mm tip that would fit into their 100 mm presses. They planned on producing a range of skis based on this design, the Four, Three and Two. The Four was a race ski, and as is typical in the industry, was the first to be produced. When Bode Miller started winning races on the K2 Four in the 1996 Junior Championships, the other large companies took note. Yet the European companies continued to view it as a curiosity, an American fad. But when racers started buying them over any other design, these companies started frantic efforts to produce similar designs. In 1996, Salomon introduced the Axendo and Rossignol the Cut, their first shaped designs.

For the 1995/6 season, the new designs accounted for only 3% of total sales. By the next year, with all the major players involved, they accounted for 50%. By 1997 every manufacturer had a variety of skis with differing sidecuts, and older designs were derisively dismissed as "skinny skis". These older designs clogged the discount racks, and top-of-the-line models from the previous year could now be purchased for $29.95. It became clear that skis should have always been shaped this way, and one designer later noted that "It turned out that everything we thought we knew for forty years was wrong."

By the 1997/98 season every ski company was producing only parabolic designs. Despite fire-sale prices on older designs, parabolics accounted for 70% of all ski sales by 1999. Over time they came to be known as carving skis, super-sidecuts, hourglass skis, and finally shaped skis.
