= Twin-tip ski =

Skiing equipment

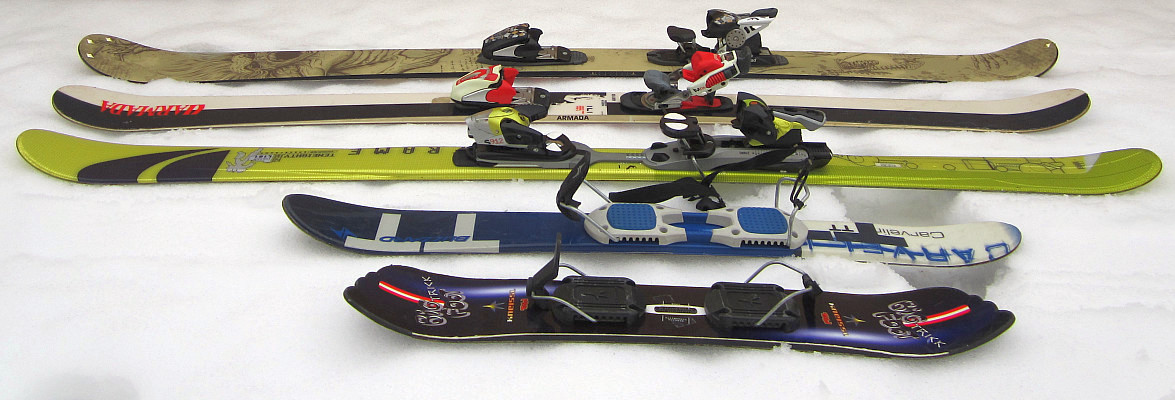
Twintip skis (back to front: backcountry ski, park ski with wood core, park ski with foam core, skiboards

A modified version of their alpine counterparts, twin-tip skis are designed to enable a skier to take off and land backward while jumping and to ski backwards (switch) down a slope. The name "twin-tip" comes from the dual shape of the ski. While most alpine skis have a defined, curved-up front end (or "tip") as well as a flat rear end (or "tail"), twin-tip skis have a curved-up tip and tail.

Initially designed for terrain park and halfpipe skiing, the twin tip design has become common in the ski industry. Some modern twin-tip skis have been designed to be highly flexible and durable, specifically for disciplines like urban skiing and swerve skiing. They have rapidly gained popularity on other parts of the mountain as well. Powder skis, all-mountain skis, and even telemark skis are all available with twin tips.

== History ==
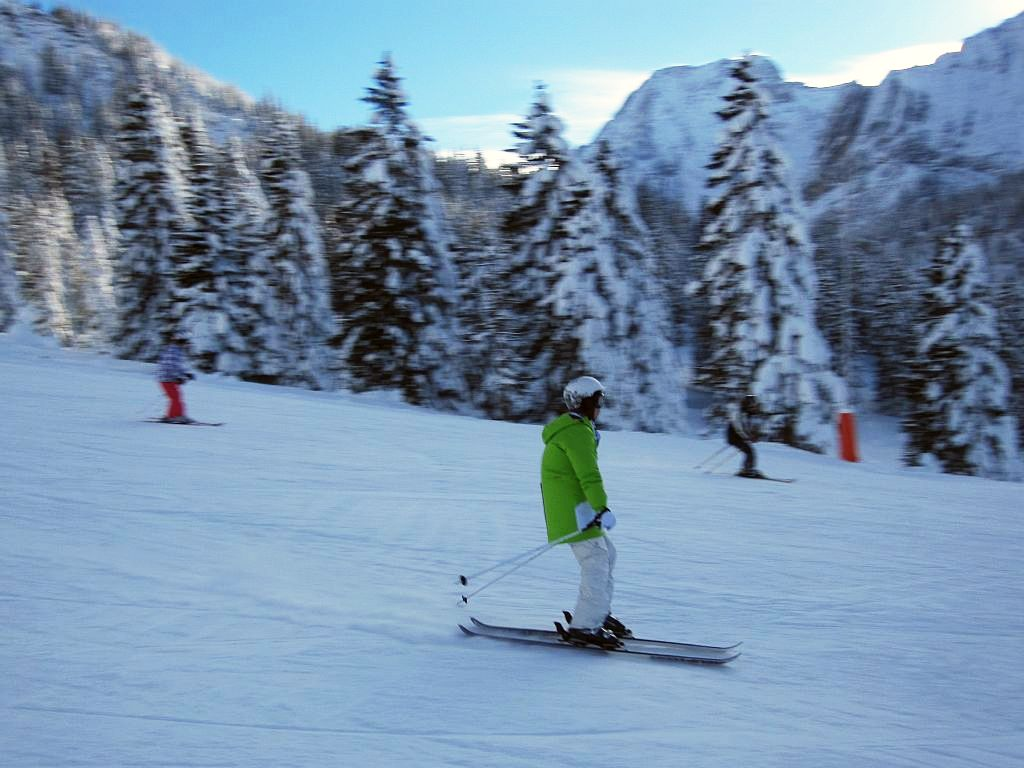
Skier on twin-tip skis

Early photographic evidence, of a purpose built twin tip ski, is discernible in director Arnold Fanck’s 1931 film The White Ecstasy. In a comedic scene, while wearing twin tip skis, actor Walter Riml plays a novice skier inadvertently performing a series of 360s on snow, all the while reading a book on how to ski.

The first mass produced twin-tip ski (modest rise in the tail) was the Olin Mark IV Comp introduced in 1974. The first company to successfully market a twin-tip ski to ski switch and "Air Carve" was the Salomon Group, with their 1080 ski in 1998. LINE skis also evolved from twin tip ski boards and inspired the newschool freeskiing movement and ultimately helped give rise to independent ski companies Armada, 4FRNT, and Ninthward, all of which specialized in the design of twin-tip skis.
