= Ski skins =

Removable pieces of fabric that enable skis to move uphill

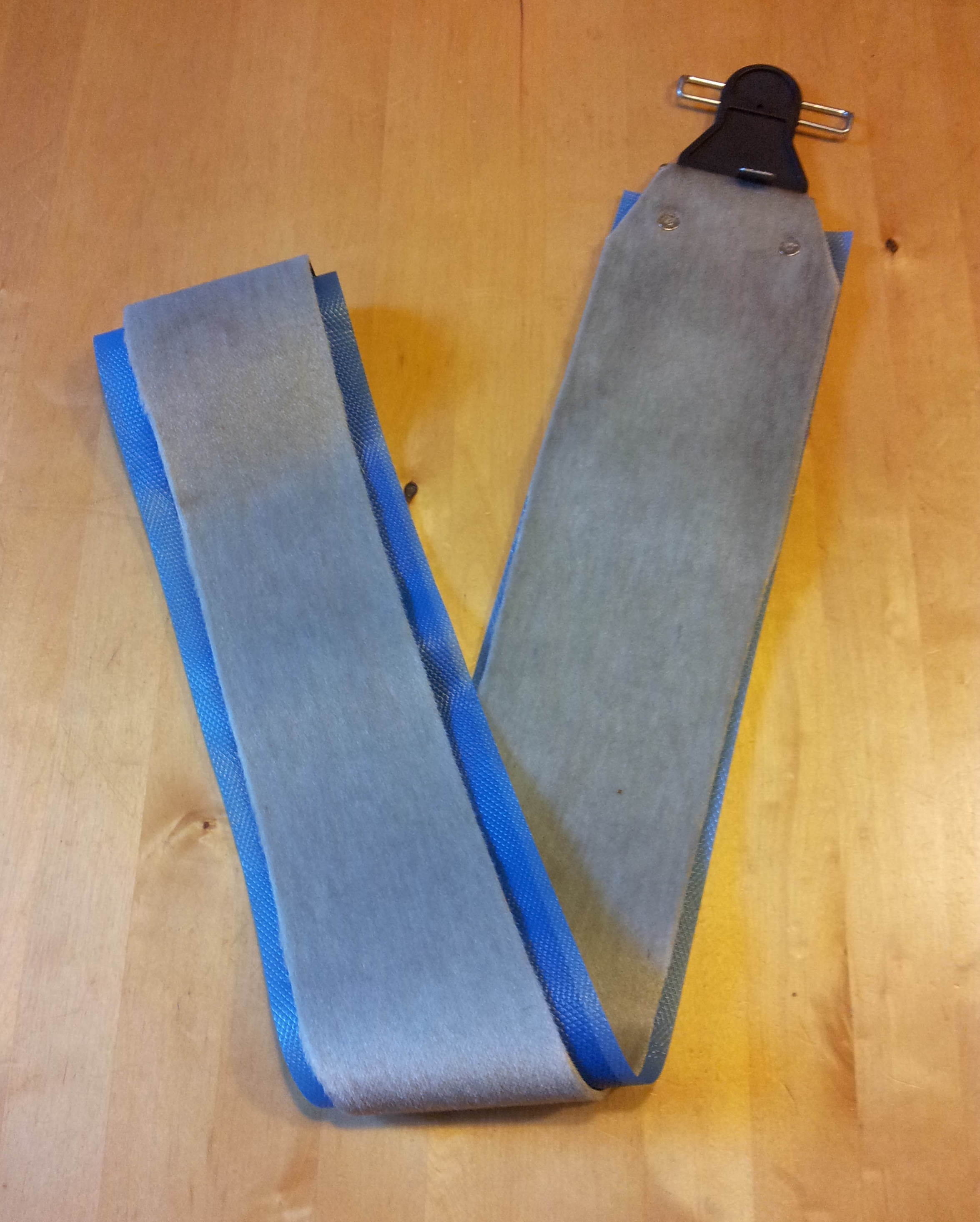
Climbing skin

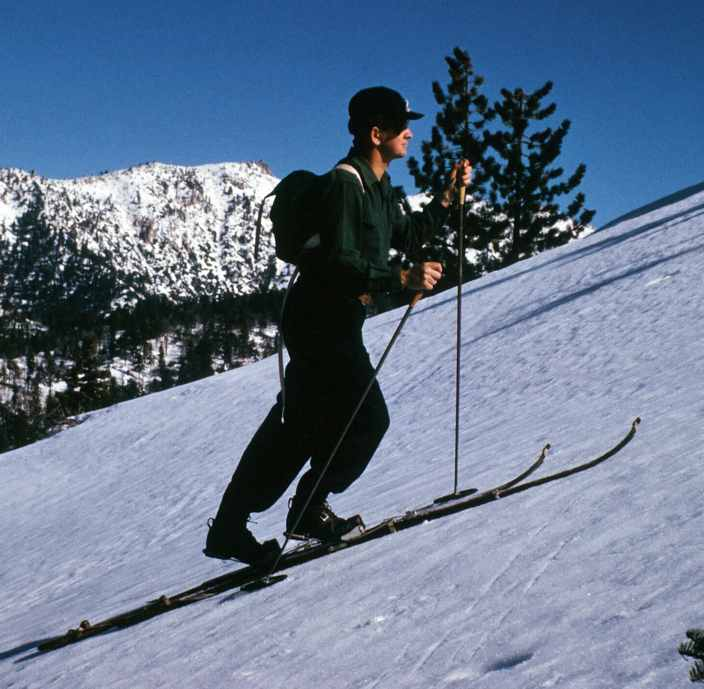
Ascent with skins, John Surr en route to Slide Peak, California

Climbing skins are strips that attach to the bottom of Nordic, alpine touring or randonnée skis to help while ascending backcountry slopes. They are designed to be removed for skiing downhill. They are typically attached to the skis via a loop on the ski tip, a hook on the tail, and adhesive on the base of the skin. They are called skins because they resemble sealskin, from which the first ski skins were made. They are typically made from nylon or mohair or a combination thereof, and are designed to let the ski slide forward on snow but not backward. They are usually narrower than the ski to allow the ski edges to get a grip. Some ski resorts permit skinning.

== History ==
Various ethnic groups living in the Arctic regions created a means of transportation across the ice and snow surfaces of their regions, with innovations such as the ski. Attuned to maximizing the use of their materials, one outcome of their innovation was the use of animal skins to gain traction in traveling. As these groups were nomadic, the technology of skis for transportation was integral to continual movement across the region, as well as in maximizing transportation speed while reducing energy expenditure.

== Materials ==
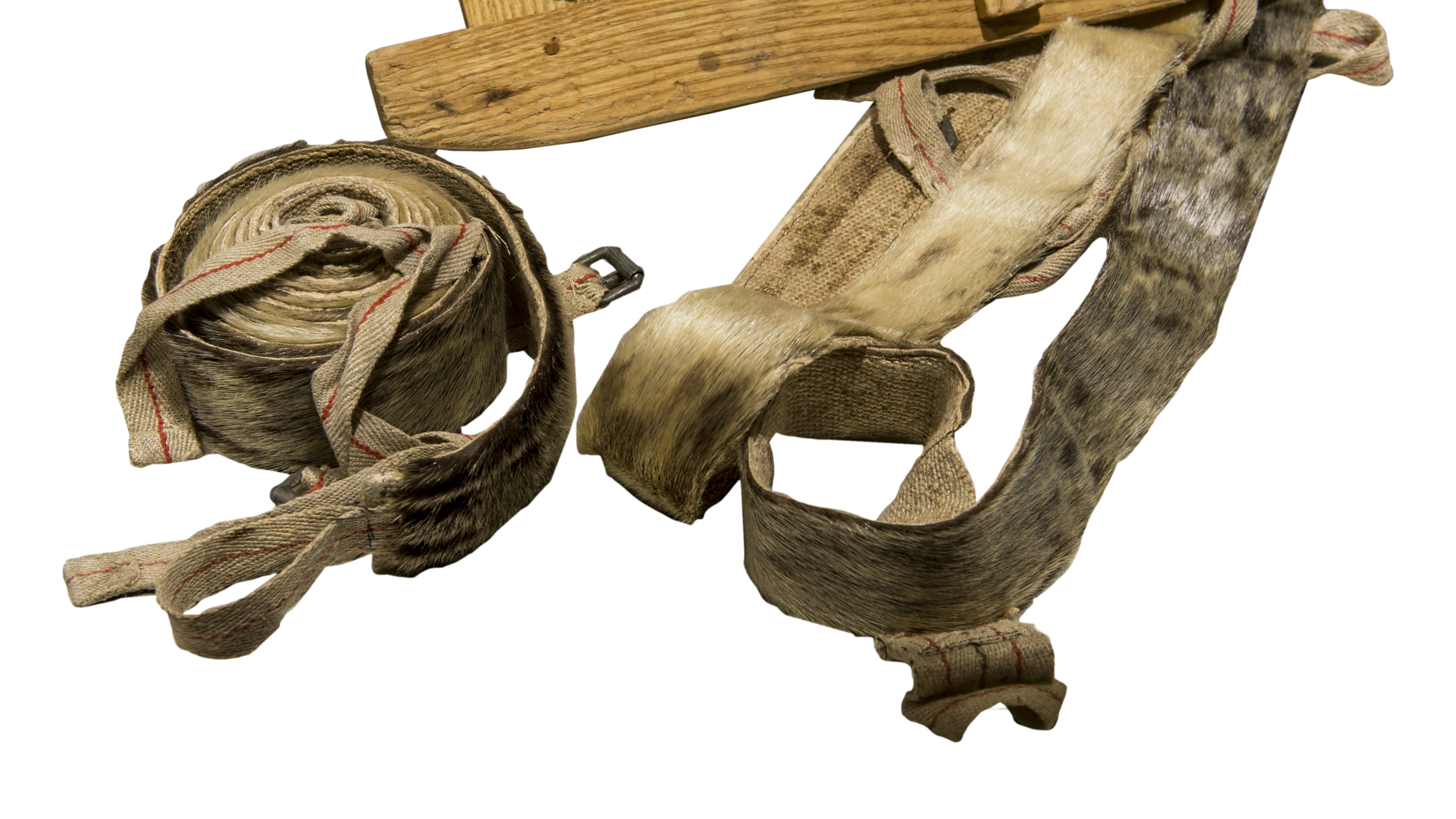
Traditional skins made from sealskin

Common materials for manufacturing skins are mohair and nylon. Mohair normally glides better on the forward movement, but provides less grip compared to nylon skins. Mohair skins also tend to pack lighter and easier. Nylon on the other hand has increased durability, especially when used in harsher, icier snow conditions, or on rocks. Depending on regional snow conditions, skiers will tend to prefer one or the other. As a rule of thumb, if snow in the region is softer and more powdery, mohair is preferred. In regions where icy conditions are more likely, nylon is normally the preferred choice. Some companies sell mixed skins using mohair and nylon fibers on the same skin.

== See also ==
- Ski touring
