= Elan (company) =

Slovenian sporting goods company

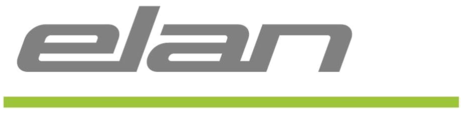
- Type: Public
- Industry: Sports equipment
- Founded: September 24, 1945; 81 years ago
- Founder: Rudi Finžgar
- Headquarters: Begunje na Gorenjskem, Slovenia
- Area served: Worldwide
- Key people: Jeffrey Tirman (Chairman and CEO)
- Products: Skis, Yachts
- Revenue: ▲€95 million (2019)
- Number of employees: 800
- Website: elan.si

Elan is a sporting goods manufacturer in Begunje na Gorenjskem, Slovenia. It is best known for its skis and snowboards. Other products include sailboats from 30 to 50 ft (9 to 15 m) length, motor yachts, apparel (mostly sportswear), and equipment for sports facilities. The brand became better known in the late 1970s, when Swedish alpine skiing ace Ingemar Stenmark won three consecutive World Cup overall titles on Elan skis.

== History ==
The company originated from a Slovene Partisan workshop that operated during the Second World War, when skis were produced for the Yugoslavian Partisan forces.

== Elan SCX ==
Elan SCX changed the world ski industry by inventing sidecut skis, which made carve turns possible at low speeds and with a short turn radius. They were first developed in 1988 by Jurij Franko (not to be confused with the skier Jure Franko), who calculated a suitable flex pattern for the new kind of skis with his colleague Pavel Škofic. They organized a project dubbed SideCut Extreme (SCX) and set out to build prototypes.

== Voyager ==
In early 2021, Elan announced that it created "the world's first fully functional, folding, all-mountain ski".

== Company ==
The Elan Group consists of 20 interlinked companies under the joint ownership of the Skimar company. Most of the group's companies use the Elan brand-name and logo as part of their projects, products and services. The company's headquarters are located in Begunje na Gorenjskem, while its various manufacturing companies are scattered throughout Central Europe: Elan skis and sailing yachts are made in Slovenia, Elan snowboards are manufactured in Austria, and its motor yachts are produced in Croatia. The group markets its products through independent distributors in 46 countries over the world, with marketing taken over by Elan's own companies in North America, Japan, Germany, and Switzerland. On 13 March 2013 Elan's Austrian subsidiary company named "Elan Sportartikelerzeugungs- und Handelsgesellschaft m.b.H." located in Carinthia announced bankruptcy. Elan Austria had liabilities of 8.7 million euro and assets of 6.5 million euro. 78 employees and 120 creditors were affected by this bankruptcy.

The Slovenian state organisation SDH, which is in charge of privatisation activities in Slovenia on behalf of the government, gave its approval for the sale of the "state-owned ski maker Elan to Merrill Lynch International and Wiltan Enterprises Limited"

== See also ==
- Elan snowboards
