= Torsion box =

Class of beam in structural engineering

A torsion box consists of two thin layers of material (skins) on either side of a lightweight core, usually a grid of beams. It is designed to resist torsion under an applied load. A hollow core door is probably the most common example of a torsion box (stressed skin) structure. The principle is to use less material more efficiently. The torsion box uses the properties of its thin surfaces to carry the imposed loads primarily through tension while the close proximity of the enclosed core material compensates for the tendency of the opposite side to buckle under compression.

Torsion boxes are used in the construction of structural insulated panels for houses, wooden tables and doors, skis, snowboards, and airframes - especially wings and vertical stabilizers.

== See also ==
- Tubular bridge and Fairbairn crane, the Victorian invention of the multiple torsion box, for the construction of bridges and cranes in wrought iron.
