= Skate skiing =

Type of cross-country skiing technique

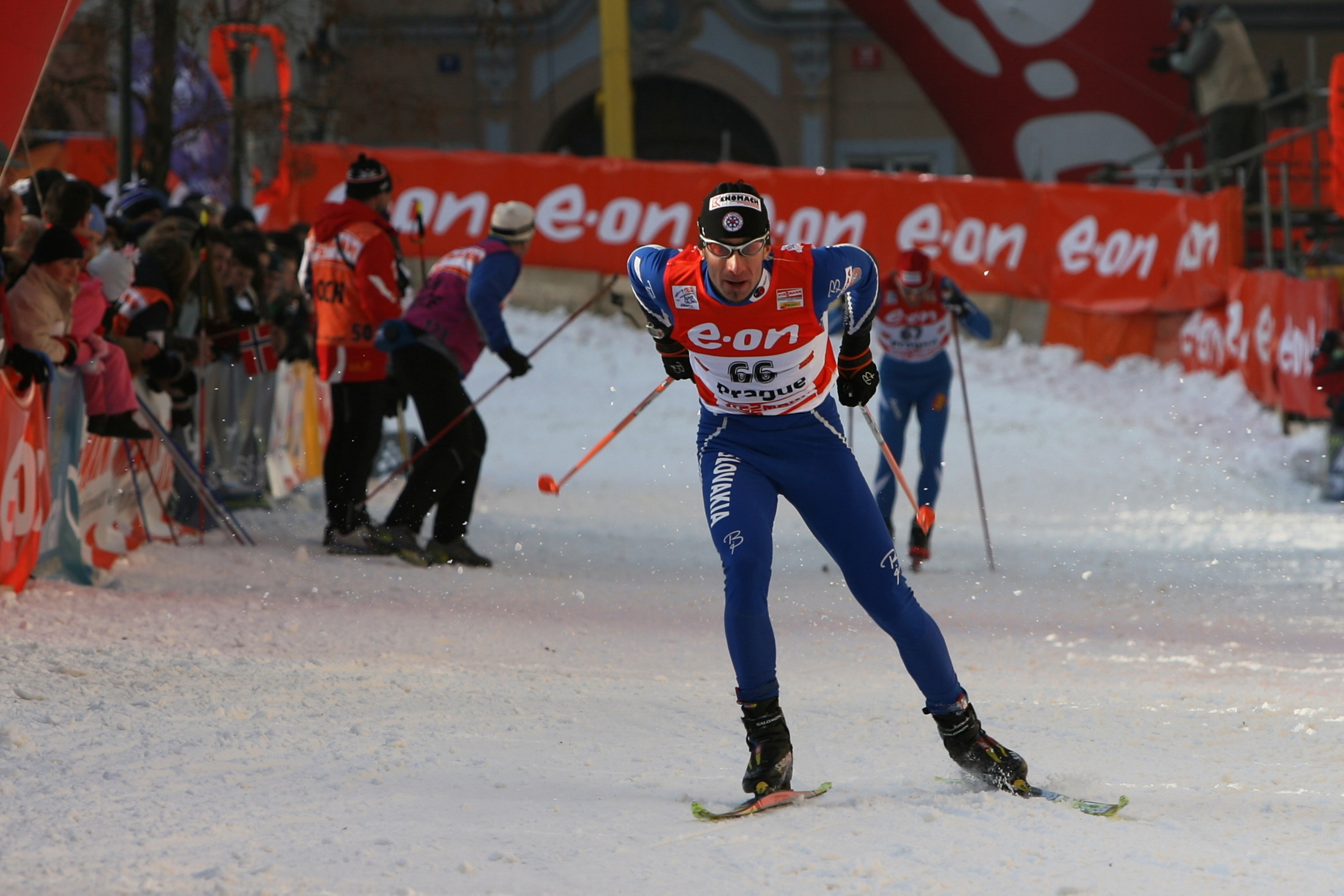
Qualifying competition for the Tour de Ski

Skate skiing is a technique in cross-country skiing where the leg kick is made using the skating step. This style has been established as a revolutionary development of cross-country skiing since the mid-1980s and allows faster movement compared to the normal style. Since 1985, international competitions have been held separately for classic and skating (often called "freestyle").

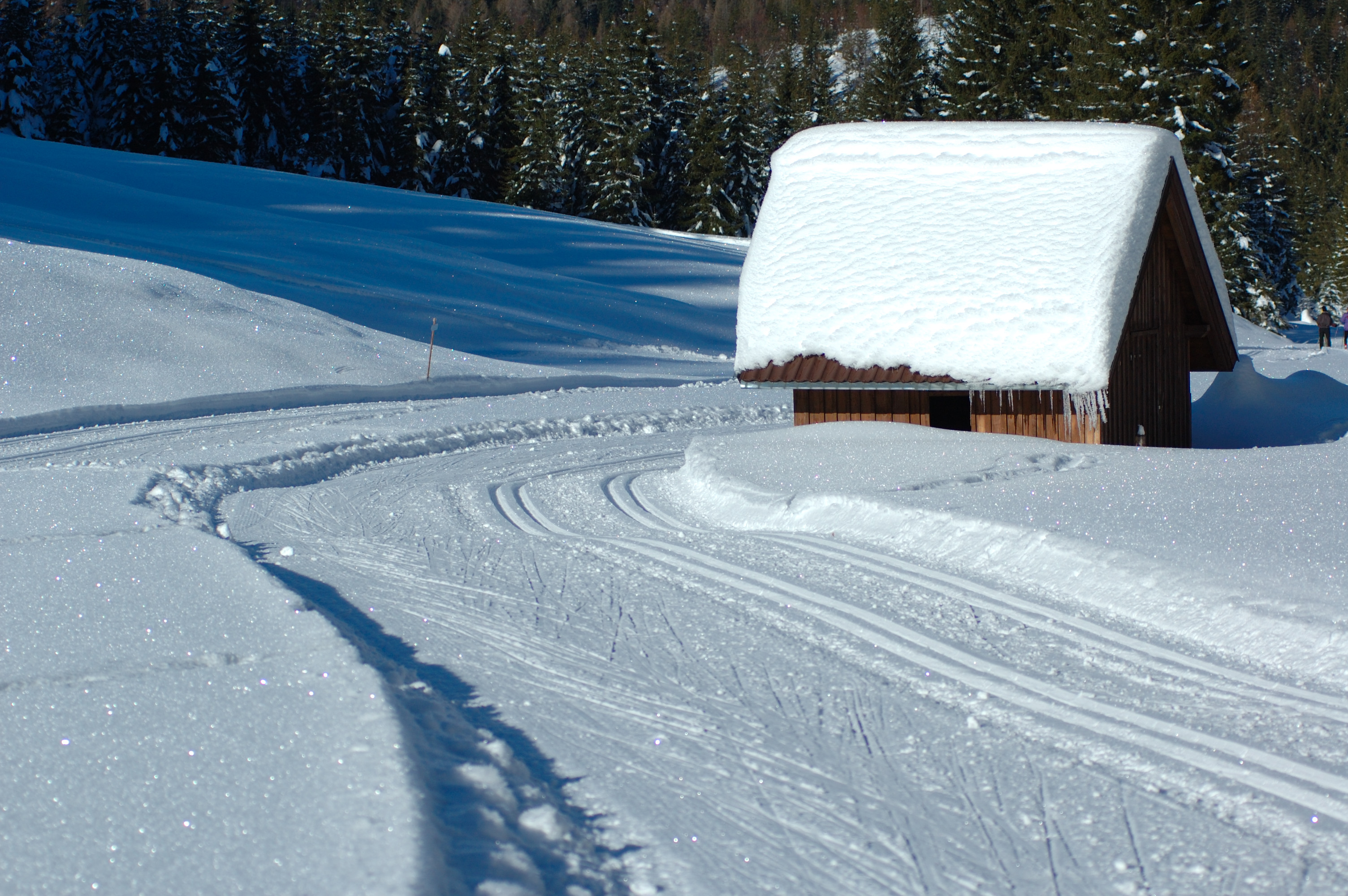
Cross-country skiing trails are often laid out directly next to each other

In contrast to classic skiing, skating skis can be fully optimized for gliding and do not need a grip zone in the center. The skis are typically slightly shorter, while the poles used are slightly longer. Although there are skis designed to accommodate both classic and skating techniques as a compromise, recreational skiers generally use separate equipment for each. Unlike classic trails, skating trails are not groomed but are simply rolled to a sufficient width, providing less lateral stability for the skis. Skating technique is considered more challenging to learn and more physically demanding, especially on climbs, where even the slowest pace requires significant energy. To train for skating during the summer, athletes use roller skis or engage in other activities related to inline skating, particularly those focused on performance.

== History ==
=== Rise of skating ===
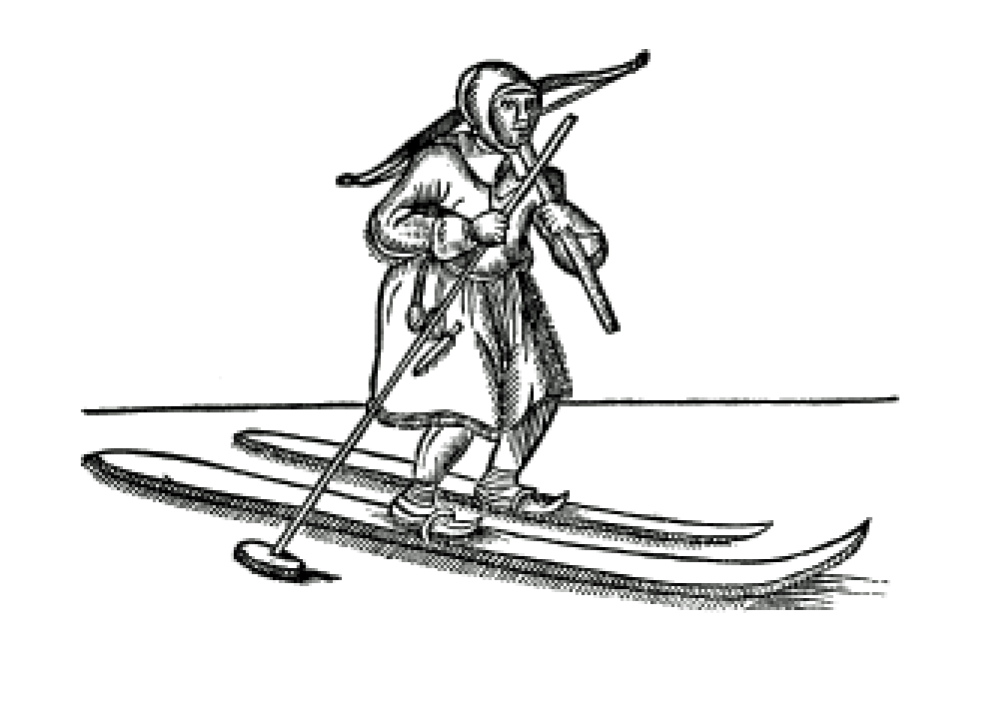
Sámi with plate pole and hunting gear on skis of unequal length

Two techniques have always been part of athlete's technique in cross country skiing: the one-sided skate strides (during changes of direction) and two-sided ones (in the final sprint). In the early 1970s, the first signs of the increased use of the skate stride could be observed. Strictly speaking, the origins of this form of movement lie even earlier: the single pole catapult technique in medieval Scandinavia used two skis of different lengths. The longer one, the glider, was used for gliding and the shorter one, the andor, was used mainly for pushing off and was covered with skins. The locomotion, in which a shearing of the skis was advantageous, bears a marked resemblance to the asymmetrical form of movement used in skating today. An early reference to skate skiing is from Östersund in 1894, performed by Nijllá Mattsson Rimpi (SvD 2025-03-07).

Before the advent of skating, steady improvements in training methods and equipment, as well as the machine-tracking of trails, had led to an increase in running speed and greater use of the double pole thrust in the 20th century, with greater emphasis on upper arm strength. Some races were won on skis prepared exclusively for gliding, with no leg push in the track. New forms of movement developed out of the drive for even higher running speeds.

=== Advance in competitive sports ===
From 1978, especially the stronger popular skiers increasingly used the half-skate step in icy and fast conditions, where one ski stays in the track and the other is sheared out to the side. This technique was initially called Finnstep or Siitonenstep, after Pauli Siitonen, one of the first to use it. This also led to an innovation in the preparation of cross-country ski trails – half-tracked, half-rolled. Later, other forms of movement outside the track were developed. In the World Cup, the US skier Bill Koch was the first to recognize the advantages of this technique. He won the Engadin Marathon with it in 1981 and the overall ranking of the FIS Cross-Country World Cup in 1982.

In the period that followed, there were intense discussions about regulations, with calls for a prohibition on the skating technique emerging from within the amateur sporting community. The diagonal stride (the main form of movement in the classic style) was about to disappear completely from competitive sports, and this could have weakened the possibility of the popular athlete identifying himself with the elite sport. At the 1985 World Championships in Seefeld, an excessively difficult cross-country ski trail was deliberately chosen, where no other technique than the preferred diagonal stride seemed possible. The overwhelming majority of skiers nevertheless used the new technique and thus ensured the final breakthrough.

For the 1985/86 season, the FIS introduced parallel competitions in classic and free technique, with half of the World Cup competitions being held in one of the two techniques. The 1987 World Championships in Oberstdorf and the 1988 Winter Olympics in Calgary were the first major events with the coexistence of classical and skating competitions. In the biathlon and Nordic combined, it was agreed that all competitions would be held in the free technique.

=== Further development ===
As before, most of the top skiers in the cross-country skiing disciplines train in both techniques. The FIS also counteracted specialization by not awarding separate trophies for each technique in the cross-country skiing World Cup, but by holding the same number of races in the classic and free techniques in all competitions. In 1988, pursuit races were introduced, which are run first in the classic technique, then in the free technique. In this case, the skating race is included in the so-called chase start, which means that the start is made according to the time intervals of the first race. Since 2003, this discipline has existed as double pursuit or ski duathlon. Here, the competitions are no longer held on two consecutive days, but directly one after the other, and the change of equipment is also part of the competition.

Athletes in the biathlon and Nordic combined disciplines train almost exclusively in the skating technique, occasionally using the classic way to train endurance rather than technique per se. In contrast, many recreational skiers continue to use mainly the classic technique, some practice both, and few specialize in the skating style. There are still fewer prepared trails for the skating skiing than for the classic. The fears of stress damage to the joints expressed by some sports medicine physicians during the advent of the skating technique have not come true.

== Basic elements ==
The essential basic elements of the skating technique are the skate step and the double pole thrust. The double pole thrust and the other basic elements such as downhill, braking and turning techniques are largely the same as the classic style. By using the skate step, the push off can be done from the sliding, moving ski; in the classic technique, the ski must stop for a short moment during the push off. This is the main reason why skating achieves higher running speeds compared to the classical technique.

=== Skating step ===
Body center of gravity and horizontal leg push-off force during skate stride

The leg movement in skating corresponds to the basic form of the skating step. The impression takes place alternately from the ski gliding obliquely to the direction of movement, which in the final phase of the impression – still gliding – is increasingly clearly tilted up. The body's center of gravity performs a rhythmic pendulum movement at right angles to the direction of movement, with the push-off and gliding phases merging into one another. The angle of the skis depends on the terrain, the speed and the particular form of movement. In the various movement techniques of skating, the use of the pole results in certain variations of the skating stride, especially as far as symmetry is concerned.

During the support phase, two distinctive force peaks occur, with a force minimum in between just before half of the ground contact time. This minimum divides the support phase into two parts of approximately equal length, to which different functional meanings can be assigned. The first force peak coincides with the end of the leg push-off of the opposite side, which ends the short-lived double support phase, i.e. the period during which both skis are in the snow. Towards the end of this phase, the new gliding ski has absorbed the weight-shifting movement from the opposite side. The significantly higher maximum force in the second, somewhat longer section of the support phase reflects the leg push-off. For optimum leg push-off, it is important to feel the maximum possible pressure on the ski edge, even under constantly changing snow and terrain conditions. It is also crucial that the body is neither in forward nor backward position during the main phase of the leg push-off, so that the impact force is transmitted evenly over the entire ski.

=== Double pole thrust ===
In principle, the double pole push corresponds to that of the classic style and is divided into three phases: It begins with a pull phase after the arms swing forward, when the poles enter the snow at a slightly acute angle. The upper body is then brought forward including the hips. Using body weight, the skier now pulls himself towards the poles, bending the elbows to varying degrees depending on speed. Just before the hands pass the knees, the pushing phase begins. The upper body is then in its lowest position. While upper arm, shoulder and back muscles can be used in the pull phase, only the arms work in the push phase. To prolong the pushing phase, the hands can be opened towards the end, still guiding the pole with the thumb and index finger. When the poles leave the snow, the swing phase begins, which lasts until the poles are used again.

In particular, the swing phase varies considerably when using the double pole thrust in the different movement forms of skating. The most similar to the pure double pole thrust of the classic style is the pole use in the arm swing technique, but even here lower maximum forces occur because there is a relief through the leg work. Due to the high frequency of pole use, the average pole force per cycle is higher in the single-stroke than in any other form of movement and therefore requires strong upper body muscles. In the leading arm technique, the peculiarity occurs that the force impact is not the same on both sides, which in other cases corresponds to optimal execution, but is about 20 percent greater on the leading arm side than on the other side. The average pole force per cycle is higher than in any other form of movement.

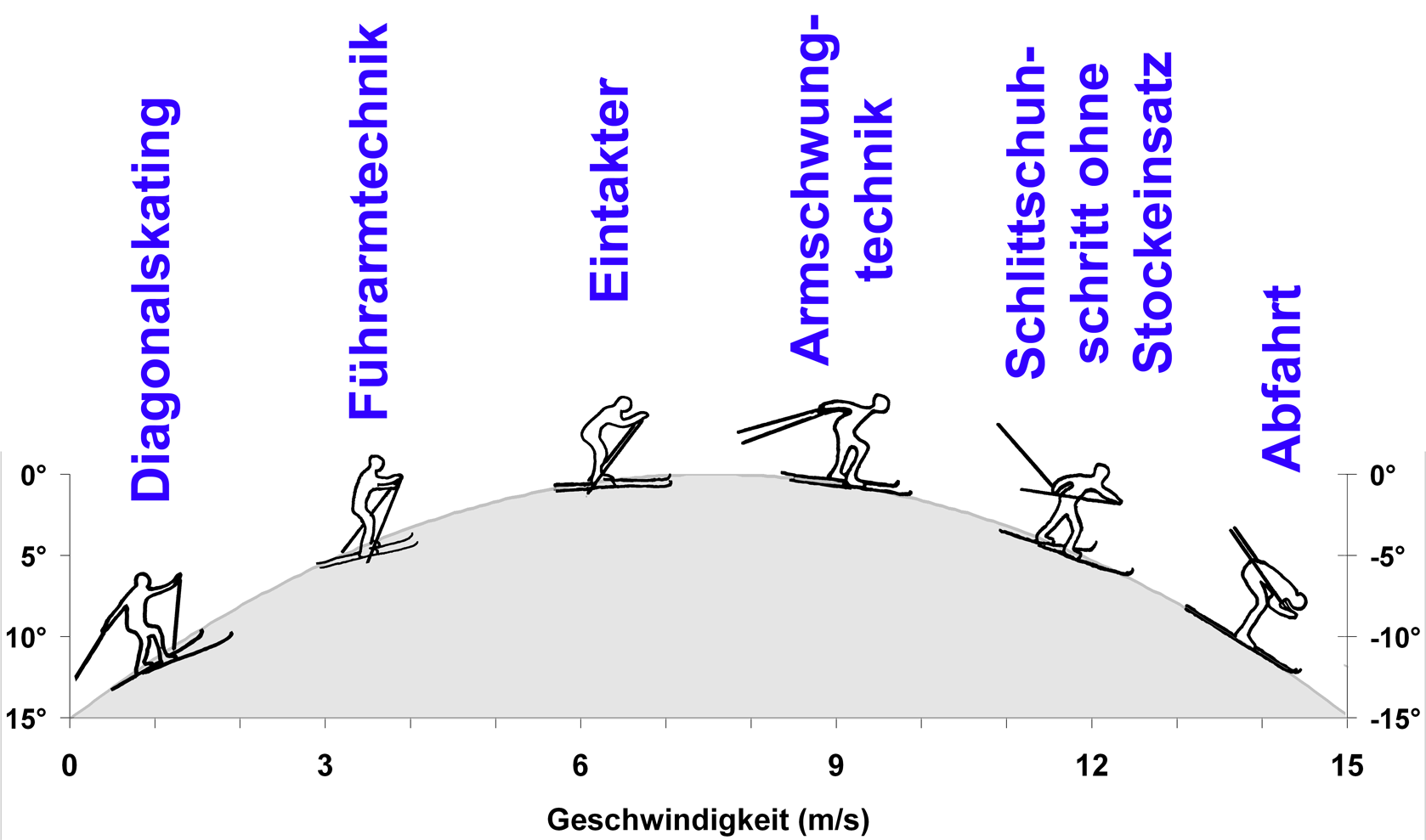
Model representation of technique selection depending on terrain slope and speed

== Movement techniques ==
Depending on the achievable speed, which is mainly determined by the slope of the terrain and other external factors, five main forms of movement can be distinguished. In addition to derived special forms, there are cornering and braking techniques, but these do not differ significantly from the classic technique. Passive downhill and snowplough turn are also not special features of skating.

The naming of the five main techniques often leads to misunderstandings, not least because different variants have become established in German usage. One focuses on the presence of symmetry across the direction of travel and the relationship between leg kick and pole use in the movement forms, while another places the emphasis on the activity of the arms. The so-called five-gear model says nothing about the appearance of the movement form, but is based solely on the speed range for which the particular technique is suitable. The following table provides an overview of the movement forms.

| Aisle | Standardized Terms (USA/Canada) | Description (Note: In the USA, skate techniques are commonly referred to as V1, V2, and V2 alternate while in Canada, they are known as Offset, One Skate, and Two Skate.) | Symmetry | L/S | Additional descriptions |
|---|---|---|---|---|---|
| 1 | None (rare variant) | Diagonal skating | symmetrical | 1/1 | Salamander step, lady step |
| 2 | V1 / Offset | Guide arm technique | asymmetrical | 2/1 | Asymmetrical 2:1, mountain step |
| 3 | V2 / 1 skate | Single-stroke | symmetrical | 1/1 | 1:1 technique, double dance |
| 4 | V2 Alternate / 2 skate | Arm swing technique | asymmetrical | 2/1 | Symmetrical 2:1, pendulum step |
| 5 | Free Skate (no standard V/1-2) | Skate stride without pole use | symmetrical | – | Free Skate |

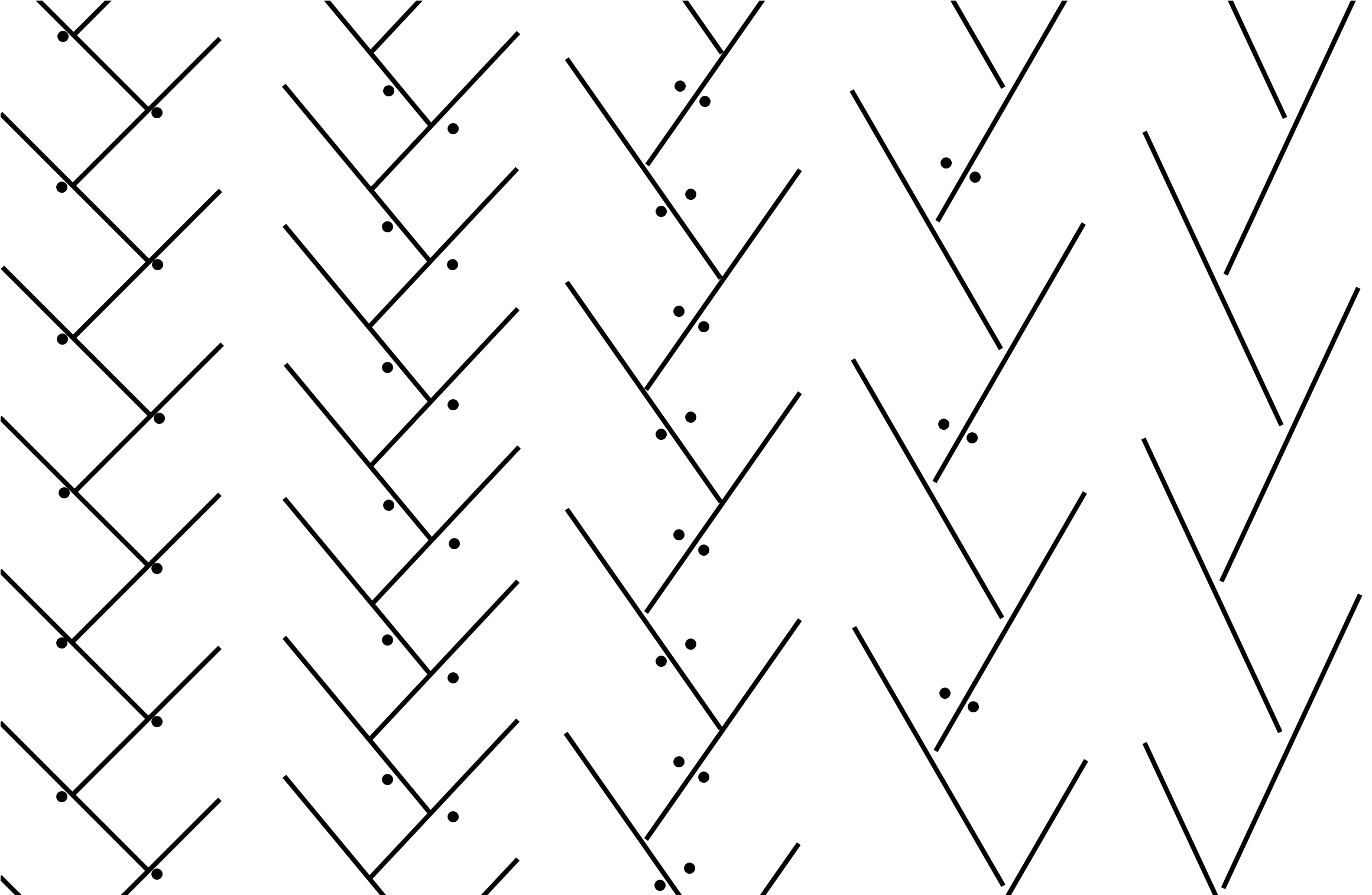
Track pictures of the techniques from the slowest (left) to the fastest.

=== Diagonal skating ===
Diagonal skating is a pure uphill technique used for steep climbs. It is a symmetrical technique and the only main form of movement in which the poles are not used simultaneously, but individually. When setting off, it starts as a pace movement – pole use with simultaneous leg push-off on the same side – but turns into a diagonal movement, then, as in the diagonal step of the classic technique, one arm comes forward at the same time as the opposite ski. The skis are presented on the shortest path, so there is no leg lock. The upper body turns on the gliding ski, but does not go with the pole. If a gliding phase is no longer possible on a greater incline, this form of movement corresponds to the burr step of the classic technique.

Diagonal skating is very rarely seen in competition. Even by recreational skaters it is used only occasionally, usually only when a glide phase is no longer possible. The reason for this is that it is not trained enough compared to the other forms of movement and is therefore poorly executed.

=== Guide arm technique/V1 ===
Guide arm technique on a slight incline on a cross-country ski trail

For climbs and in difficult terrain, the lead arm technique is suitable. This is the most asymmetrical of the main movement forms, only every second leg push-off is a double pole push. The leg movement is an asymmetrical skate step with main push-off leg and main sliding leg. The pole work does not correspond to the classic double pole push, the arm on the side of the main gliding leg is the guide arm. The pole of the guide arm is placed relatively vertically close to the ski, the other much lower obliquely in front of the body. Both poles and the ski of the main gliding leg get contact with snow at the same time. The body makes a relatively strong pendulum motion transverse to the direction of movement, with the position somewhat erect on the side of the main push-off leg, but quite low on the other side; one drops, so to speak, onto the main gliding leg. The arm and body movement appears to be motion related to stand-up paddling.

Due to its versatility, this technique is the most important in skating, especially in recreational sports. This form of movement is also suitable for transversely inclined sections of the trail, with the guide arm on the uphill side. Regardless of the terrain, it is advantageous to change sides from time to time, as the type and intensity of muscle strain on both sides differs significantly. For a side change, two skate steps can be performed in succession without the use of a pole. Alternatively, a short, indicated pole use can initiate the change, which is immediately followed at the next step by the next pole use with the guide arm changed.

No form of movement in skating shows so many individual variations. For example, the poles are often not set at the same time, but the pole of the guide arm side follows a little later. In addition, there is also the jumped form, which requires high strength endurance and is therefore practically only used in competition. Here, the main push-off leg is bent more strongly and the already short gliding phase on this side is deliberately interrupted. From the leg flexion, a space-grasping jump is executed in the direction of the main gliding leg, and the pole use begins during the flight phase.

Single stroke in slight incline

=== Single-stroke/V2 ===
The fully symmetrical single-beat is a very powerful form of movement that also requires great coordination skills. With each step, there is also a supportive double pole thrust. This technique is used primarily on easy climbs, for acceleration and as a sprint form in the finish area of competition courses. Slightly before the leg push-off, the pole insertion takes place, the poles are used roughly parallel to the still gliding ski, the upper body is bent in the direction of the gliding ski. The pole work is performed before the leg push-off is completed with the leg extended. After lifting off the push-off ski, the upper body straightens up, the entire weight is shifted to the sliding ski on the opposite side until the body's center of gravity is above the sliding ski. Since the double pole thrust must be executed at a high frequency, it is not possible to swing the arms forward as actively as in the arm swing technique.

This technique requires not only high strength endurance, but also a very secure sense of balance when gliding on a ski, which is especially difficult when the track is poor. That is why this form of movement is seen somewhat less often in recreational sports. However, it is also the most dispensable main form of movement, since there are only a few sections of cross-country skiing where guide arm or arm swing techniques are not a perfectly suitable alternative. On the other hand, this technique is also said to have the greatest movement aesthetics.

=== Arm swing technique/V2 Alt ===
Arm swing technique in slightly sloping track

The arm swing technique is one of the symmetrical forms of movement, although it is obviously not completely symmetrical, since the double pole thrust only occurs at every second step, i.e. only on one side as in the lead arm technique. Nevertheless, the arm swing technique exhibits considerably greater symmetry than the lead arm technique, especially in terms of footwork and tracking. The arm swing technique is mainly used on slightly sloping terrain or to maintain a high speed on the flat. The movement sequence is similar to the single stroke, as with this the double pole push occurs in the direction of the sliding ski. The leg push-off begins after the pole insertion, this is a significant difference from the guide arm technique and allows to maintain an accelerating force for a longer period of time. Only in good trail conditions or sufficient skill is it possible to almost complete the double pole thrust on the gliding ski before the leg push-off begins. The weight transfer takes place completely on the other ski. In contrast to the single stroke, the body's center of gravity is not only lowered during the double pole thrust when the arms are swung through, but also in a mirror image during the forward swing of the arms, which is initiated slightly before the leg push-off on the opposite side. This active forward swing of the arms also contributes to propulsion.

Since this technique is also not completely symmetrical, it is advantageous to change sides from time to time. As with the guide arm technique, this change is possible by two successive steps without the use of a pole or by double pole thrusts directly following one another. With the latter variant, several double pole strokes can also follow directly one after the other – thus the side change takes place in connection with a brief change to the single pole. In cross-country skiing sections, it is advantageous to execute the double pole thrust on the ski on the valley side, but the side selection adapted to the terrain is not as decisive as with the guide arm technique.

=== Free skate ===
The largest gear of the five-speed model is sometimes abbreviated and somewhat misleadingly referred to simply as the skate stride. This form of movement is used when, due to excessive speed, it is no longer economically possible to accelerate with a double pole push. The poles can be clamped under the arms or pressed horizontally against the body. The opening angle is very small, the gliding phases are as long as possible. To reduce drag, a low stance can be adopted. At even higher speeds, there is no more leg push-off and the body position corresponds to the downhill squat.

With this form of movement, even somewhat steeper downhill sections can still be supported in an accelerating manner. The pure skating stride is also used for target sprints or for acceleration at the start. In particular, the arms are then actively swung along with the poles drawn up to the forearm, as in long-track speed skating. However, this requires a lot of free space in order not to endanger other track users or competitors. Also, the skating stride without the use of poles can already be used at lower speeds to recover the arm muscles. This is practiced this way in biathlon before shooting, for example.

=== Other techniques ===
More for historical reasons, there is the Siitonen step as another technique of skating, as it played an essential role in the transition from classic to skating style. It is a half-skate step in which one ski glides in the track of the track while the other is sheared out sideways. The push off of the sheared out and edged ski is assisted by a double pole push. Since the preparation of separate trails for the two styles, the Siitonen step is still practiced mainly by skiers who want to switch from the classic to the free technique as a learning aid.

The downhill and braking techniques did not differ from those of the classic technique. Compared to the latter, the more stable fixation by boot and binding is advantageous and facilitates the execution, for example, when snowplough turn.

A distinction is made between the passive and active curve treading techniques. Passive stepping on the bow, also known as stepping around, is executed in the same way as the classic style: the ski on the outside of the bow is only loaded briefly in order to be able to lift the unloaded inner ski at the front and turn it inwards. Afterwards, the unloaded outer ski is pulled in and tracked. While passive bowing is performed without the use of a pole, active bowing is supported by a dynamic double pole thrust on the inner ski of the bow. A strong push-off is required from the outer ski. Compared to the passive variant, the active bow kicking is used at lower speeds or larger curve radii and enables the speed to be maintained or even increased in curves.

== Equipment and ski preparation ==
The equipment for practicing the skating technique is only partly the same as for the classic style. Almost always different skis, bindings and usually different boots are used. The poles are basically the same, only they should be on average 10 centimeters longer for skating. In other cross-country skiing clothing, there are no significant differences in the two styles.

=== Ski ===
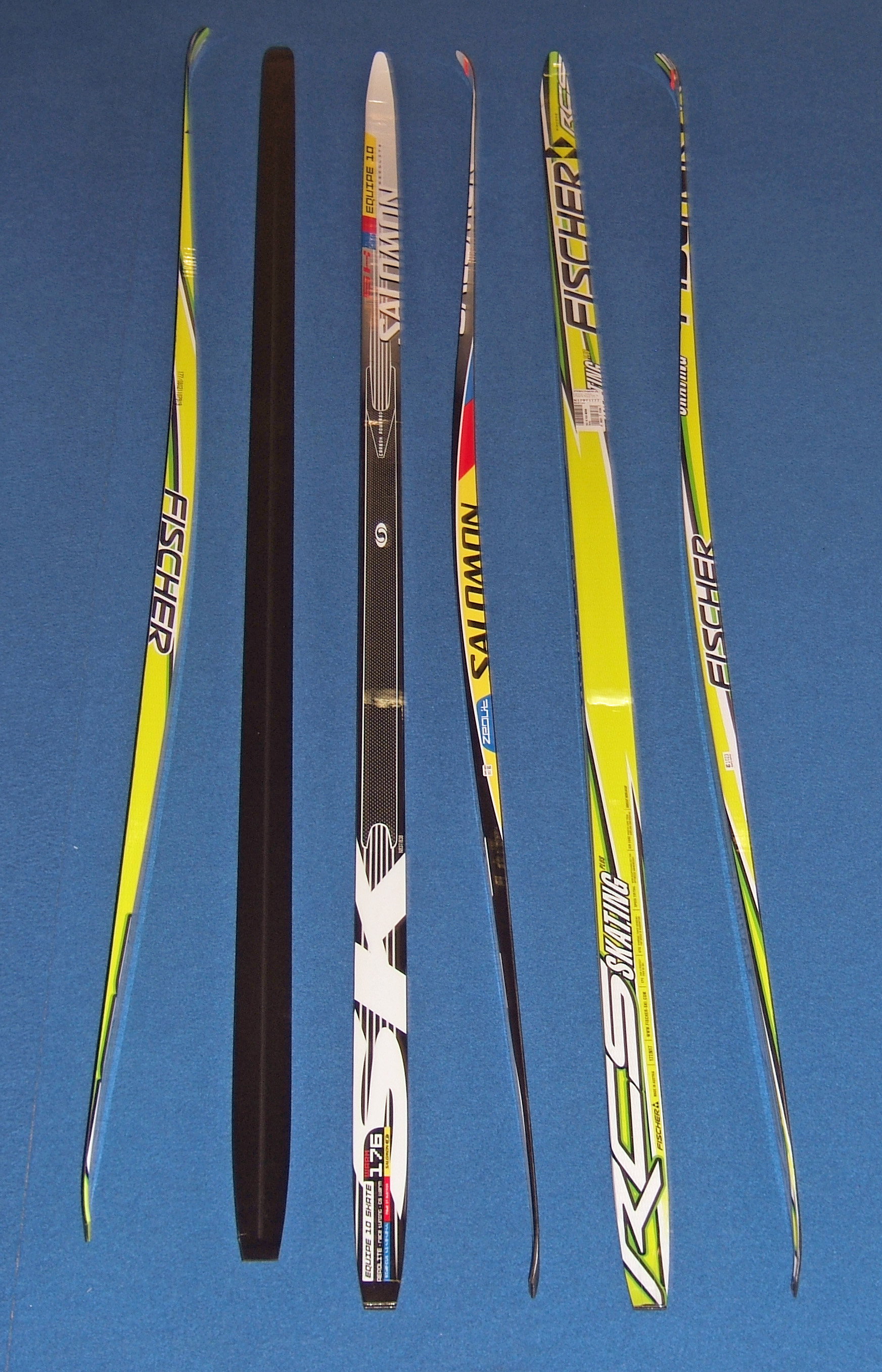
Different models of skis for skating

Unlike skis for the classic technique, skating skis are designed entirely for gliding, so there is no adhesion zone in the center of the ski. Another important aspect of skating skis is the lateral stability and torsion, which ensures the most even distribution of the push-off force to the base. Like classic skis, skating skis have camber and preload. This is even stronger, even when a ski is loaded with the entire body weight, the center of the skating ski should not be completely pushed through. The aim of this design is to distribute the pressure as evenly as possible over the entire ski surface, as this ensures the best gliding properties. The pretension and elastic deformation of the ski also allow some of the energy invested during push-off to be subsequently converted into propulsion energy.

As in alpine skiing, the ski width is not the same for the entire ski. The intention is not to increase the turning ability of the ski, but to support an even footprint over the entire ski and to achieve good gliding properties. Waist width variations were common in the past, but manufacturers now adopt more uniformed measures. Skis tend to be narrower in the front than in the back. On average, the ski width is about 43 millimeters, although it usually varies by less than four millimeters. Weight plays a more important role in skating skiing than in the classic technique, since the ski is lifted off the snow for a considerable part of the time. Since weight reduction cannot be achieved at the expense of stability, techniques and experience from aircraft construction have been used to optimize the weight of the ski. There are skis weighing less than one kilogram.

For the selection of a suitable ski, there are models with different length and hardness (stiffness). In determining these individual parameters, the body weight and the intended intensity of the practice of the sport are primarily considered; the height is a secondary parameter. Compared to the classic technique, shorter skis are used: the maximum ski length is only slightly above 1.90 meters. Longer skis would have better gliding properties, but would be a hindrance in narrow passages and especially on climbs, also because the ends of the skis would cross over too far at a large shearing angle.

There are also combination models that can be used for the classic and skating technique. When used in the classic technique, a climbing wax is applied in the center of the ski, while in skating the ski is prepared throughout for gliding. However, such so-called all-round skis are less common.

=== Bindings and shoes ===
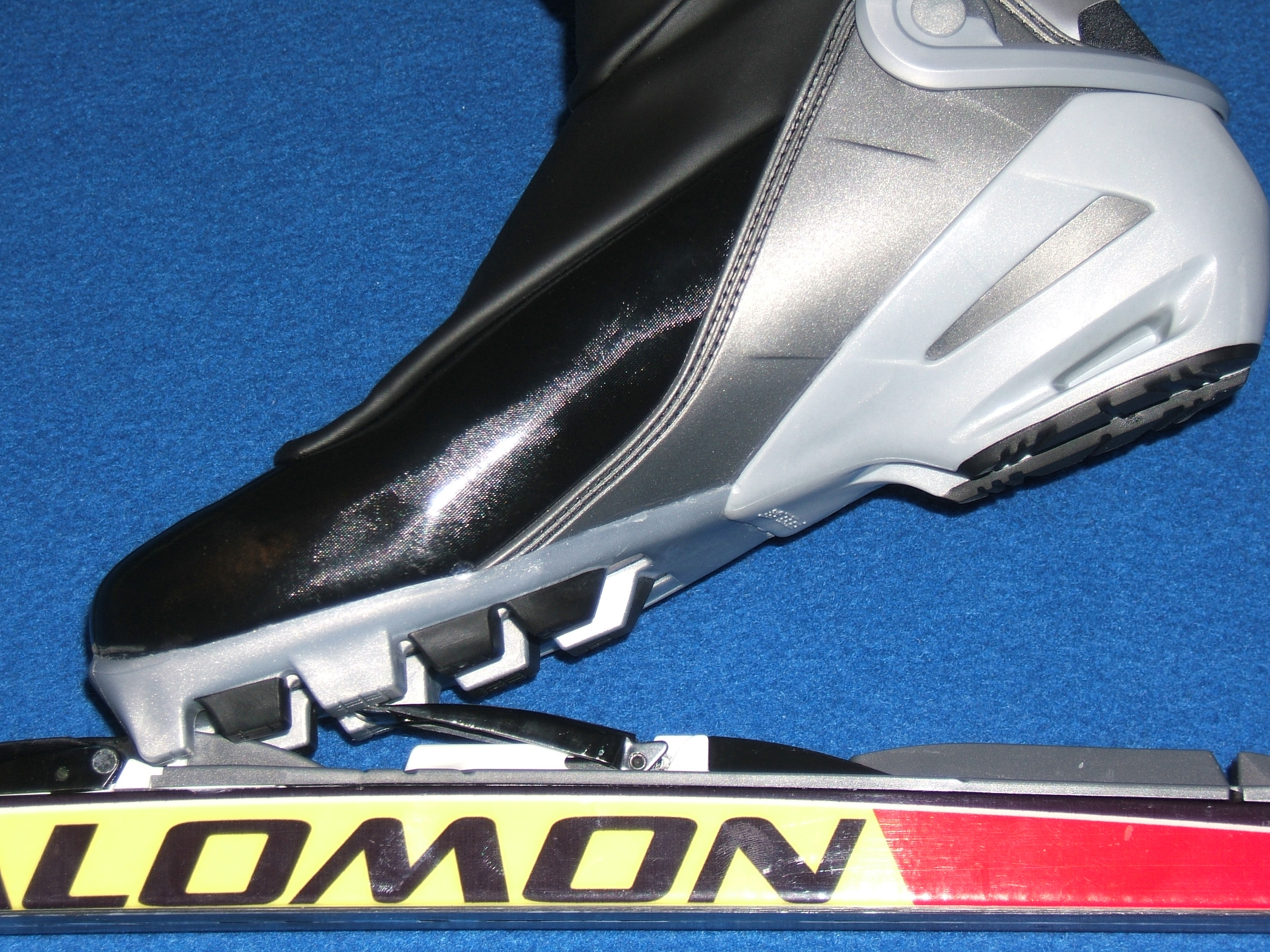
Shoe and binding

In terms of bindings, there are two systems that practically share the world market: NNN (New Nordic Norm) by Rottefella and SNS (Salomon Nordic System). These are not compatible, since the type of binding must be matched to the boot, but not to the ski. In both systems there are special skating bindings, where the connection with the ski is more stable compared to the classic technique. The boot is attached under the ball of the foot and not just at the toe of the boot, as is usually the case with the classic style. A rubber pin or spring makes it easier to pull the ski towards the sole of the foot and prevents the ski from falling off the front. There are bindings where this spring force is adjustable, making them suitable for both techniques, since a stronger force is advantageous in skating.

A skating boot is cut higher compared to a classic model. The sole is relatively hard and therefore torsionally stiff. The axis of motion supports the activity of the upper ankle joint to match the motion sequence when skating. There are also more shoe models that are suitable for both styles. This also applies to competitive sports, as since 2003 in the double pursuit both techniques are skated directly behind each other in one competition.

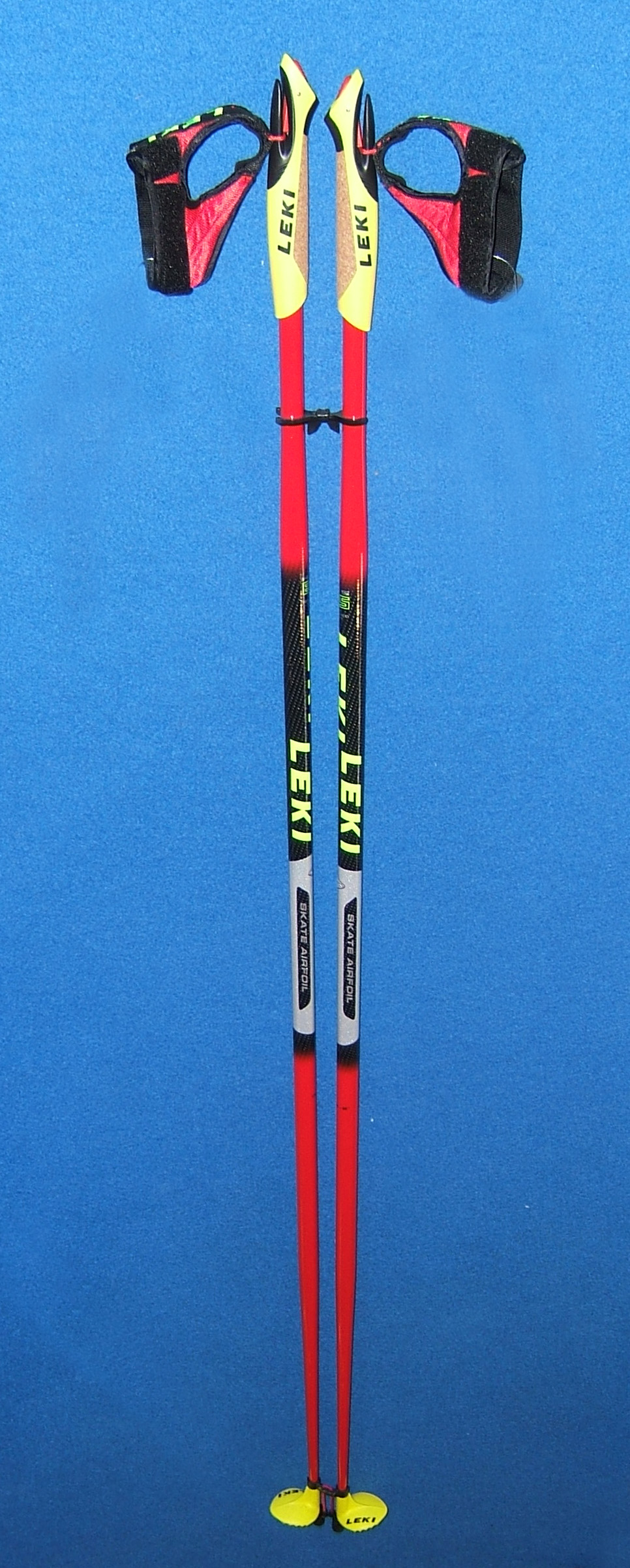
Poles suitable for skating

=== Poles ===
The construction of the ski pole corresponds to the classical technique. It is a hollow tube with a handle and loop at the top and a tip and a pole plate at the bottom. The optimal pole should be as light as possible and resistant to breakage, which are opposing requirements in terms of manufacturing technology, especially for very long poles. The tube material used is usually carbon or aluminum. There are also cross-country ski poles with adjustable length.

As a rule, slightly longer poles are used for skating than for the classic style; the optimum length is between 85 and 90 percent of the body height. Longer poles can be advantageous at higher levels of performance. Shorter poles are more beneficial for sprinting distances or steep climbs.

With the emergence of the skating technique at the end of the 1980s, extremely long poles were preferred, the length of which sometimes even exceeded the body height, so that pole support was possible even at high speeds. Studies carried out in 1993 showed that the optimal pole length is very individual and depends on technical and physical conditions. Most of the runners studied could be recommended to use shorter poles than before.

=== Skiing preparation ===
The rise of the skating technique was associated with the confidence that the preparation of the skis would become easier, since "only" the gliding ability would have to be optimized. In the field of competitive sports, this hope has not been fulfilled, since good gliding ability is of even more decisive importance in skating than in the classic technique, and optimization efforts in this area have therefore taken on unexpected dimensions.

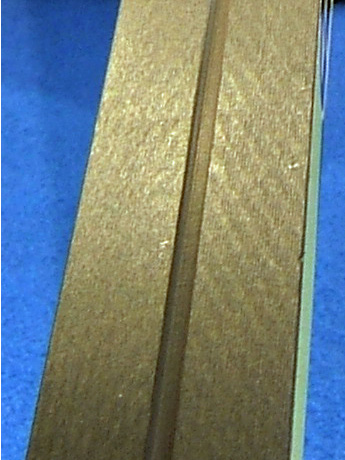
Grinding of a brand new ski

Three main factors are distinguished when optimizing glide: the grind, the structure and the waxing. Grinding and structure primarily determine how the melt water created by the pressure of gliding under the ski is displaced and guided along under the ski. In particular, it is important to avoid suction effects. The structure represents a refinement of the grind. A commercially purchased ski already has a grind, usually a universally oriented one, but there are also skis already specially prepared for cold or warmer conditions. The grind is cut into the ski with a special grindstone and diamond and can only be removed by regrinding. The structure is pressed into the ground base. A linear, coarse structure is suitable for wet snow, while fine cross structures are more suitable for dry conditions with crystalline snow. There are handy devices for applying the structure, but their use is almost exclusively limited to racing. Like the wax, the structure disappears after repeated use.

Waxing is considered to be about as important as grinding and structure. When waxing, a distinction is made between liquid and hot waxes. Liquid waxes are the easiest to use; they are simply applied and polished, which can also be done on the trail. Hot waxes are applied with the help of a precisely temperature-controlled clothes iron. The main hot wax used in recreational sports is paraffin wax, which is available for different temperature ranges. Somewhat higher-quality fluorinated wax is used in the same way as kerosene wax. In the field of competitive sports, there are other processes, some of which are combined, such as pure fluorine wax, wax based on nanotechnology, and special powders or sprays.

== Recent developments and research ==
Several attempts were made to adapt the concept of the clap skate, which revolutionized long-track speed skating in the mid-1990s, for the skating technique in cross-country skiing. This was not expected to have such a resounding effect as in speed skating, since the binding in skating anyway allows for quite a long contact with the ground with the ski lying flat during the push-off. Nevertheless, tests have shown that a construction based on the folding skate can bring advantages at least on short sprint distances and on putting less strain on the gastrocnemius muscles. Because of the torsionally stiff construction, the boot can be cut lower; this allows for increased ankle range of motion. Such a system was used for the first time in the 2006–07 FIS Cross-Country World Cup.

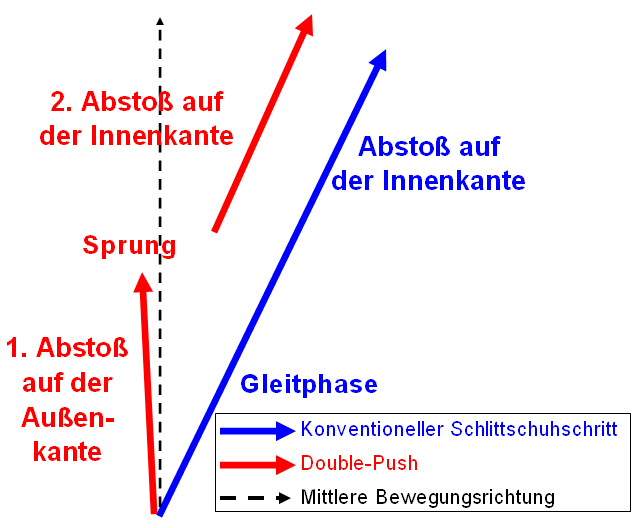
Schematic diagram of conventional skate step and double push technique for right ski

In the sprint races, innovations in the forms of movement can also be seen. On the one hand, the jumped form of the single-beater, on the other hand, the transfer of the double-push originating from inline speed skating. Here, the ski is not set down flat as is normally the case when the gliding phase is initiated, but on the outer edge and also turned slightly inward to enable a further accelerating push-off impulse. Compared to inline skating, the disadvantage is that the direction of the ski gliding in the snow cannot be continuously turned outward to the position of the normal inside-edged push. However, this change of direction must be accomplished with a jump. In trials over a short sprint distance, skiers were on average about 3 percent faster when using the double-push in single-stroke compared to the conventional technique. The double-push requires more muscle activity, and the applicability of this innovation is also probably limited to start and finish sprints or tactical intermediate sprints in sprint races due to the high technical requirements.

In international ski racing, a stronger focus on training quality can be observed in the training design of the successful nations, as the load level has reached a level where an increase no longer causes effective adaptation effects. Based on quantitative and qualitative biomechanical analyses of recent years, specific methods and equipment are being developed to train, for example, speed strength and strength endurance specifically for the movement forms of the skating technique. From today's perspective, a further development of the existing running techniques and also of the material are the reserves to further increase the performance capacity. For example, Sandbakk et al. (2014) found that the cornering speed and technique in downhill running depends mainly on the fast strength and the maximum strength of the legs, characteristics that are not necessarily conducive to maximum endurance.

== Roller Ski ==
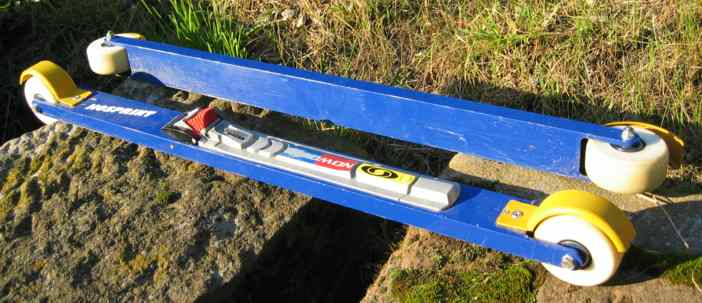
Training roller ski for skating or classic technique

To be able to train technique, coordination and condition in summer in a way that is as specific as possible to the sport, skating ski rollers are used or related varieties of Nordic Blading are practiced, especially by competitive athletes in summer.

On roller skis, all forms of movement of the skating technique can be implemented and come quite close to cross-country skiing. A significant difference results from the fact that the rolling friction on the roller ski is only about a quarter of the sliding friction on the ski, therefore the speeds on the roller ski are significantly higher than on skis. On roller skis, this leads to an increase in the total cycle time and also to different time proportions of the partial cycles, which results in altered kinesthetics.

When using poles, it is often not possible, especially on asphalt, to maintain thrust for a comparable length of time as in snow as the angle of penetration becomes more acute, because the poles slip away. There are also clear differences in leg push-off due to the change in conditions: a much higher outer edge load occurs with roller skiing, and the bipedal nature of the force curve during the push-off phase is also much less pronounced than when using skis, especially on the ball of the foot. In the case of roller skiing, the force curve is much more pronounced.

== Target group and learning process ==
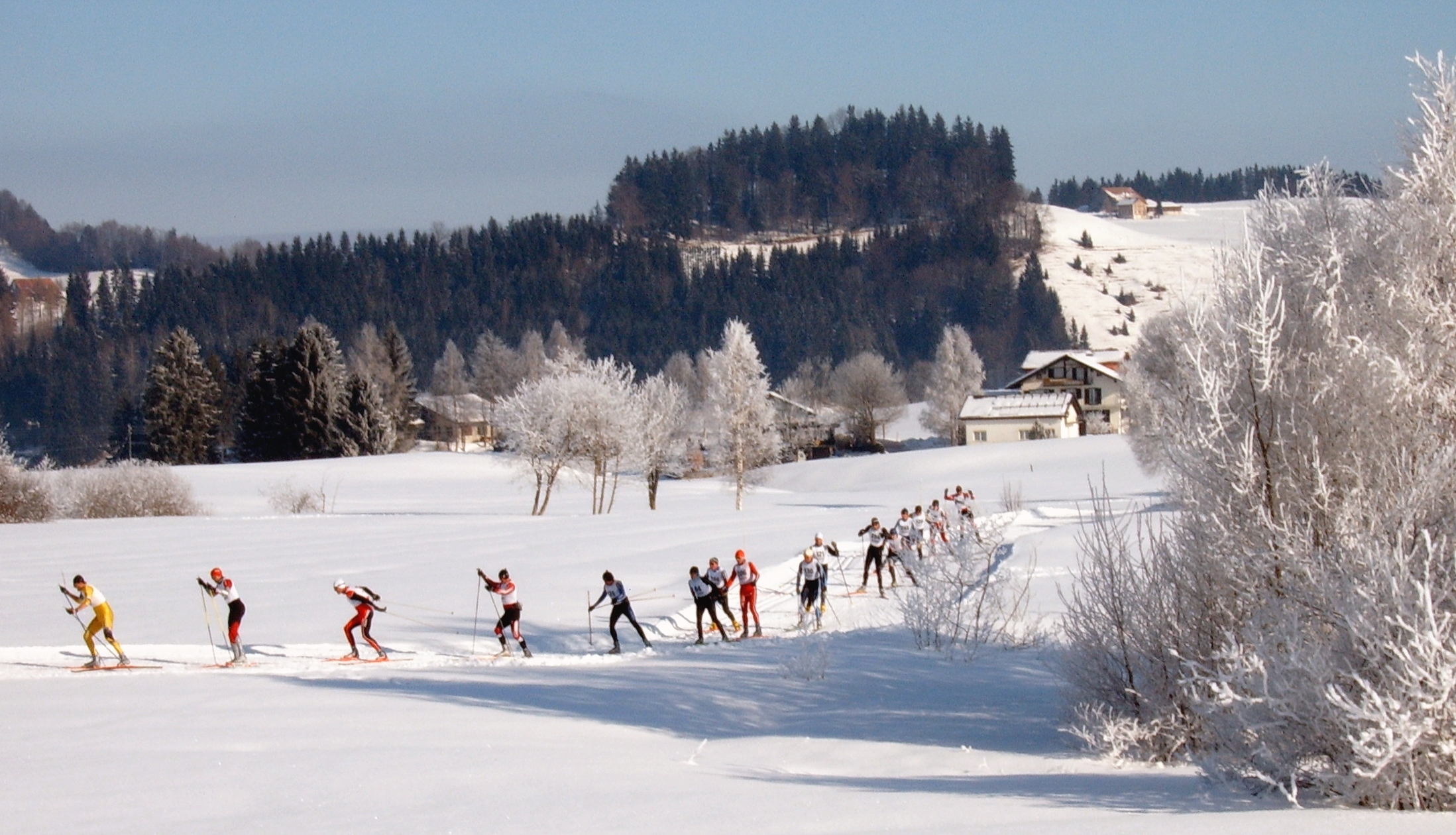
Cross-country skier running in skating technique near Einsiedeln in Switzerland

The practice of the skating technique away from prepared trails is only possible under special conditions – for example, on a hard frozen snow cover or on a frozen lake with a light layer of snow. With skating, the sporting aspect is usually more in the foreground than with running in the classic technique, and even more so compared to its modern wellness-oriented variation, Nordic cruising.

The slowest possible execution of skating requires increased energy provision compared to the classic style. This is even more true in the early learning phase of the skating technique, as it requires certain technical skills to go up steep inclines at a slow pace without losing rhythm. One focus of the learning process is to train the sense of balance for gliding on a ski. Initially, there is often no complete weight transfer to the gliding ski and the skier's center of gravity is constantly almost centrally located between the two skis. Studies have shown that even in top skiers, the head initiates the lateral movement when weight is shifted. This can be used in terms of training methodology, as the skater can consciously check whether the direction of gaze is oriented toward the tip of the gliding ski after weight shifting. Another hurdle in learning the skating technique is the only apparent similarity of the lead arm and arm swing techniques, as both forms of movement involve a double pole thrust every other step. This creates the danger of not being able to cleanly separate these techniques.

== Bibliography ==
- Stefan Lindinger: Biomechanische Analysen von Skatingtechniken im Skilanglauf. Meyer & Meyer Verlag, Aachen 2006, ISBN 3-89899-105-9.
- Kuno Hottenrott, Veit Urban: Das große Buch vom Skilanglauf. Meyer & Meyer Verlag, Aachen 2004. ISBN 3-89124-992-6.
- Egon Theiner, Chris Karl: Skilanglauf: Geschichte, Kultur, Praxis. Verlag Die Werkstatt, Göttingen 2002, ISBN 3-89533-371-9.
- Deutscher Skiverband (DSV, Hrsg.): Offizieller DSV-Lehrplan Skilanglauf: Technik, Unterrichten, Praxis. Pietsch Verlag, Stuttgart 2013, ISBN 3-613-50712-9.
- Ulricht Wenger, Franz Wöllzenmüller: Skilanglauf: klassische Technik und Skating. sportinform Verlag, München 1995, ISBN 3-8254-0423-4
