= Arlberg-Kandahar =

Annual alpine skiing event

The Arlberg-Kandahar race (often abbreviated A-K or AK) is an annual alpine skiing event. The first edition of the race was held in 1928 in St. Anton, in the Arlberg district of Austria. The location originally alternated between St. Anton and Mürren, Switzerland. Later, it began to be held in other locations as well, such as Chamonix, France, Sestriere, Italy, and Garmisch-Partenkirchen, Germany.

== Name ==
The two organizers of the original 1928 race were the Ski Club Arlberg in Austria and the British Kandahar Ski Club, based in Mürren. The latter is named after the British military commander Frederick Roberts, Earl of Kandahar, the major benefactor of the club. (At the first downhill race organized by skiing pioneer Arnold Lunn, held at Crans-Montana in 1911, Roberts donated the trophy, the Roberts of Kandahar Challenge Cup.)

== History ==
Lunn, founder of the Kandahar Ski Club, met Hannes Schneider of the Ski Club Arlberg in 1927. Together they organized the first slalom race in Arlberg, held at St. Anton. The event was successful, so on March 3 and 4 of the following year they held the first Arlberg-Kandahar races. The slalom and downhill events constituted the first alpine combined events in the history of alpine racing. 45 racers from Austria, Switzerland, the United Kingdom, and the United States took part. Within two years, the popularity of the event brought a major success: in 1930, the International Ski Federation recognized alpine skiing events in addition to the traditional Nordic disciplines.

From 1931 until the Second World War, the races were alternately held at Arlberg and Mürren. In 1948, Chamonix became the third host, followed by Sestriere in 1951 and Garmisch-Partenkirchen in 1954. Until the introduction of the World Cup in 1967, the A-K races were the most important alpine ski races besides the Winter Olympics and the World Championships.

In the World Cup era, the Arlberg-Kandahar races have continued to be held as part of the World Cup, but their importance has diminished. The word "Kandahar" is still found in the names of many legendary race courses, such as the "Kandahar Garmisch" in Germany, the "Kandahar" event at Chamonix and the spectacular "Kandahar Banchetta" course in Sestriere that hosted the 1997 FIS World Championships, the 2006 Olympics, as well as several World Cup races including the 'Big' Finals in 2004.

== See also ==
- Kandahar Ski Club
- Kandahar (ski course)
- Arlberg-Kandahar-Rennen (in German)
