= Snowplough turn =

Downhill skiing technique

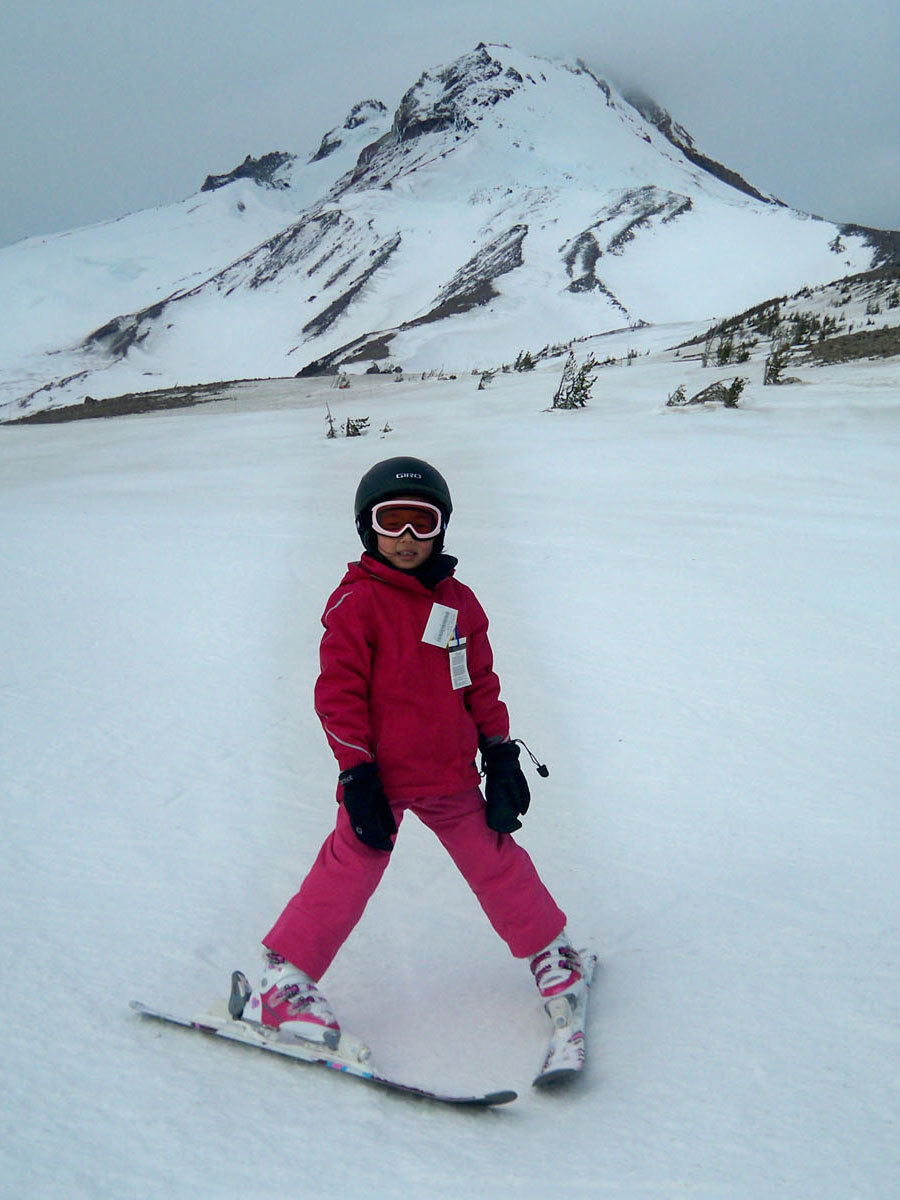
The snowplough turn

The snowplough turn, snowplow turn, or wedge turn is a downhill skiing braking and turning technique. It is the first turn taught to beginners, but still is useful to advanced skiers on steep slopes.

== Technique ==
The front ski tips of the skis are together and the tails wide apart, with the knees rolled inwards slightly. By applying pressure against the snow with the inside edges of the skis speed is reduced, making turning in such a configuration and stopping completely possible. To turn, weight is shifted from the downhill, outside-of-the-turn ski to the uphill, inside-of-the-turn ski. As the turn is completed, the old uphill, inside ski then becomes the new downhill, outside ski. Successful completion of the technique in both directions leads to linked turns.

== Applications ==
In ski instruction, the snowplough is a primary building block of skiing proficiency. Under the Arlberg technique for teaching skiing, beginners start with the snowplough then proceed to Stem Christie and then the parallel turn as their skills improve. It may be thought of as the foundation for controlling individual skis. A ski coach can analyze the underlying abilities of expert skiers by watching them do a snowplow. Proficient skiers may apply the technique with a narrower angle between the skis as a "wedge turn".

In ski mountaineering, the snowplough is recognized as an important way to come to a complete stop on steep slopes. On steep slopes, a wedge turn can also provide a safe way to transition through the fall-line.
