= Stem christie =

Skiing technique

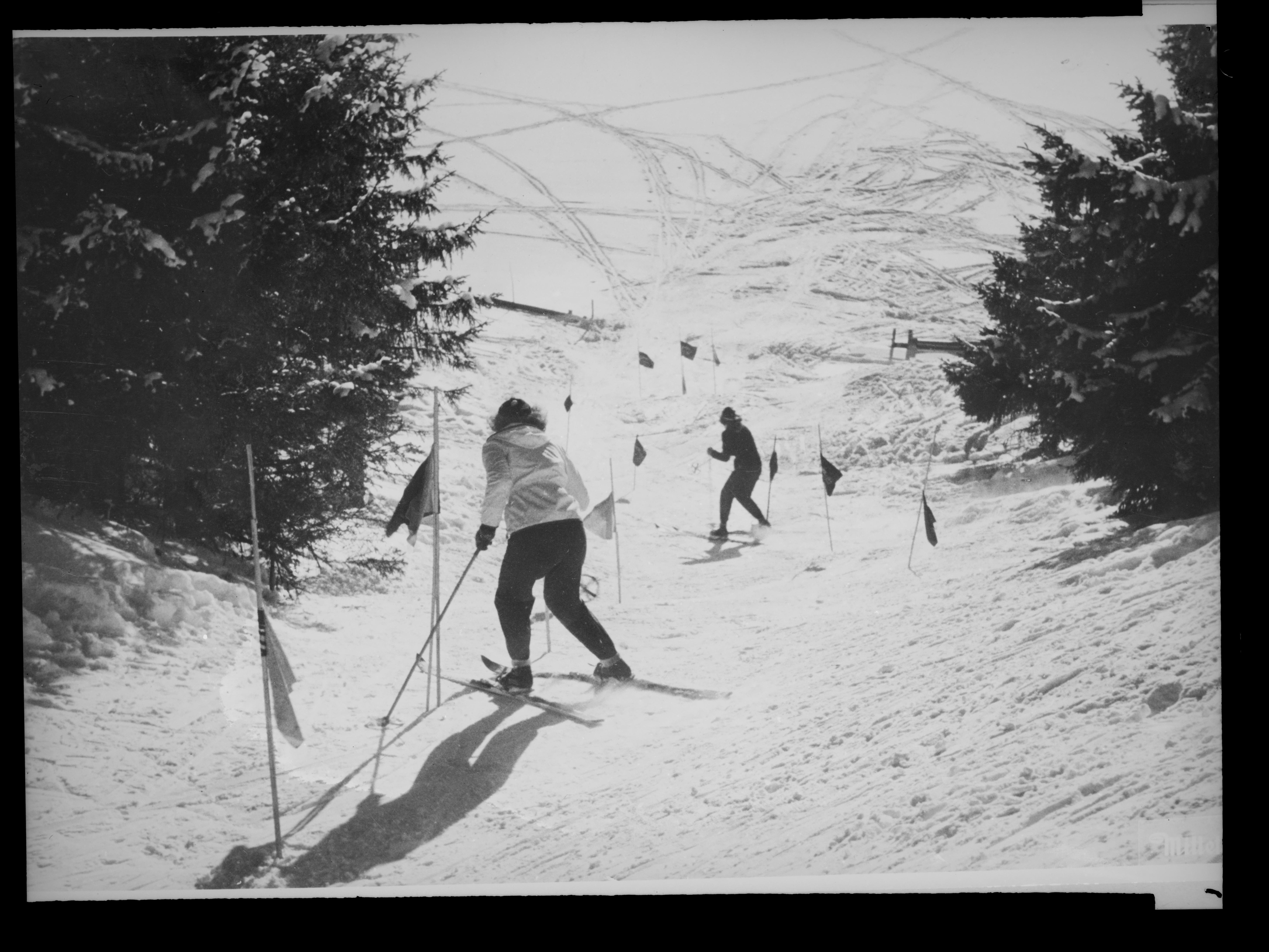
Skiers employing the stem christie through slalom gates.

The stem christie, also known as the wedge christie, is a type of skiing turn that originated in the mid-1800s in Norway and fell out of common use by the late 1960s. It comprises three steps: 1) forming a wedge by rotating the tail of one ski outwards at an angle to the direction of movement, initiating a change in direction opposite to the stemmed ski, 2) bringing the other ski parallel to the wedged ski, and 3) completing the turn with both skis parallel as they carve an arc, sliding sideways together.

== History ==
The stem Christiana was developed by Sondre Norheim in the mid-1800s. Norheim was a Norwegian skier and inventor whose innovations included early ski heel bindings that facilitated turning and jumping, and method for turning that included the basic stem, the Christiana, stem Christiana and parallel turns. The term derives from turns employed by Norwegian jumpers in Oslo, Norway—then called "Christiania"—which was later shortened to "christie".

This specific type of turn was promoted in the first decade of the 1900s by Austrian ski guide Hannes Schneider as the mainstay of the Arlberg technique, which he called the "Alpine System". Schneider's name is so attached to the turn that he is sometimes identified as its inventor, but he used it to replace the Telemark turn as the standard for descending on skis.

The technique was widely used until the late 1960s, when its use diminished in favor of the parallel turn, another form of turning on skis introduced by Norheim, alongside new ideas for sidecuts (to what had earlier been parallel inside and outside ski edges). Skis with increasingly parabolic sidecuts accelerated the obsolescence of the stem christie, starting in the late 1990s, because of their improved turning characteristics over skis with minimal sidecut.

== See also ==
- Snowplough turn - also known as the wedge turn or stem turn
- Parallel turn
- Skiing Topics
