= Arlberg technique =

Method of snow skiing instruction

The Arlberg technique is a structured teaching system for skiing that guides beginners from the basic snowplough turn – where skis form a wedge to control speed and direction – to the parallel stem christie, a turn blending a slight wedge with parallel skiing, through a series of progressive steps. Developed by Hannes Schneider in the Arlberg mountains of Austria, it emphasizes control and stability using deliberate body movements like stemming (pushing one ski outward).

Introduced in the early 20th century, the system, or its adapted versions, is still taught in some ski schools today, though its focus on stemming and the stem christie reflects techniques prominent before the 1960s. By contrast, modern ski equipment supports carving, where skiers tilt edged skis to arc smoothly without skidding, relying on design rather than stemming. Some schools now bypass stemming entirely, moving students from snowplough to carving to avoid difficult to unlearn habits tied to older methods.

Schneider’s approach gained fame in Europe through films in the 1920s and 30s and spread to the United States after he emigrated there in 1939, following imprisonment during the Anschluss.

== History ==
Hannes Schneider took a job as a ski instructor at the Hotel Post in Sankt Anton am Arlberg in Austria in 1907. He started developing various modifications to current ski techniques during this time, and the Arlberg technique developed through this process. During World War I he used the technique to train the Austria's alpine troops, and fought with the Austrian army in Russia and on the Italian front. With the ending of the war, he returned to Hotel Post and continued to develop the Arlberg technique.

Poster for Das Wunder des Schneeschuhs (1920)

In 1920 the German filmmaker Arnold Fanck visited Arlberg and produced an early instructional ski film, Das Wunder des Schneeschuhs. This introduced the Arlberg technique to the world, and it was quickly taken up by ski schools. A follow-up film in 1931, The White Ecstasy, followed the tribulations of two friends who travel to Arlberg to learn how to ski. This film was produced along with an instructional book, which was featured in the film. Stills from the film were also used to illustrate the book.

By 1925 Schneider's technique had become known as the "Arlberg Technique". He trained Otto Schneibs and Hannes Schroll to become emissaries to the United States for the now-certified technique, as described in Schneib's book, Modern Ski Technique. The book and technique helped underpin the success of the Dartmouth College ski team, where Schneibs was a ski coach.

Schneider travelled to the United States in 1936 to demonstrate his techniques at a winter sports show in the Boston Garden. The demonstrations were held on a wooden slide that was covered with shaved ice. He repeated these demonstrations Madison Square Garden two weeks later. The techniques were soon taken up by US instructors.

Schneider was jailed during the Anschluss, but his US contacts led to his freedom. These efforts were led by Harvey Dow Gibson, president of the Manufacturer's Trust. Gibson had started the Cranmore Mountain Resort, a ski resort in his home town of North Conway, New Hampshire. Carol Reed ran a ski school in the town (at the time, schools and rentals were often 3rd party services, as opposed to being owned by the resort itself) and had hired one of Schneider's students to run it, Benno Rybizka.

Gibson bought the school from Reed, moving Reed to a newly formed Saks Fifth Avenue Ski Shop. He then wrote to the German Minister of Finance, Hjalmar Schacht, requesting that Schneider be freed to take the now-vacant lead instructor position. Schacht agreed, and Schneider arrived in the US in 1939. He continued to teach the Arlberg technique personally, while also introducing it at schools across the country.

== Basic concepts ==
Downhill skiing focusses much of its attention on the development of skier techniques for smoothly turning the skis. This is used both for directional control as well as the primary method for controlling speed. When the skier is pointed down the hill, or "along the fall line", they will accelerate. If the same skier points the skis across the fall line, or more radically, uphill, speed will be reduced. Using turns, the skier can control the amount of time the skis are pointed down the fall line, and thereby control their speed.

Early downhill techniques were based on two techniques, the telemark style or stemming. Over time, the latter became much more popular, and the more athletic telemark has remained a niche technique since the 1900s. Stemming is based on creating turning forces by skidding the edge of the ski over the snow at an angle to the forward movement of the skier. The angle between the ski and the motion over the snow creates sideways forces that cause the skier to turn. In general, the skier angles the ski by keeping the tip roughly in-line with their shoulders, while pushing the tail of the ski out and to the side. The various styles of stemming turns differ primarily in form:

- The snowplough places both skis at roughly the same angle throughout a ski run, moving the ski on the inside of the desired turn toward the body.
- The stem or stem Christie turn is similar, but the skis are kept parallel when they are not being turned, and the ski on the outside of the turn is pushed away from the body to initiate the turn (stemming). This is sometimes known as the "wedge Christie".
- Further refinement of the basic Christie turn continues through development of "weighting", moving the skis into the turn by moving weight from one ski to the other, as opposed to pushing the skis directly.

The Arlberg technique is based on the similarly of these concepts, introducing each stage as a series of modifications on the previous concepts. The snowplough is typically introduced to beginners by having them move their legs to produce a "pizza slice" shape, tips together and tails apart. Speed along the fall line can be controlled by adjusting the angle of the slice; with the tails far apart more drag is created, slowing the skier. Turns are accomplished through brute force, having the skier rotate the ski on the inside of the turn so it moves inward through sideways pressure from the leg and rotation of the foot.

As the skier gains confidence and can increase their speed, the angle of the snowplough is reduced until it devolves into the skis lying parallel to each other. At this point turning is initiated not by moving the inside ski toward the body, but moving the outside ski outward. This is the classic "stemming" motion, developing directly from the snowplough. Christy turning is essentially a technique for easily stemming, an active method that involves motion of the upper body, hips and knees.

== Later developments ==
The Arlberg technique remained essentially unchanged into the 1960s. This was due largely to the limitations of the equipment of the era. Ski boots were stiff only in the sole, and offered little or no support laterally above the ski – moving the legs to the side would simply cause the upper portion of the boot to bend, it would not transmit this force to the ski. The only forces that could be transmitted were those that were parallel to the top of the ski (or more specifically, the bottom of the boot), namely rotating the toe in or out, or pushing the entire foot to one side or the other. As the ski can only be pushed inward until it meets the other ski, most of the control movements were accomplished by pushing the skis outward to the sides – the stemming motion.

During the 1950s and 60s, several developments in downhill ski equipment dramatically changed the sport. These changes were first introduced by the Head Standard ski, the Look Nevada ski binding, and the Lange and Rosemount plastic ski boots. Each of these further, and dramatically, improved the ability to transmit rotational forces to the ski, and from the ski to the snow. This allowed the ski to be turned by directly rotating it onto its edge, exposing the curved sidecut to the snow, bending the ski into an arc, and causing it to naturally turn along that arced path. The parallel turn developed from what was essentially a weight-balanced version of the stem Christy into a much less athletic version, today known as carving.

Early versions of the parallel turn can be taught as modifications of the stem Christy, and this became a popular addition to the Arlberg technique through the 1960s and especially in the 1970s. By the late 1970s, the upper echelon of ski technique was based on a series of short, rapid parallel turns with the upper body remaining aligned down the fall line as long as possible, similar to modern mogul skiing technique. Turn initiation was based on weighting and rotating the ski, like carving, but the power of the turn remained in the skidding. However, as equipment continued to improve, especially the introduction of the "parabolic" skis in the 1990s (today known as "shaped"), the ratio of skidding to carving continued to change, and techniques along with it. Modern technique is based largely on carving, adding skidding only as needed to tighten the turn.

Modern skis make carving turns so simple that the Arlberg technique of gradual progression is no longer universal. Many ski schools graduate advancing students directly from the snowplough to the carving turn. These are taught as two entirely separate techniques, one using stemming and the other using the movement of the knees, so the progressive connection emphasized in the Arlberg technique is no longer maintained. This is by no means universal, and many schools continue to follow the classic Arlberg progression.
