= History of Oslo's name =

The Norwegian city of Oslo was founded in the year 1040 under the name Ánslo. After being destroyed by a fire in 1624, during the reign of King Christian IV, a new city was built closer to Akershus Fortress and named Christiania in the king's honour. From 1877, the city's name was spelled Kristiania in government usage, a spelling that was adopted by the municipal authorities only in 1897. In 1925 the city, after incorporating the village retaining its former name, was renamed Oslo.

== The name Oslo ==
According to folk etymology, Oslo meant "the mouth of the Lo river", referring to a lost name of the river Alna. This is not only ungrammatical (the correct form would be Loaros, cf. Nidaros), but the name Lo is not recorded anywhere before Peder Claussøn Friis first used it in the same work in which he proposed this etymology. The name Lo is now believed to be a back-formation arrived at by Friis in support of his spurious etymology for Oslo. In reality, however, ló meant "clearing" or "meadow", and is cognate to lo(o), loh and leigh in other Germanic languages.

During the Middle Ages the name was initially spelt "Ánslo" or "Áslo" and later "Óslo" or "Opslo". The earlier spelling suggests that the first component ás might refer to the Ekeberg ridge southeast of the medieval town. The word ás (in modern Norwegian ås) with the meaning 'ridge' or 'hill' is a common component in Norwegian place names (as in Ås and Åsnes). In that case, it would read "the meadow beneath the ridge".

Another interpretation could be "the meadow of the gods" (the word áss or ansu in Old Norse refers to the Æsir). The word ás with the meaning "god" is rare in place names, and Bull concludes that the name most likely has a topographical origin.

== Christiania (1624–1924) ==
A fire in 1624 destroyed much of the medieval city, and when the city was rebuilt it was moved westwards to be closer to Akershus Fortress. King Christian IV of Denmark and Norway named the reborn city Christiania. The old site east of Aker river was not abandoned however and the village of Oslo remained as suburb outside the city gates. According to an official spelling reform (that changed ch to k) the form was changed to Kristiania in 1877. (The same year the city names Christiansand and Christiansund were changed to Kristiansand and Kristiansund and the name of the county Christians Amt was changed to Kristians Amt.) The new form was used in all official documents and publications of the Norwegian State, but not by the municipality itself. The city continued to use the old form until 1897, then they also changed to Kristiania (without any formal or official decision).

== Change from "Kristiania" to "Oslo" ==
After the 1624 establishment of Christiania near Akershus fortress, the original site of the town was rebuilt and served as suburb outside the city gates. This village east of the river had preserved the name "Oslo". A 1783 map, the oldest existing of the city, uses "Christiania" for the new town west of the river, while "Opslo" is used for the easternmost settlement near Ekeberg hill. A map published in 1827 also indicates "Opslo" as the village or suburb outside the city proper. A map published by Aftenposten in 1923 labels the eastern suburb as "Oslo" and the nearby port as "Oslo harbour". After the 1859 and 1878 expansion of city borders to include the surrounding Aker municipality, the village of Oslo was included in Christiania municipality. The entire city was named "Oslo" by a law of 11 July 1924, effective 1 January 1925—a decision that caused much debate. The change was proposed in 1918 by 29 civil servants. Morgenbladet compiled a list of 28,000 signatures against the proposal. Sigrid Undset wrote that she would be ashamed if the city would try to cheat and pretend to be its predecessor on the other side of the Aker river.

When the city in general now took up the name of Oslo, the eastern district of the city that had preserved the name became known simply as Gamlebyen "the Old Town of Oslo" in the borough (district) of Gamle Oslo "Old Oslo". The old square of Christian IV's city was named Christiania torv in 1958, and this name (with the old ch-form) is still in use on signs and maps. Christian IV's city with straight streets and right angles is now known as Kvadraturen ("the Square") and covers large parts of modern Oslo's centre, in 2009 it was proposed to rename this area Christiania.

A street in Gamlebyen was named "Oslo gate" ('Oslo street') when the name Oslo still was the name of a suburb in Kristiania. The street name is still in use. "Oslo torg" (Oslo market square) is the old name for the centre of old Oslo at the intersection of Bispegata and Oslo gate, and was reintroduced by the city council in 2014.

== Nickname ==
The city was referred to as Tigerstaden (the City of Tigers) by the author Bjørnstjerne Bjørnson around 1870, due to his perception of the city as a cold and dangerous place. This name has over the years achieved an almost official status, to the extent that the 1000-year anniversary was celebrated by a row of tiger sculptures around city hall. The prevalence of homeless and other beggars in more recent times led to the slight rewording of the nickname into Tiggerstaden (the City of Beggars).
