= Hannes Schneider =

Austrian ski instructor

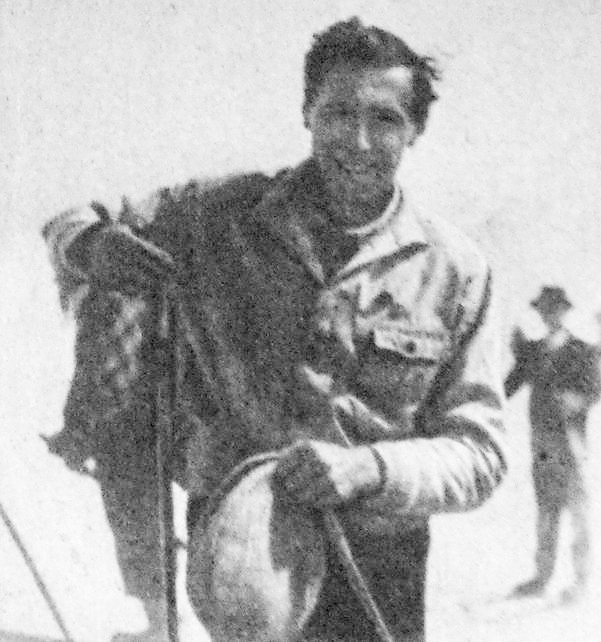
- Hannes Schneider in Japan in 1930
- Born: Johann Schneider; June 24, 1890; Stuben am Arlberg, Austria
- Died: April 26, 1955 (aged 64); North Conway, New Hampshire, United States
- Occupation: Ski school instructor/director
- Known for: Arlberg Technique, St. Anton ski school
- Awards: Inducted U.S. Ski Hall of Fame (1958)

Johann "Hannes" Schneider (24 June 1890 – 26 April 1955) was an Austrian ski instructor of the first half of the 20th century, famous for pioneering the Arlberg technique of instruction. Many consider him the Father of Modern Day Skiing. A statue of him in North Conway, New Hampshire, states the very same claim.

== Biography ==
Schneider was born in the town of Stuben am Arlberg in Austria, the son of a farmer who also kept a few cows that provided fresh milk for local cheesemakers. His father was also a road supervisor tasked with keeping the crucial Arlberg Pass open during the winter months. It was his father's hope that Hannes would become a cheesemaker.

Hannes first observed skiing in 1893 when Viktor Sohm visited the town of Stuben. Legend has it that Schneider made his first pair of skis from an old barrel; in reality, he took measurements of Sohm's skis and had a local barrel maker craft him a pair. Sohm took Schneider under his wing during his winter visits to the Arlberg region. Schneider became more proficient on his skis and soon gained a reputation for his skills, winning many local races.

In 1907, he was offered a spot as an apprentice cheesemaker, much to the delight of his parents. However, an offer to teach skiing at a hotel in Les Avants, Switzerland opened his family's eyes to the possibility that one could make a living skiing. At the time the hotel had a vibrant summer business but few visitors in the winter.

Word of the offer spread throughout the towns of the region and he was offered a similar arrangement at the Hotel Post in St Anton am Arlberg. Karl Schuler, owner of the Hotel Post, knew this was an opportunity to position St Anton as a major ski resort for the growing sport.

While at St Anton, Schneider developed the basics of ski instruction known as the "Hannes Schneider Arlberg Ski Technique and Method of Teaching", or simply the Arlberg technique. This technique is still used today as a foundation for teaching alpine skiing. Many of the early pioneers of alpine skiing passed through Schneider's school as instructors, including Luggi Foeger, Rudi Matt, Benno Rybizka, and Otto Lang, who went on to open Hannes Schneider ski schools in the United States at Mount Rainier, Mount Hood, and Mount Baker and ran the Sun Valley Ski School for many years.

Schneider was drafted into the Austrian Army in 1908, but was reassigned to the reserves after a few months. The town fathers of St Anton claimed that his ski school had become crucial in the Arlberg region. Schneider did serve as a ski instructor for the Austrian Army during the First World War, after which he returned to the Hotel Post. In 1920, he appeared in a documentary film based on the Arlberg technique, and formed a semi-independent ski school where by 1924 he had formalized his method of instruction. In 1928, he helped organize the international Arlberg-Kandahar alpine race at St. Anton.

In the interwar period he also appeared in several more of Dr. Arnold Fanck's ski films. The White Ecstasy, which helped make skiing widely popular, was filmed at the Arlberg in the winter of 1930–1931. Schneider also co-wrote a best-selling instructional book with Fanck, named Die Wunder des Schneeschuhs, which was translated into English as The Wonders of Skiing in 1931. Former students of Hannes Schneider include Otto Lang, Friedl Pfeifer, and Toni Matt.

In the events leading up to World War II, Germany and the Third Reich took control of Austria in 1938. Schneider (who was an outspoken critic of the Nazis), was stripped of his ski school and imprisoned. In 1939 the President of Manufacturers Trust Company (Harvey Dow Gibson), negotiated the exoneration of Schneider and brought him to the US to re-open his ski school at his Cranmore Mountain in North Conway, New Hampshire. Schneider, recognized as the father of skiing, ran the ski school and the resort until his death in 1955. During the Second World War, he helped train the 10th Mountain Division of the U.S. Army, in which his son Herbert served.

Hannes Schneider died in New Hampshire in 1955, at the age of 64.

== Legacy ==
Hannes was posthumously inducted into the U.S. Ski Hall of Fame in 1958. The New England Ski Museum hosts the Hannes Schneider Meister Skiing Cup in his memory every March at Cranmore Mountain Resort. In 2005, the New England Ski Museum featured an exhibit on the life of Hannes Schneider and his impact on the sport of skiing.

== Selected filmography ==
- Das Wunder des Schneeschuhs (1920)
- Im Kampf mit dem Berge (1921)
- Mountain of Destiny (1924)
- The Holy Mountain (1926)
- Hannes Schneider (1926) short film
- Struggle for the Matterhorn (1928)
- The White Ecstasy (1931)
- The Scoundrel (1939)
