= St. Anton am Arlberg =

Municipality in Tyrol, Austria

Sankt Anton am Arlberg
- Municipality
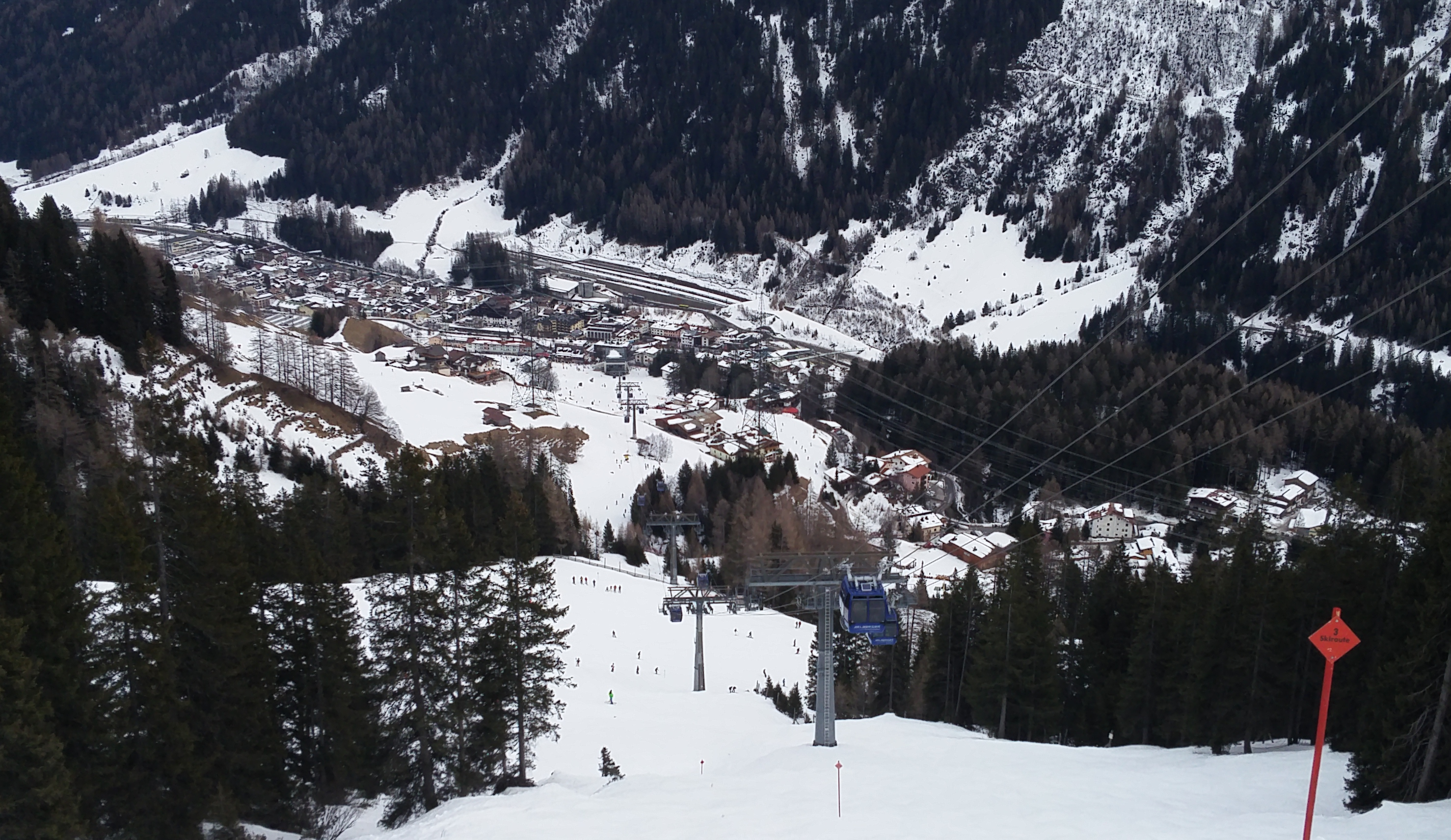
- Sankt Anton am Arlberg in February 2016

- Coat of arms

- Location within Austria St. Anton (Austria)
- Coordinates: 47°07′N 10°16′E
- Country: Austria
- State: Tyrol
- District: Landeck

Government
  - Mayor: Helmut Mall (ÖVP)

Area
  - Total: 165.81 km^{2} (64.02 sq mi)
- Elevation: 1,304 m (4,278 ft)

Population (2021)
  - Total: 2,357
  - Density: 14.22/km^{2} (36.82/sq mi)
- Time zone: UTC+1 (CET)
  - Summer (DST): UTC+2 (CEST)
- Postal code: 6580
- Area code: 05446
- Vehicle registration: LA
- Website: www.st-anton.at

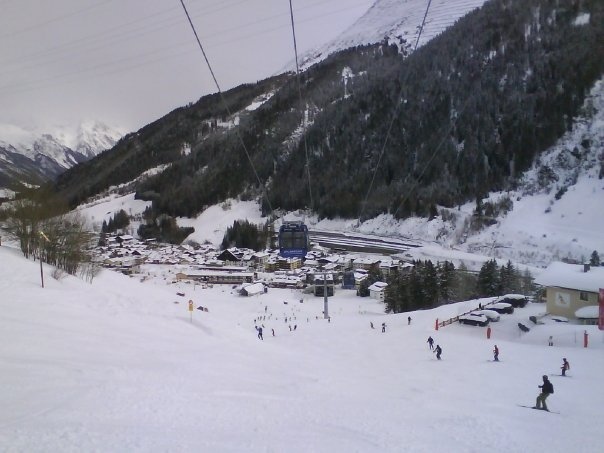
St. Anton seen from the main piste into the centre of town

Sankt Anton am Arlberg, commonly referred to as St. Anton, is a village and ski resort in the Austrian state of Tyrol. It lies in the Tyrolean Alps, with aerial tramways and chairlifts up to 2,811 m (9,222 ft), yielding a vertical drop of 1,507 m (4,944 ft). It is also a popular summer resort among trekkers and mountaineers.

Skiing has a long history in St. Anton: ski instructors from the area emigrated to the United States in the 1930s, helping to popularise the sport. St. Anton was the host of the Alpine World Ski Championships in 2001, and is frequently listed as one of the world's top skiing resorts both in terms of skiing available and après-ski entertainment.

== Geography ==
St. Anton lies on the Rosanna River.

== Activities ==
=== Skiing ===
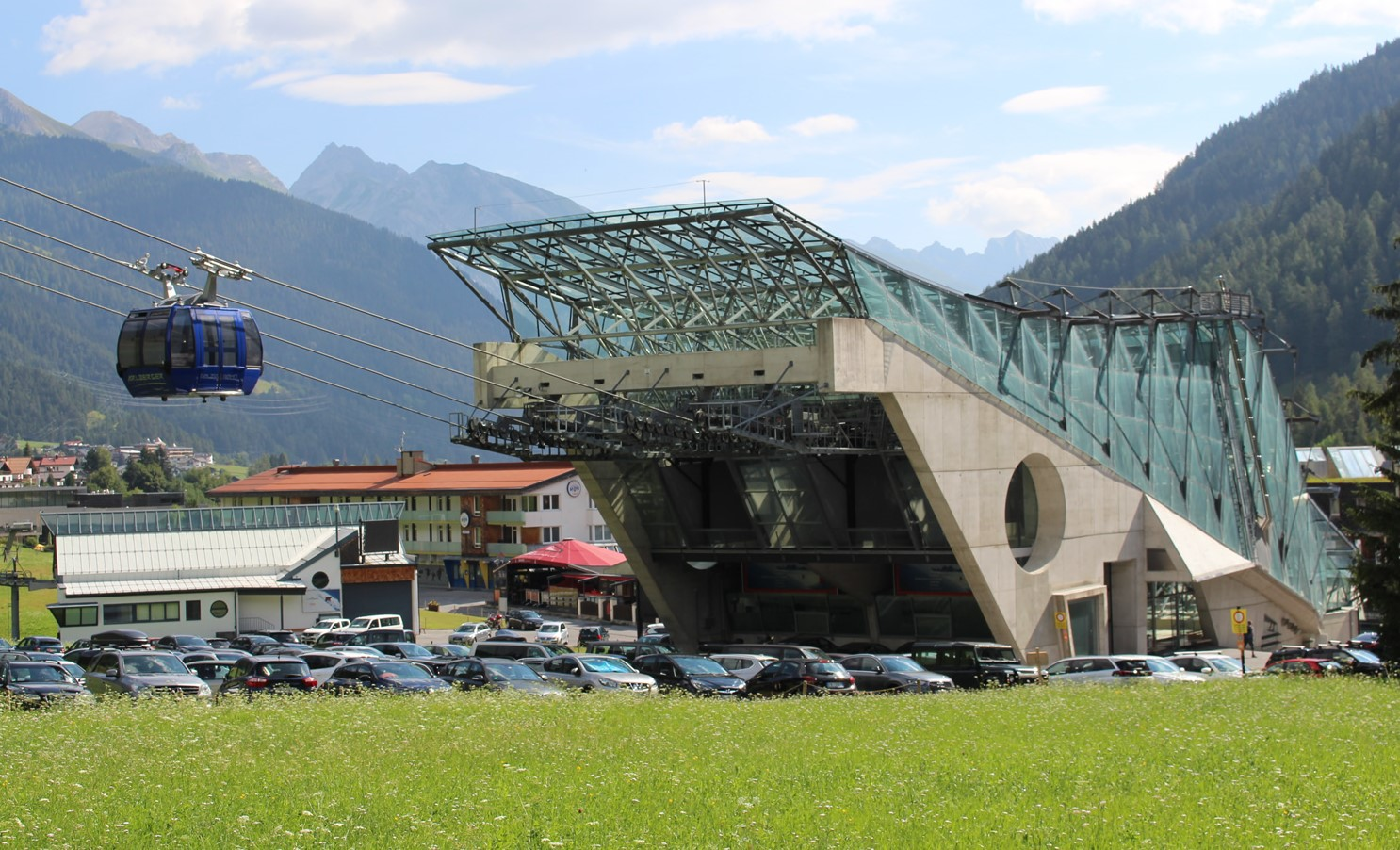

St. Anton is part of the Arlberg area of ski resorts – a region that includes 94 cable cars and ski lifts, 340 km (210 mi) of groomed pistes and 200 km (120 mi) of deep-snow runs, all of which are covered under one liftpass.

On the western edge of village is the "Galzigbahn" which has been replaced by a Funitel gondola. The new gondola includes a first-ever "Ferris wheel": enabling passengers to board the gondolas on ground level, then rotating the gondolas up to the main high-speed cables. The Funitel accesses the Galzig slopes and connects to Schindler and Valluga peaks. On the eastern edge of town, the Nassereinbahn rises to the Nasserein area with connections to the Kapall peak. The Kapall, Valluga, and Schindler peaks provide skiers with close to 1,500 vertical metres skiing (4,920 ft). Slope-side après-ski bars can be found on the Steissbachtal trail just above St. Anton.

The groomed runs in the region cater to all levels; 43% are for beginners (blue), 41% for intermediate skiers (red) and 16% are for the more advanced (black). There are also 200 km (120 mi) of deep snow runs in the area.

Expert terrain includes less-frequently groomed ski routes such as Schindlerkar and Mattun, and the backside of Valluga (2,811 metres or 9,222 feet) down to Zürs, which is for experts only if accompanied by a guide. There are also a large number of off-piste routes in the area that experts can explore with the help of a guide.

Other ski areas are St Christoph am Arlberg, a hamlet where in the 14th century the shepherd Heinrich Findelkind built a hospice as a shelter for travellers crossing the Arlberg pass to the Vorarlberg province, Stuben, Lech, Zürs, Warth-Schröcken, and Klösterle/Sonnenkopf.

== Transportation ==
=== Road ===
St. Anton is easily reached by car on the A14 motorway, which runs from Vorarlberg (Austria's westernmost state, which borders Liechtenstein and Switzerland) and then follows the spine of the Tyrol.

Alternatively, St. Anton, Langen am Arlberg, and Kloesterle (all located in the Arlberg ski region) have railway stations. Both St. Anton and Langen am Arlberg are stops on international train services between Zurich and Budapest.

St. Anton and the surrounding villages/resorts are served by a network of bus routes. In the town itself, there are two hubs known as the "Terminal Ost" and the "Terminal West". "Terminal Ost" gives access to the Nassereinbahn Gondola and the "Terminal West" to the Galzigbahn/Rendlbahn gondolas as well as the town's railway station.

There is a route with frequent, year-round services between St. Anton and Landeck, the latter being a town located at the entrance to the main valley (Stanzertal, as it is known in the local area). Frequent free bus services also operate between different parts of St. Anton as well as from Pettneu, Schnann, and Flirsch.

=== Rail ===
St. Anton am Arlberg is a railway station on the Arlberg railway line between Bludenz and Innsbruck Hauptbahnhof. The station is served by Railjet, EuroCity, InterCity, EuroNight, and NightJet trains of ÖBB and services of Westbahn.

== Climate ==
Climate data for St. Anton am Arlberg (1971–2000)
Month	Jan	Feb	Mar	Apr	May	Jun	Jul	Aug	Sep	Oct	Nov	Dec	Year
Record high °C (°F)	11.5 (52.7)	15.0 (59.0)	20.5 (68.9)	23.0 (73.4)	27.6 (81.7)	29.2 (84.6)	33.2 (91.8)	32.4 (90.3)	28.0 (82.4)	25.0 (77.0)	20.0 (68.0)	14.0 (57.2)	33.2 (91.8)
Mean daily maximum °C (°F)	1.0 (33.8)	3.1 (37.6)	6.4 (43.5)	9.7 (49.5)	15.4 (59.7)	18.1 (64.6)	20.9 (69.6)	20.6 (69.1)	17.4 (63.3)	12.7 (54.9)	5.3 (41.5)	0.9 (33.6)	11.0 (51.8)
Daily mean °C (°F)	−4.9 (23.2)	−3.7 (25.3)	−0.1 (31.8)	3.5 (38.3)	8.8 (47.8)	11.7 (53.1)	14.1 (57.4)	13.5 (56.3)	10.1 (50.2)	5.3 (41.5)	−0.8 (30.6)	−4.0 (24.8)	4.5 (40.1)
Mean daily minimum °C (°F)	−8.8 (16.2)	−8.1 (17.4)	−4.4 (24.1)	−1.0 (30.2)	3.3 (37.9)	6.2 (43.2)	8.5 (47.3)	8.3 (46.9)	5.3 (41.5)	0.9 (33.6)	−4.4 (24.1)	−7.6 (18.3)	−0.2 (31.6)
Record low °C (°F)	−27.4 (−17.3)	−23.6 (−10.5)	−23.0 (−9.4)	−12.0 (10.4)	−8.6 (16.5)	−2.4 (27.7)	−1.5 (29.3)	0.0 (32.0)	−5.0 (23.0)	−14.2 (6.4)	−19.9 (−3.8)	−24.0 (−11.2)	−27.4 (−17.3)
Average precipitation mm (inches)	105.5 (4.15)	93.3 (3.67)	92.3 (3.63)	63.5 (2.50)	86.3 (3.40)	133.8 (5.27)	162.0 (6.38)	162.1 (6.38)	95.9 (3.78)	74.1 (2.92)	101.4 (3.99)	105.0 (4.13)	1,275.2 (50.20)
Average snowfall cm (inches)	71.1 (28.0)	73.3 (28.9)	59.7 (23.5)	24.6 (9.7)	3.6 (1.4)	0.0 (0.0)	0.0 (0.0)	0.0 (0.0)	0.0 (0.0)	5.7 (2.2)	33.1 (13.0)	57.7 (22.7)	328.8 (129.4)
Average precipitation days (≥ 1.0 mm)	10.8	9.1	11.7	10.8	12.5	15.6	15.7	15.2	11.6	9.2	11.0	11.5	144.7
Average relative humidity (%) (at 14:00)	67.1	57.5	50.3	48.2	46.4	50.0	48.8	50.9	50.1	52.4	62.2	71.0	54.6
Source: Central Institute for Meteorology and Geodynamics

== In popular culture ==
St. Anton was the setting for the film The White Ecstasy, starring Leni Riefenstahl and local ski instructor Hannes Schneider. Made in 1931, the comedy film was a fictional account of the skiing exploits of a young village girl, played by Riefenstahl, and her attempts to master the sport of skiing and ski-jumping aided by the local ski expert Hannes Schneider. The film was one of the first to use and develop outdoor film-making techniques and featured several innovative action-skiing scenes. Riefenstahl went on to make Nazi propaganda films and, post-war, subsequently lived in Africa. After the war, Schneider developed the downhill skiing method known as the "Arlberg technique".

St. Anton was shown in the 1969 film Downhill Racer, starring Robert Redford and Gene Hackman.

The resort was featured extensively in the 2011 film Chalet Girl, a romantic comedy starring Felicity Jones, Ed Westwick and Bill Nighy. The resort of Garmisch-Partenkirchen in Germany was also used for some interior shots.

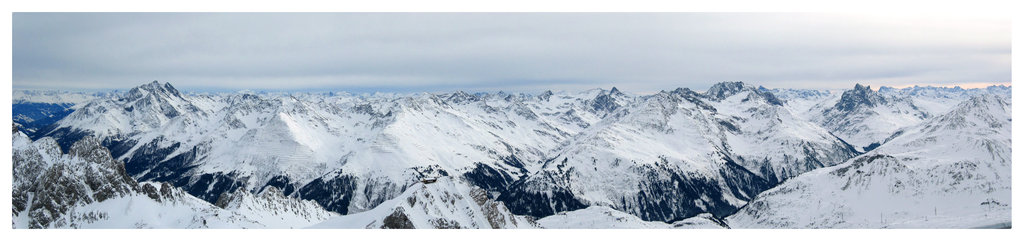
Panorama Arlberg

== Statistics ==
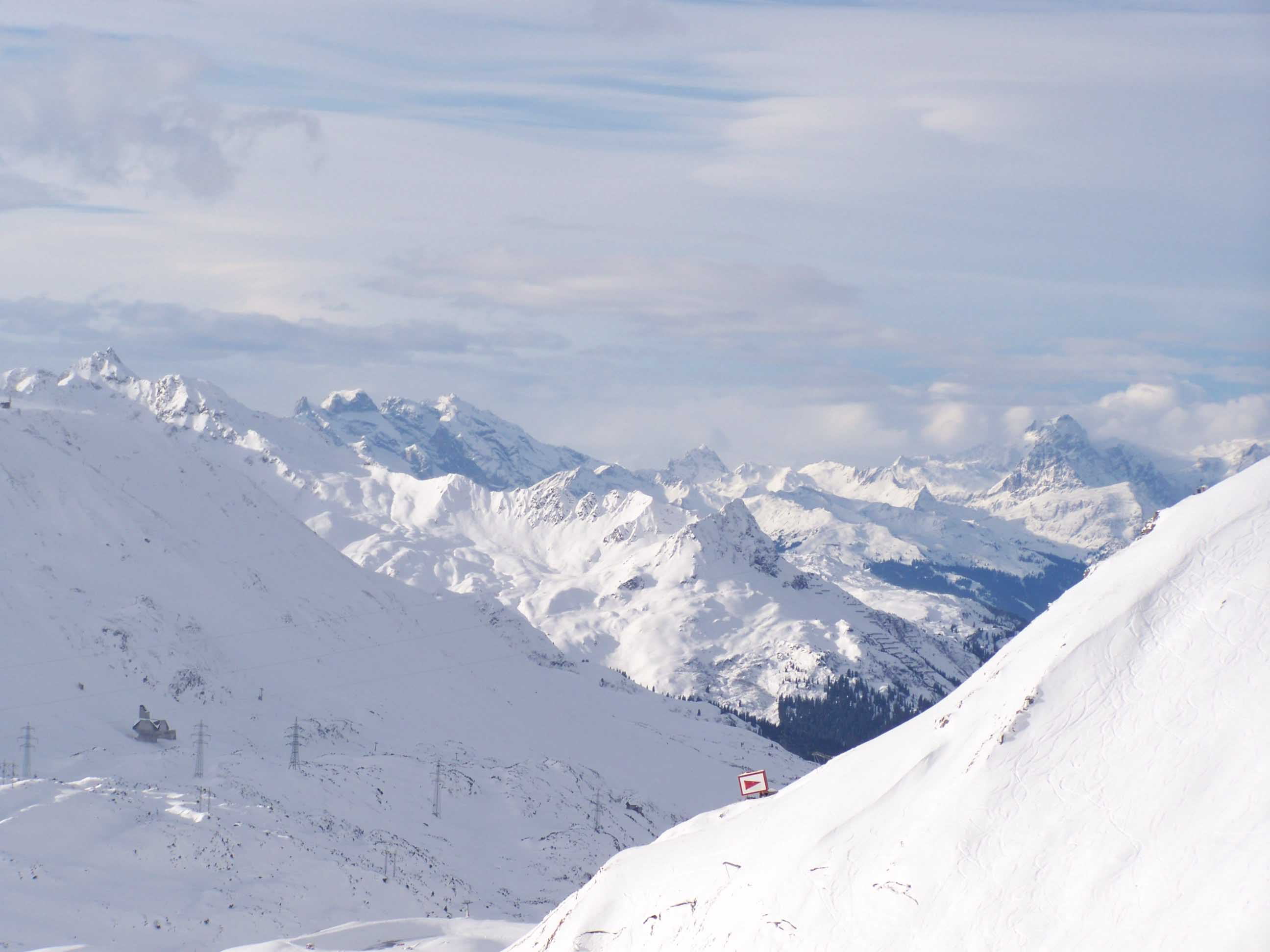
The view over the Galzig as seen from the Kapall

- Elevation: village: 1,304 m (4,278 ft); top: 2,811 m (9,222 ft)
- Vertical: 1,507 m (4,944 ft)
- Longest run: 10.2 km (6.3 mi), Valluga to St. Anton
- Lifts: 94 (Ski*Arlberg); 11 gondolas; 51 chairlifts (one 10-passenger, one 8-passenger, fifteen 6-passenger, 15 quads, 1 triples, 18 doubles); 32 T-bars lifts
- Lift capacity: 151,010 per hour
- Ski season: early December to late April
- Cross country: 41 km (25 mi) total: Stanzertal 22 km (14 mi), Verwall 10 km (6 mi), St Christoph 2.5 km (1.6 mi), Ganderau 3 km (1.9 mi), Reit 2 km (1.2 mi), Pofel 15 km (9.3 mi)
- Mountain restaurants: 18
- Après-ski: ski museum; 15 cafés, 8 ice bars, 3 discos, 7 bars
- Lodging: 8,900 beds; hotels, gasthof, apartments, private pensions in St. Anton, St Jakob, and St Christoph
