= Parallel turn =

Alpine skiing technique

The parallel turn in alpine skiing is a method for turning which rolls the ski onto one edge, allowing it to bend into an arc. Thus bent, the ski follows the turn without sliding. It contrasts with earlier techniques such as the stem Christie, which slides the ski outward from the body ("stemming") to generate sideways force. Parallel turns generate much less friction and are more efficient both in maintaining speed and minimizing skier effort.

The parallel turn was invented in the 1930s by Austrian ski racer Anton Seelos from Seefeld in Tirol.

Parallel turns require solid contact from the skier's lower leg to the ski to rotate it on-edge. This was difficult to achieve with early ski equipment, limiting the technique to the high performance realm of racing. The introduction of composite skis, metal edges, releasable clamping bindings, and stiff plastic boots combined to allow parallel turns even on beginner equipment. By the late 1960s it rapidly replaced stemming for all but very short-radius turns. The evolution of shaped skis in the 1990s advanced the carving turn to preeminence.

Today parallel turns are taught to teach novice skiers the effect of weighting and unweighting their skis. They are still the basic technique for steep hills, off piste and mogul skiing.

== Basic action ==
The parallel turn relies on two dynamics: releasing the edge hold by reducing the angle between ski and snow surface which makes the front of the ski skid downhill (skidding inwards) and then applying a force to change the edge and make the ski turn across the line of greatest slope (skidding outwards).

The skier initiates the turn by moving their knees or the whole body laterally in the direction of the desired turn. The motion of knees is translated through the calf to the high cuffs on the ski boots, to the bindings, and then to the skis. This reduces the edge hold and causes the skis to rotate on their edges, with the skier's weight and the force they put upon them to change the edge of the skis which turns them across the line of greatest slope. To stop the turn the knee or the body is rotated back to the neutral position until the edge holds and the skidding stops. While both skis take part, in practice the ski on the outside of the turn is dominant.

Moving the legs to the side shifts the center of gravity, compensated for by moving the hips in the opposite direction. The effect is to keep the skier's upper body upright while the lower torso and legs shift side-to-side. The skier pressures the front of their skis to keep the fore-and-aft center of gravity of the skier's mass over their toes.

The parallel turn can be improved through dynamic "weighting". Turns are often linked in a series of continual arcs, one direction then the other. Lifting the body through the middle of the switch partially releases the skis arcs, easing the transition to the opposite direction.

== Changing the technique ==
In the 1990s skis were progressively widened at the tips and tails relative to the waist. Applying an edge of these "shaped" or "parabolic" skis brings a curved surface to the snow, resulting in a carve turn.
