= Belomorsky =

Belomorsky (masculine), Belomorskaya (feminine), or Belomorskoye (neuter) may refer to:

- Belomorsky District, a district of the Republic of Karelia, Russia
- Belomorskaya, a station of the Zamoskvoretskaya Line of the Moscow Metro, Moscow, Russia
- Belomorskoye Urban Settlement, a municipal formation incorporating the town of Belomorsk and eleven rural localities in Belomorsky District of the Republic of Karelia, Russia
- Belomorskoye (rural locality), a rural locality (a settlement) in Kaliningrad Oblast, Russia

== See also ==
- Belomorsk
