= Nikolai Mefodiev =

Nikolai Mefodiev Russian: Николай Мефодиев
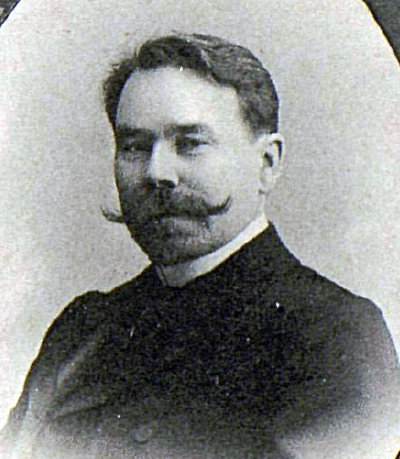
- photo of 1910

Deputy of the Third Imperial Duma
- In office 1 November 1907 – 9 June 1912
- Monarch: Nicholas II

Personal details
- Born: Nikolai Vladimirovich Mefodiev; 1869 Tunguda, Arkhangelsk Governorate, Russian Empire
- Died: after 1927
- Party: Constitutional Democratic Party

Nikolai Vladimirovich Mefodiev (Russian: Никола́й Влади́мирович Мефо́диев; 1869, Tunguda, Arkhangelsk Governorate — after 1927) was a medical doctor, village teacher and deputy of the Third Imperial Duma from the Arkhangelsk Governorate between 1907 and 1912. After the end of the deputy term, he continued publishing a newspaper — a business that he had started back in 1909. After the February Revolution he sent a greeting to the Duma; after the October Revolution he returned to medical practice. In 1918, he joined the anti-Bolshevik administration of the Northern Oblast (chaired by Nikolai Tchaikovsky). March 24, 1920 Mefodiev was arrested by the bolshevik government and sentenced to two years of penal labour. In June 1927, he was arrested again and exiled to Siberia, where all his tracks were lost.

== Literature ==
- Мефодиев Николай Владимирович (in Russian) // Государственная дума Российской империи: 1906—1917 / Б. Ю. Иванов, А. А. Комзолова, И. С. Ряховская. — Москва: РОССПЭН, 2008. — P. 371—372. — 735 p. — ISBN 978-5-8243-1031-3.
- Меөодіевъ (in Russian) // Члены Государственной думы (портреты и биографии): Четвертый созыв, 1912—1917 г. / сост. М. М. Боиович. — Москва: Тип. Т-ва И. Д. Сытина, 1913. — P. 1. — LXIV, 454, [2] p.
- Овсянкин Е. И. Мефодиев Николай Владимирович (in Russian) // Поморская энциклопедия: в 5 т. / Адм. Арханг. обл. [и др.]. — Архангельск, 2001. — Vol. 1 : История Архангельского Севера. — P. 245 — 483 p. — ISBN 5-88086-147-3.
