= Kalvträskskidan =

One of the oldest skis ever found

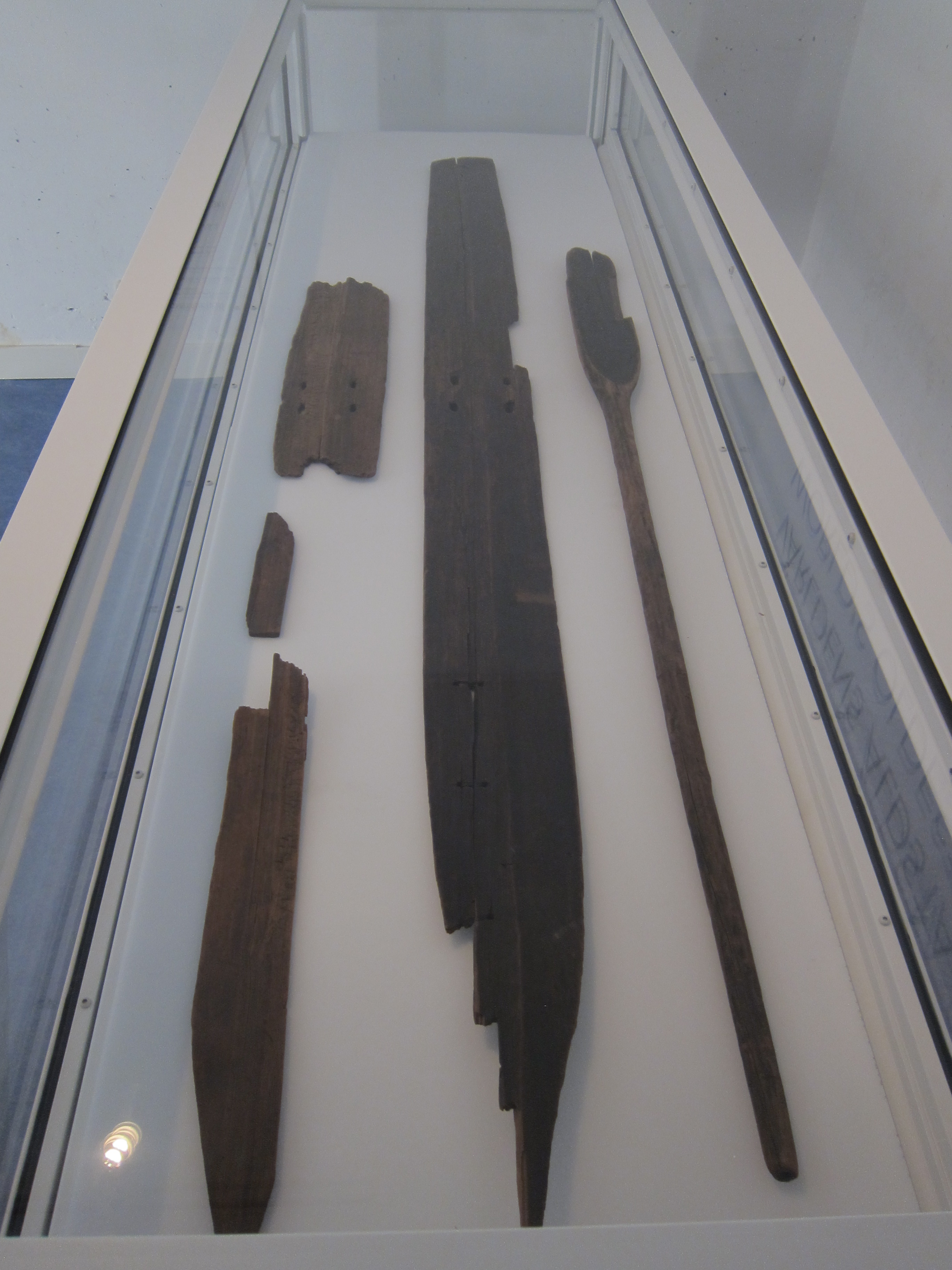
Kalvträskskidan at the ski museum in Umeå.

Kalvträskskidan ("the Kalvträsk ski") is among the oldest skis ever found. The ski was found in a mire near Kalvträsk in northern Sweden. Carbon dating has shown that the ski is about 5200 years old.

== Discovery ==
The Kalvträsk ski was found in the autumn of 1924, as a group of men digging a ditch through a mire near the village of Kalvträsk close to Skellefteå, Sweden encountered some wooden objects at a depth of 1.5 metres. They carefully extracted the objects that turned out to be two skis measuring 204 cm by 15.5 cm and a shovel-shaped ski pole measuring 156 cm. The objects were kept in a shed that winter before being turned into a museum the following summer. By that time, one of the skis had started to wither and fall apart, so that only a few fragments of it remain. Thankfully, the other ski is still more or less intact.

== Analysis ==
An original dating using pollen analysis of pollen from the site suggested that the skis were 4000 years old, but later carbon dating has shown evidence that they are around 5200 years old, i.e. older than the pyramids of ancient Egypt. An analysis made in 1992 by the Forest Sciences faculty of the Swedish University of Agricultural Sciences showed that the skis were made from pine that had grown in a slope, causing the wood to become denser than ordinary. This shows good craftmansship, since this type of wood has been favoured by ski makers in more recent times as well. Each ski had four holes for the bindings, which corresponds well with ancient skis found in Siberia, but not typical of other skis found in Scandinavia. The ski pole is similar to ski poles used in historic times by the Sami people in northern Scandinavia.

The ski is exhibited in the Västerbottens Museum in Umeå.
