= Belomorsk =

Town in the Republic of Karelia, Russia

Belomorsk Беломорск Šuomua (Karelian)
- Town
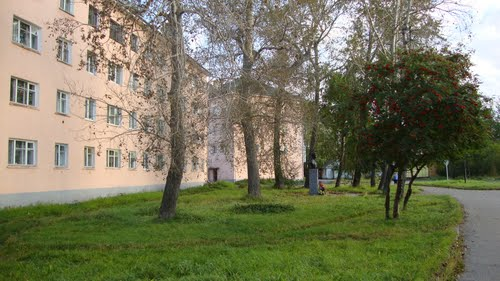
- Pashkova Street in Belomorsk

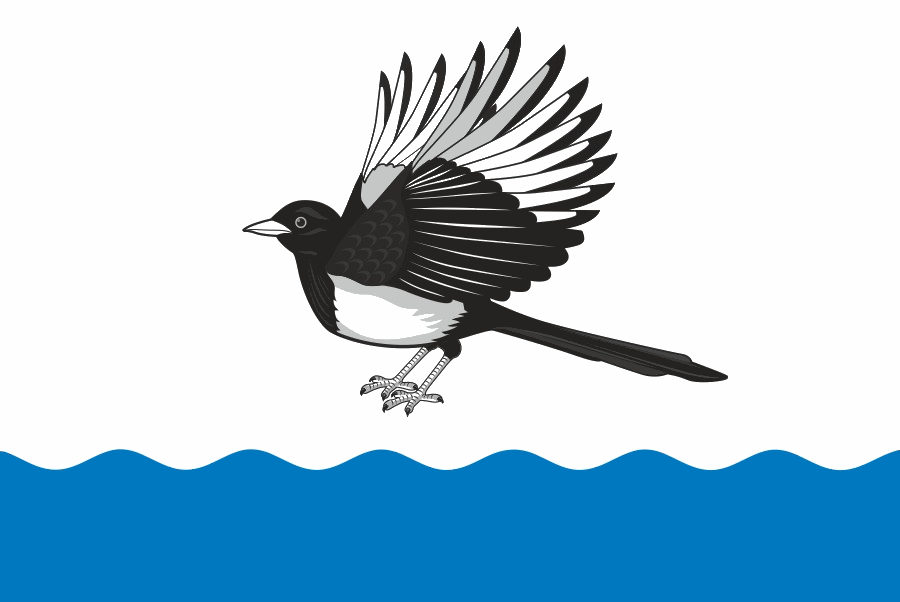
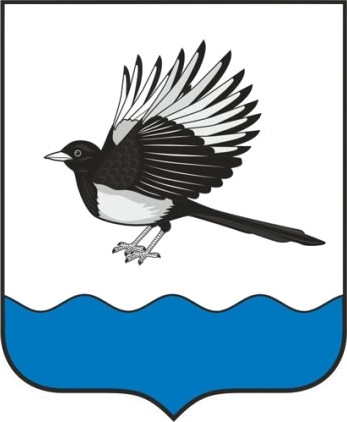
- Flag Coat of arms
- Interactive map of Belomorsk
- Location of Belomorsk Belomorsk (Karelia)
- Coordinates: 64°31′31″N 34°45′57″E
- Country: Russia
- Federal subject: Republic of Karelia
- Administrative district: Belomorsky District
- Founded: September 11, 1938
- Town status since: September 11, 1938
- Elevation: 10 m (33 ft)

Population (2010 Census)
  - Total: 11,217
  - Estimate (2023): 7,407 (−34%)

Administrative status
  - Capital of: Belomorsky District

Municipal status
  - Municipal district: Belomorsky Municipal District
  - Urban settlement: Belomorskoye Urban Settlement
  - Capital of: Belomorsky Municipal District, Belomorskoye Urban Settlement
- Time zone: UTC+3 (UTC+03:00)
- Postal code: 186500
- Dialing code: +7 81437
- OKTMO ID: 86604101001

Belomorsk (Russian: Беломо́рск; Karelian: Šuomua; formerly Finnish: Sorokka) is a town and the administrative center of Belomorsky District in the Republic of Karelia, Russia, located on the Onega Bay on the shore of the White Sea. Population: 11,217 (2010 census); 13,103 (2002 census); 18,935 (1989 Soviet census).

== History ==
In the beginning it was a small village named Soroka (Соро́ка), or Sorotskaya (Сороцкая) in the official Russian Imperial statistics. On September 11, 1938, Soroka and several nearby localities were merged to form the town of Belomorsk. In 1941–1944, during World War II, it served as the temporary capital of the Karelo-Finnish Soviet Socialist Republic.

== Administrative and municipal status ==
Within the framework of administrative divisions, Belomorsk serves as the administrative center of Belomorsky District, to which it is directly subordinated. As a municipal division, the town of Belomorsk, together with eleven rural localities, is incorporated within Belomorsky Municipal District as Belomorskoye Urban Settlement.

== Culture ==
Belomorsk is the cultural center of Pomorye. Historical places nearby include Zalavruga and Besovy Sledki with ancient petroglyphs.

== Transportation ==
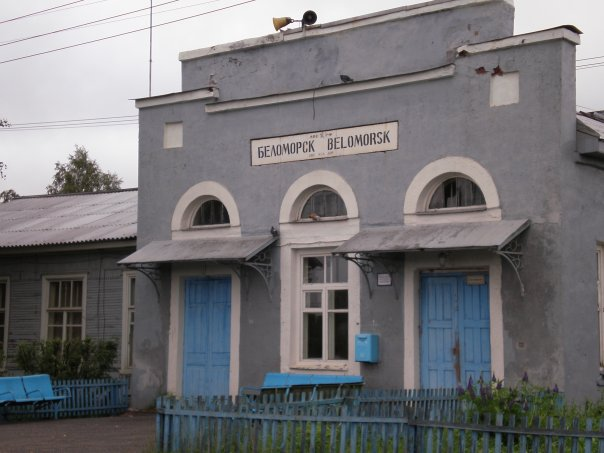
Belomorsk railway station

Belomorsk is situated on the mouth of the White Sea – Baltic Canal. The town can be said to be situated at the entrance to the canal, the end point of the waterway system being in St. Petersburg. The Kirov Railway connects Belomorsk with Murmansk and St. Petersburg. A new port is being constructed in Belomorsk that will have a capacity of nine million tons of cargo by 2014. In a second stage the capacity can be increased to fifteen million tons. The port will not be ice-free year around, but will nevertheless operate without interruption by using icebreakers during winter.
