= Petroglyphs of Lake Onega and the White Sea =

UNESCO World Heritage Site
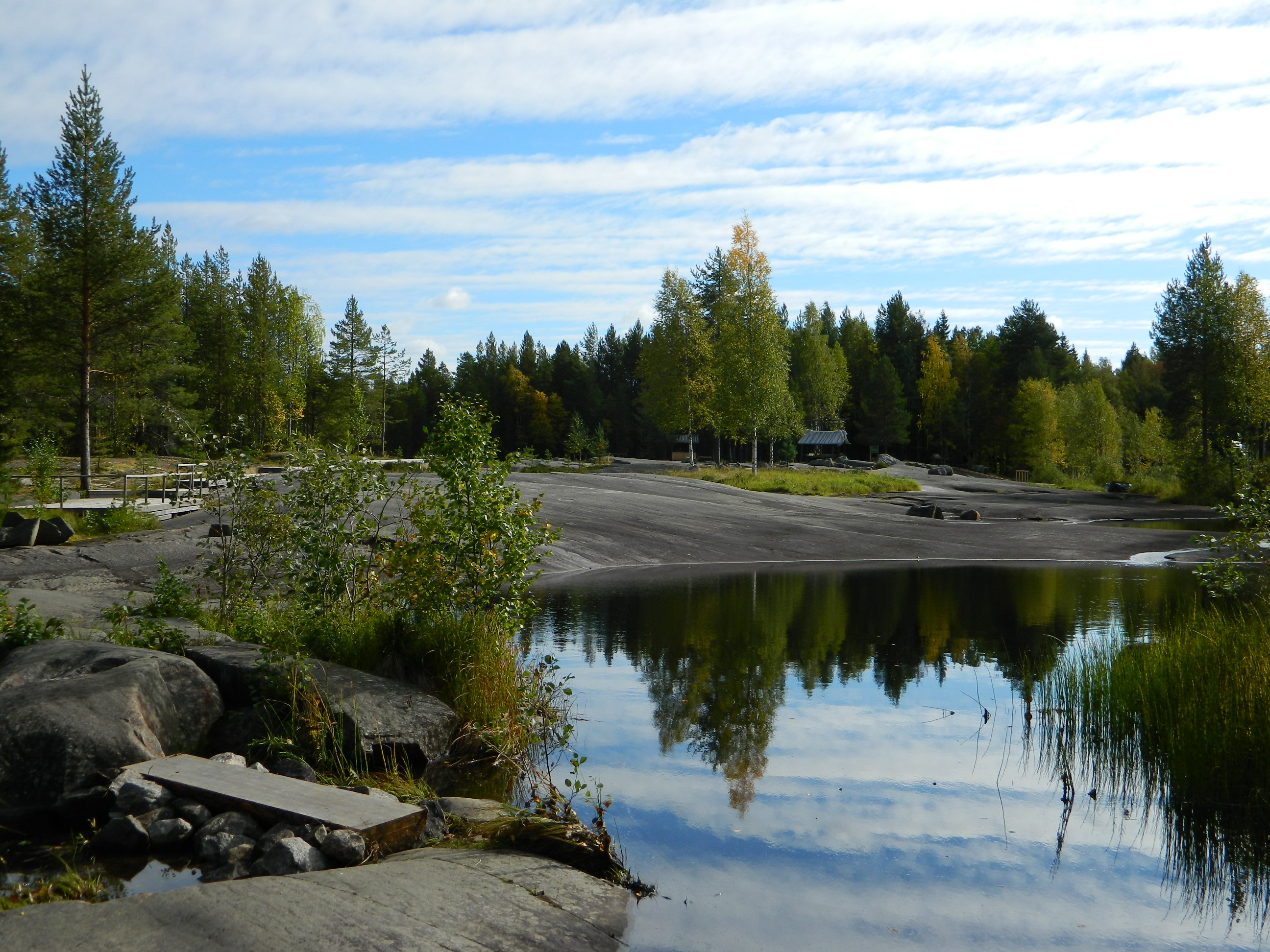
- Interactive map of Petroglyphs of Lake Onega and the White Sea
- Location: Russia
- Criteria: Cultural: (iii)
- Reference: 1654
- Inscription: 2021 (44th Session)

Petroglyphs of Lake Onega and the White Sea is a UNESCO World Heritage Site in Russia, Republic of Karelia, listed on 28 July 2021. The World Heritage Site comprises 33 petroglyph sites in two clusters. The rock carvings were created from 7 to 4 millennia ago and represent a glimpse into the lives of Neolithic cultures of Fennoscandia.

== Petroglyphs ==
The Lake Onega cluster, Pudozhsky District, has 22 petroglyph sites with over 1,200 figures. They mostly depict birds, animals, half-human and half-animal figures, and geometric shapes possibly representing the Moon and the Sun. One of the better known sites is on the cape Besov Nos.

The cluster at the White Sea (Belomorsky District) has 11 sites with over 3,400 figures. According to the Permanent Delegation of the Russian Federation to UNESCO, they are clearly aligned towards hunting and often depict the hunter himself. They also show sailing boat scenes, hunting and labour equipment, and animal and human footprints.

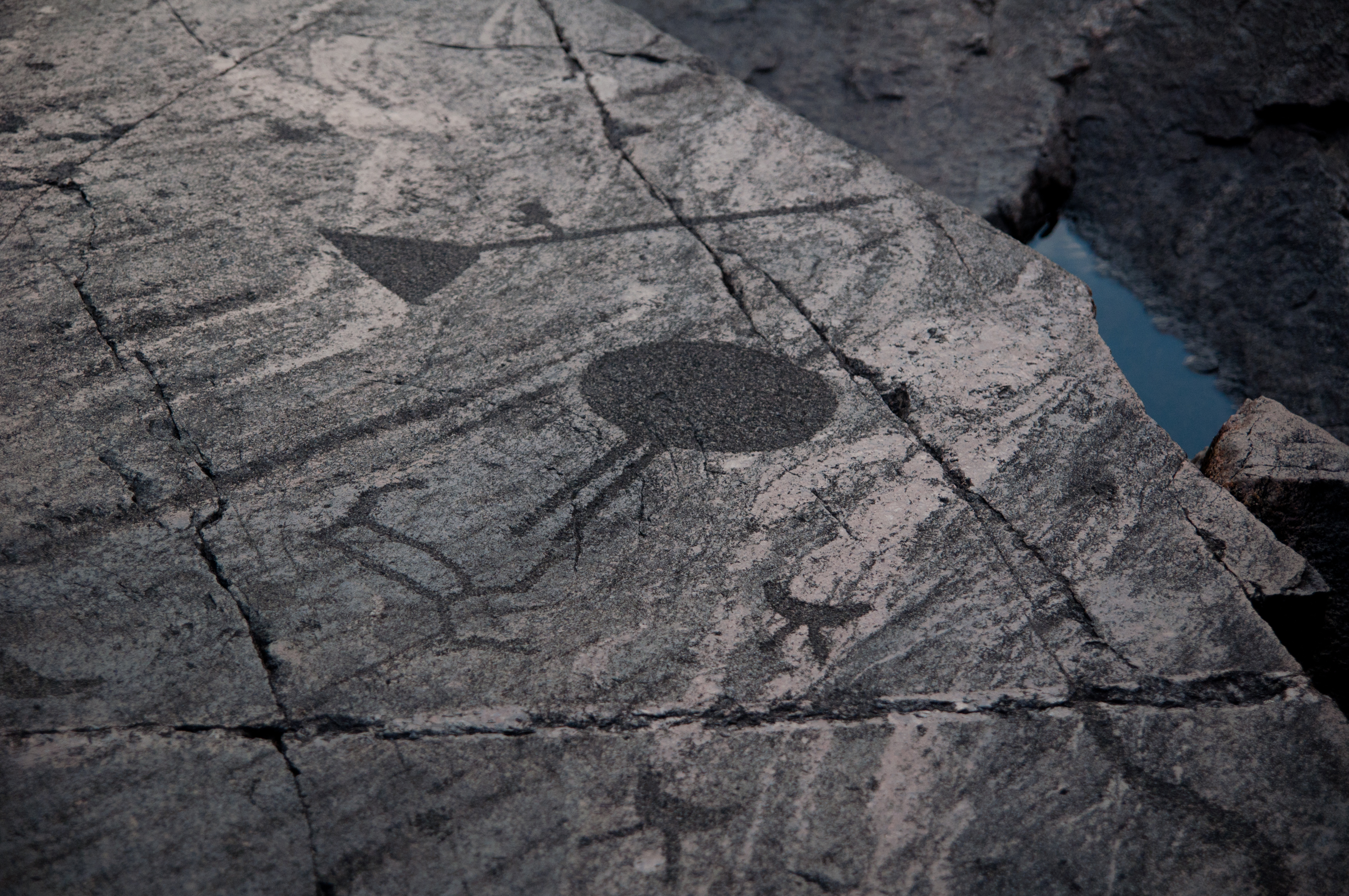
Petroglyphs on the shore of Lake Onega

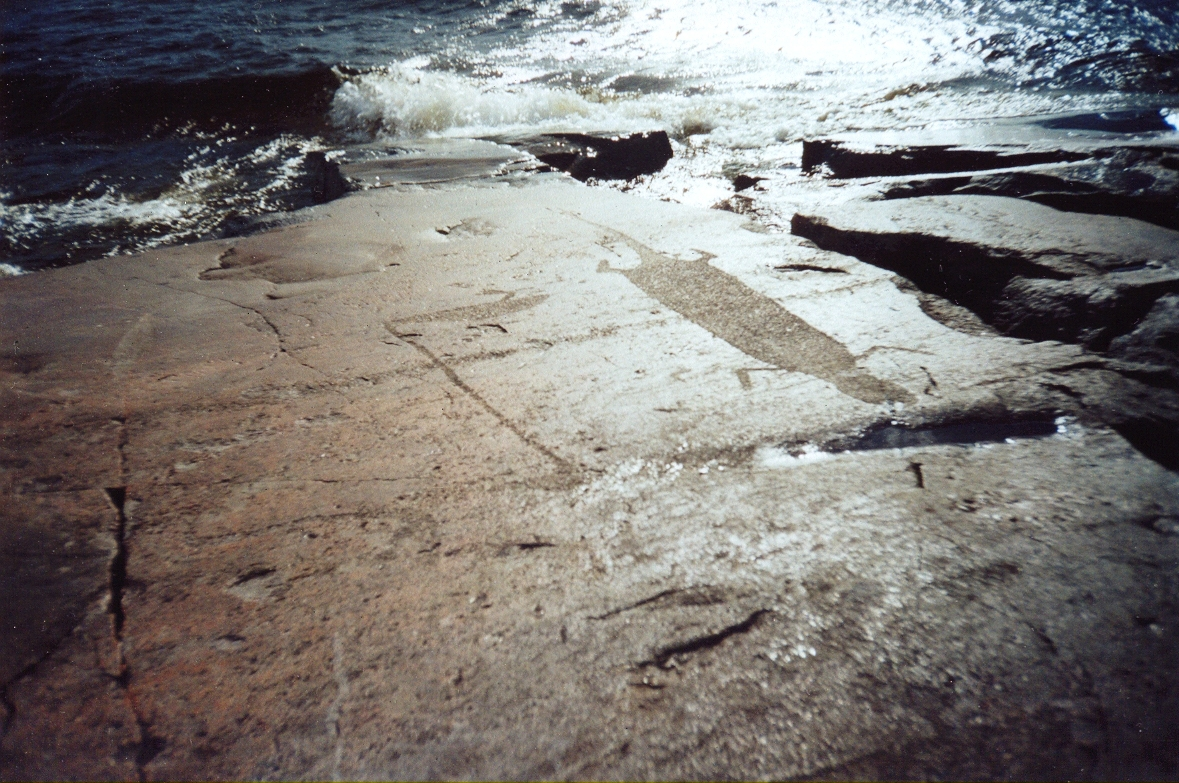
A rock carving depicting an otter or a lizard

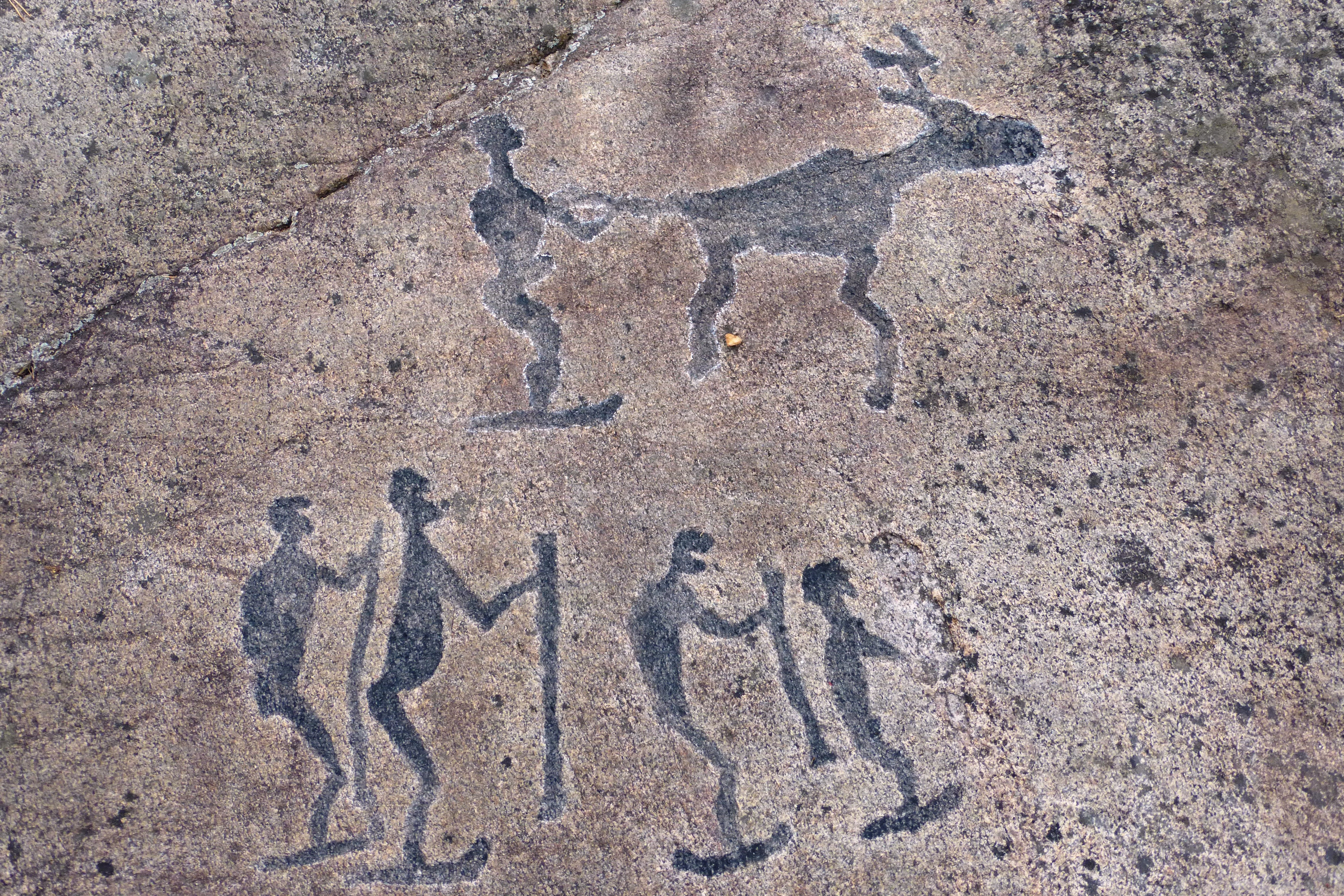
A petroglyph depicting 5 skiers and a reindeer

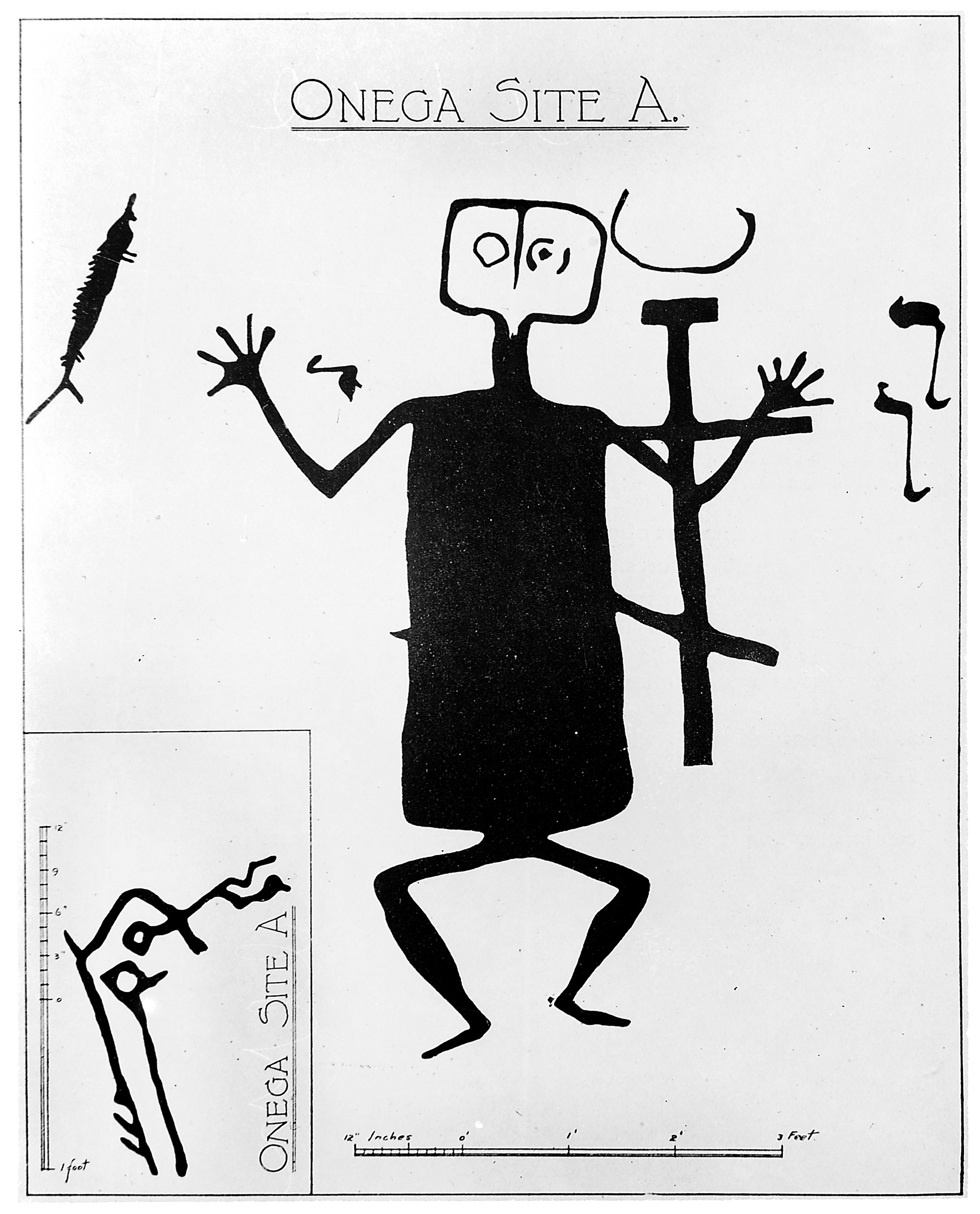
A depiction of a human figure
