= Belomorsky District =

Belomorsky District Беломорский район (Russian)
- District

Other transcription(s)
  - Karelian: Belomorskin piiri
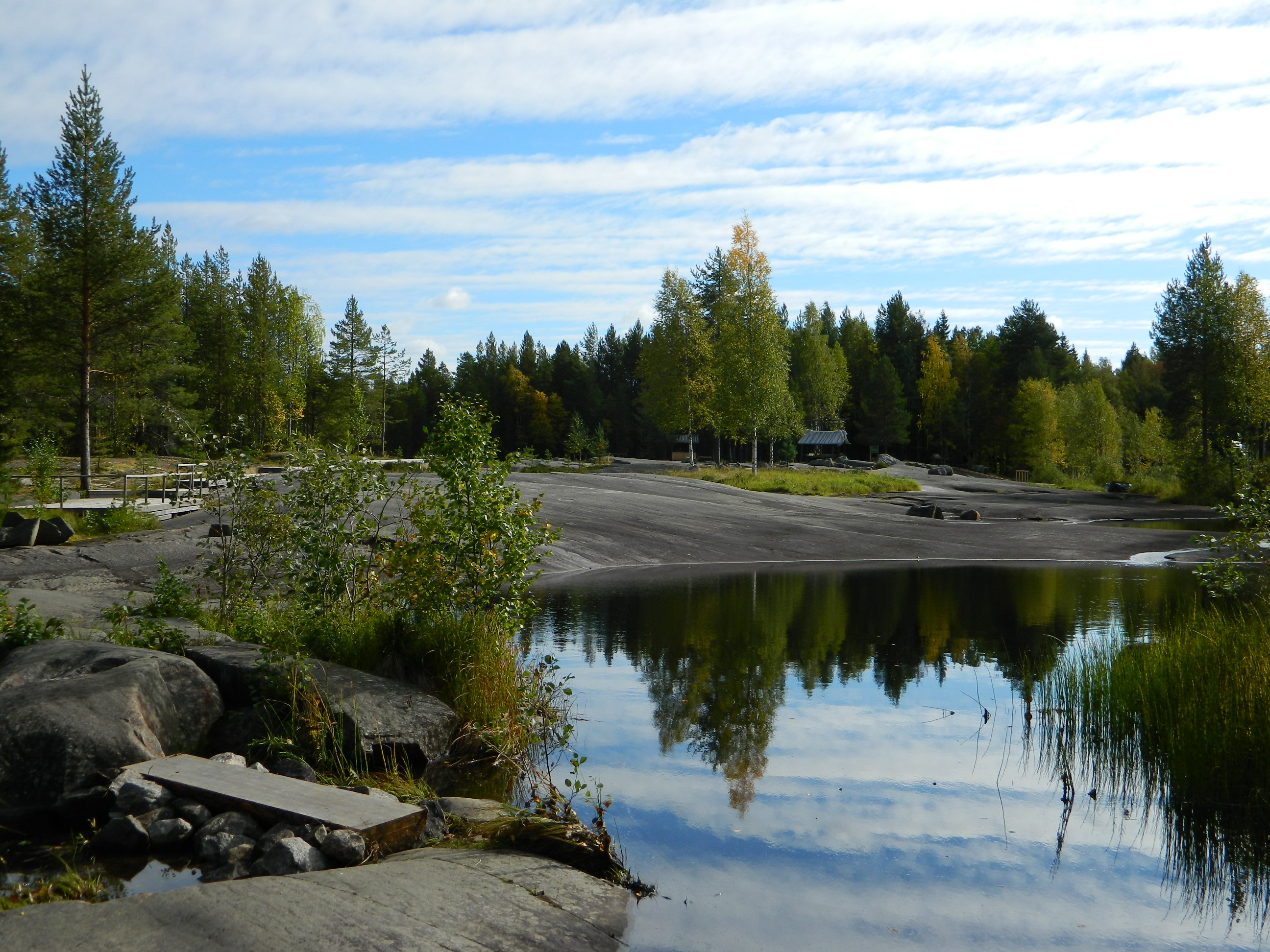
- The Petroglyphs of Lake Onega and the White Sea, a World Heritage Site

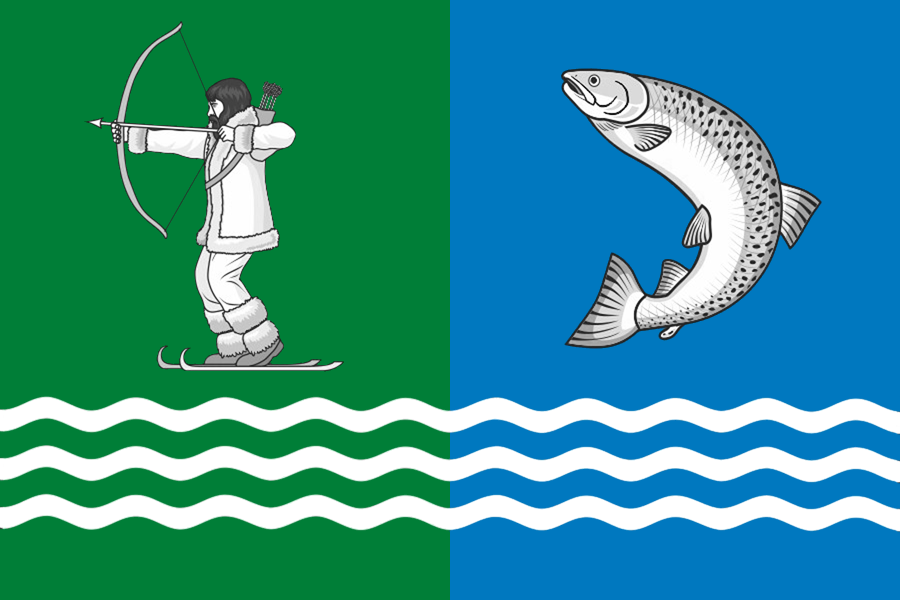
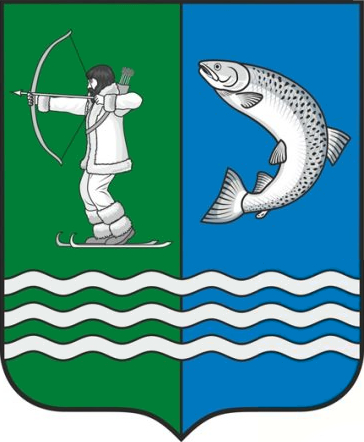
- Flag Coat of arms
- Location of Belomorsky District in the Republic of Karelia
- Coordinates: 64°31′N 34°46′E
- Country: Russia
- Federal subject: Republic of Karelia
- Established: 1927
- Administrative center: Belomorsk

Area
  - Total: 13,000 km^{2} (5,000 sq mi)

Population (2010 Census)
  - Total: 19,118
  - Density: 1.5/km^{2} (3.8/sq mi)
  - Urban: 58.7%
  - Rural: 41.3%

Administrative structure
  - Inhabited localities: 1 cities/towns, 56 rural localities

Municipal structure
  - Municipally incorporated as: Belomorsky Municipal District
  - Municipal divisions: 1 urban settlements, 3 rural settlements
- Time zone: UTC+3 (UTC+03:00)
- OKTMO ID: 86604000
- Website: http://belomorsk-mo.ru

Population of Belomorsky District
- 2010 Census: 19,118
- 2002 Census: 24,003
- 1989 Census: 31,381
- 1979 Census: 34,057

Belomorsky District (Russian: Беломо́рский райо́н; Karelian: Belomorskin piiri) is an administrative district (raion), one of the fifteen in the Republic of Karelia, Russia. It is located in the east of the republic. The area of the district is 13,000 square kilometers (5,000 sq mi). Its administrative center is the town of Belomorsk. As of the 2010 Census, the total population of the district was 19,118, with the population of Belomorsk accounting for 58.7% of that number.

== Administrative and municipal status ==
Within the framework of administrative divisions, Belomorsky District is one of the fifteen in the Republic of Karelia and has administrative jurisdiction over one town (Belomorsk) and fifty-six rural localities. As a municipal division, the district is incorporated as Belomorsky Municipal District. The town of Belomorsk and eleven rural localities are incorporated into an urban settlement, while the remaining forty-five rural localities are incorporated into three rural settlements within the municipal district. The town of Belomorsk serves as the administrative center of both the administrative and municipal district.
