= Kronoskogens naturreservat =

Kronoskogens Naturskyddsområde
- Kronoskogen's Nature Preserve
- Location within Southern Sweden
- Location: Ljungby, Sweden
- Coordinates: 56°50′45″N 13°57′29″E
- Area: 55.5 hectares (137 acres)
- Established: October 26, 2016

Kronoskogens naturreservat (English: Kronoskogen's nature preserve), formerly only Kronoskogen, is a nature preserve inside Ljungby urban area. The area is considered to have high a natural value through its landscape, geological and biological values as well as the importance for the local outdoor life. The reserve is 55.5 hectares (about 137 acres) large which of 49 hectare (about 121 acres) is forest. The forest consists largely of pine trees (about 85%), but there is also spruce (3%) and deciduous-mixed coniferous forest (3%).

The oldest description of the area is found on a map from 1813 where the area is described as "unfit drift sand". The oldest pine trees in the area is 150 years old and was planted around this time, probably to bind the drift sand and prevent its spread.

Kronoskogen's nature preserve is a popular recreational area with volleyball and soccer fields, outside gym, and three electric light trails of 1 kilometers, 2.3 kilometers, and 3 kilometers.

The proposal to convert Kronoskogen into a nature preserve came from the centrist Marianne Eckerbom year 2011. The idea was not only to safeguard the natural value of the area but also to protect it from inherited possible future risks, such as building purposes, as the area lies on coveted municipal ground. While the protection took effect October 26 2016, the preserve's inauguration ceremony was delayed until September 30 2017. During the ceremony speeches was hold by the then municipal commissioner Magnus Gunnarsson and the Environment and Building Board's chairman Kent Danielsson.
