= Ski for Light =

Non-profit organization

Ski for Light, Inc.
- Motto: If I can do this, I can do anything!
- Purpose: Cross-country skiing for visually impaired and mobility-impaired people
- Frequency: Every year
- Inaugurated: 1975
- Headquarters: Minneapolis, Minnesota, USA
- Website: Ski for Light Homepage

Ski for Light, Inc. is a non-profit organization founded in 1975 that provides opportunities for visually impaired and mobility-impaired people to experience cross-country skiing. It hosts an annual week-long event at various U.S. locations.

== Cross-country ski program for visually impaired and mobility-impaired people ==
Ski for Light provides cross-country skiing programs for visually impaired and mobility-impaired adults, pairing each visually impaired person with an experienced, sighted cross-country skier, who serves both as instructor and guide. The organization holds an annual week-long event for upwards of 200 participants and guides at different venues in the United States. Disabled skiers and their assigned guides ski together in parallel sets of tracks, thus facilitating the ability of the guides to inform skiers about the terrain ahead. The skill levels of participants with impairments span from novice to expert skier. The annual event includes both touring and racing using the classic (in track) technique only. It has been held in twelve different U.S. states since 1975. Participants have come from throughout the U.S. and at least twelve other countries. The level of skiing proficiency that impaired participants can achieve reportedly inspires the organization's motto, "If I can do this, I can do anything!" Guides often derive sufficient reward from their participation to return regularly to the organization's annual events and to participate in regional events, as well.

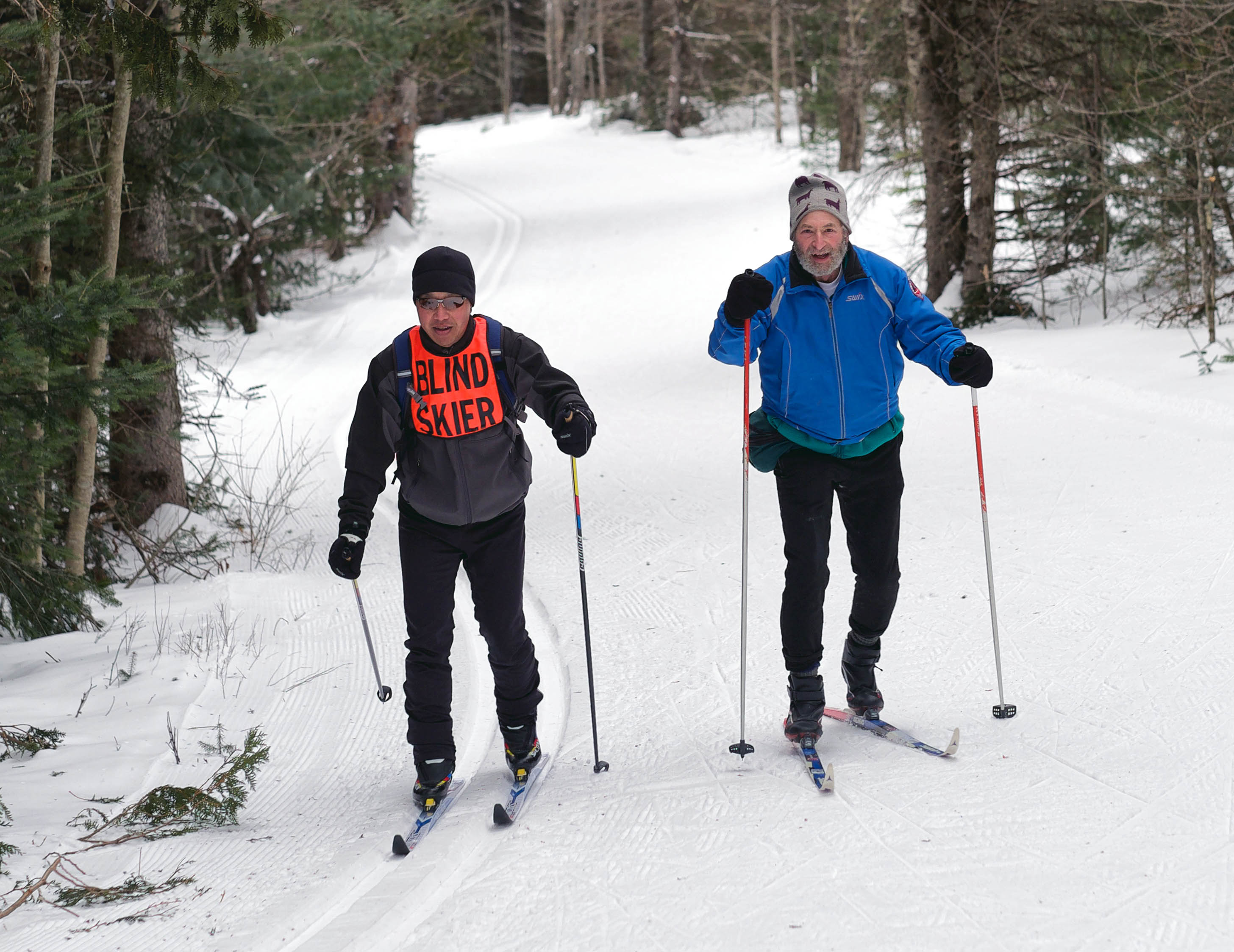
Blind skier and guide

== Origin and history ==
The idea of teaching blind people to cross-country ski began with Erling Stordahl, a blind Norwegian musician, whose efforts led to the creation in 1964 of the Ridderrennet, or "Knights race". Held in Beitostolen, Norway, the Ridderrennet hosts more than 1,000 disabled participants and guides from around the world. The idea for Ski for Light, patterned after the Ridderrennet, was brought to the United States in 1975 by Olav Pedersen, who was a ski instructor at the Breckenridge Ski Resort, and by Bjarne Eikevik, the International President of the Sons of Norway.

== Organization and governance ==
Ski for Light is an all-volunteer organization, guided by a board of directors drawn from the community of disabled skiers and guides who attend the annual event. Its income comes primarily from fees paid by event participants, supplemented by an endowment and fund raising. There are nine independent, affiliated organizations across the United States, which share the name, "Ski for Light". They hold smaller events for disabled skiers in California, Colorado, Michigan, Montana, New England, Pennsylvania, South Dakota, Washington, and Wisconsin.

== See also ==
- Cross-country skiing
- Paralympic cross-country skiing
