= Hosjö Church =

Church in Falun, Sweden

Coordinates: 60.5922°N 15.7608°E

Hosjö Church (Swedish: Hosjö kyrka) is a congregational church for the Hosjö Congregation, in Falun, Sweden.

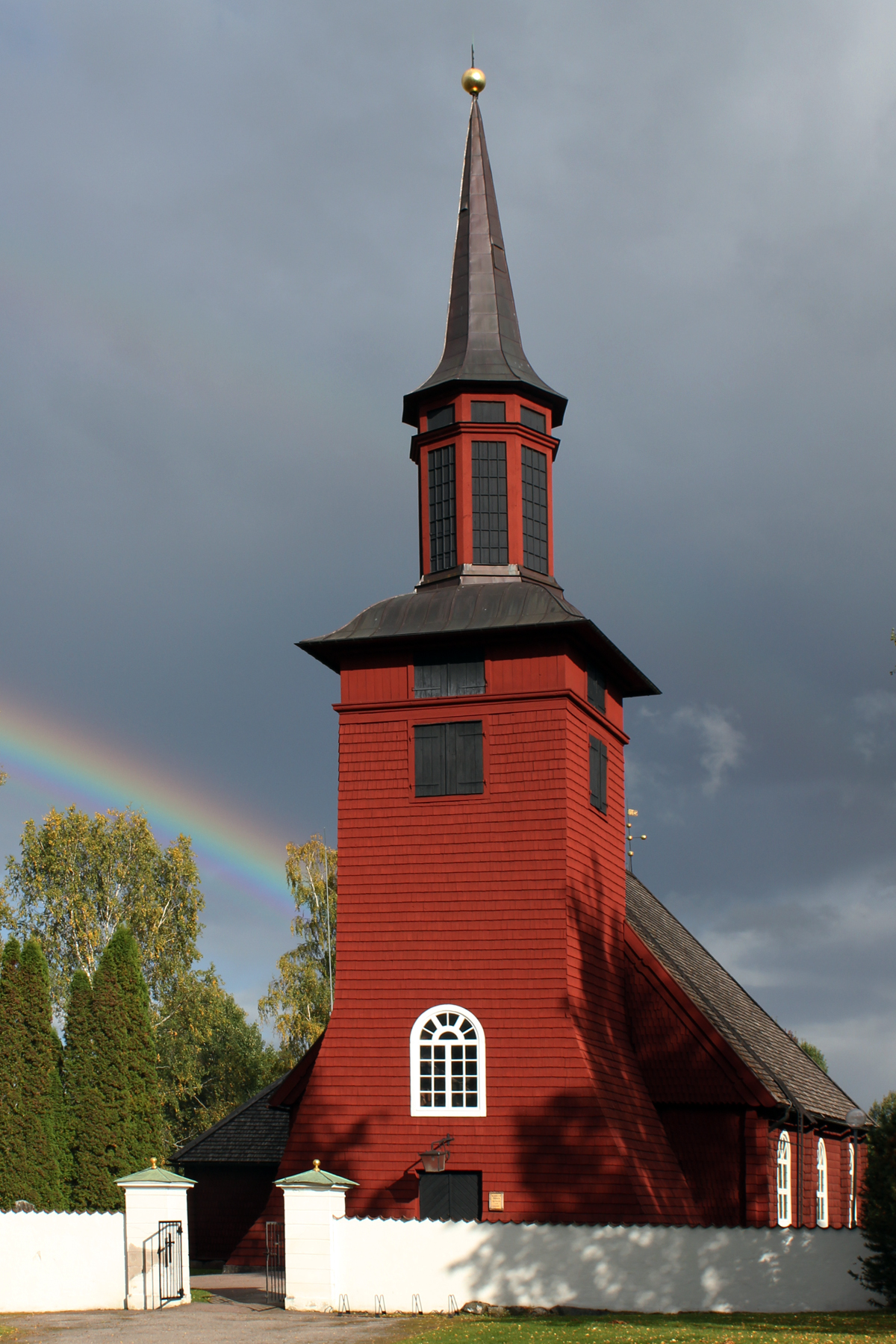
Hosjö Church

== The building ==
Hosjö Church was built in 1663 and consists of a small red wooden building with a tower. Its initial status was a chapel belonging to Vika Church, which was the main church in Vika parish. The chapel became a church in the 1970s. The church is surrounded by a cemetery and a few hundred metres away there is another cemetery and a memorial. In the church's proximity, there is also a rectory, a parish hall, and a number of old pines which are recognised as natural heritage.

The tower originally had a spire on a low onion dome, but at a renovation in 1880 the tower got its current design. In the tower, there are two bells, one major from 1683 and a minor from the 1669.

== See also ==
- Falun
- Hosjö, Falun
