= Hosjö, Falun =

Coordinates: 60°35′30″N 15°44′53″E

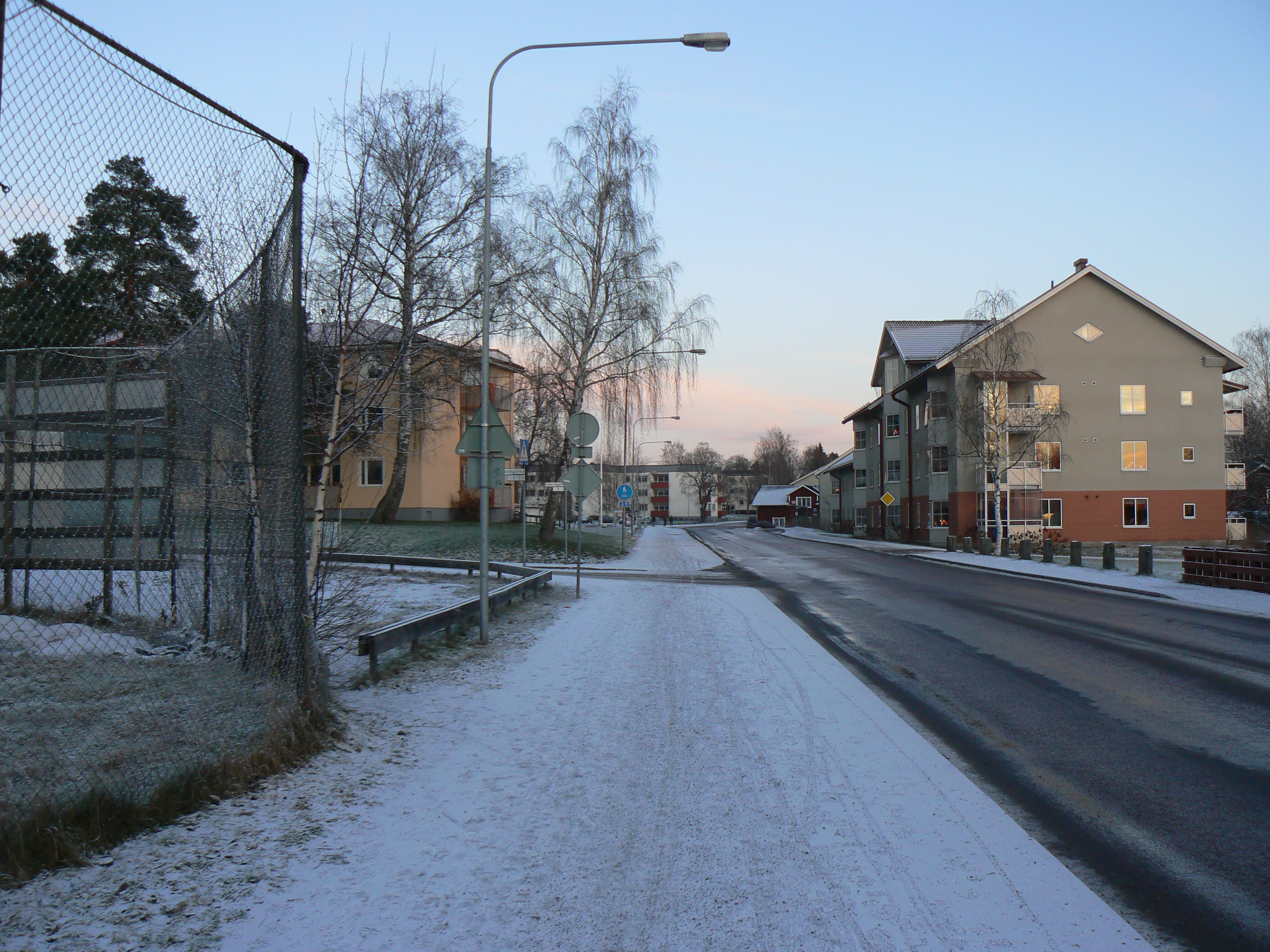
Centralvägen in Hosjö

Hosjö (Swedish pronunciation: [ˈhǔːɧœ]) is a suburb and parish in Falun, Sweden. Hosjö forms the most eastern part of the city and consists mostly of houses, with some apartments.

In Hosjö, there is a grocery store, news agency, school, preschools, petrol station, pizzeria, some sporting facilities and industries (2005). The parish has previously broken away from the old Vika Parish and houses roughly 3000 residents (2005). Hosjö Church (previously, Hosjö Chapel) is a Falu red, wooden church that was completed in 1663, thanks to voluntary work and donations from residents in Hosjö. Hosjö is primarily a place where people live, so travel to other Falu suburbs and central Falun is common. The suburb is positioned between two lakes, Hosjön and Runn, and can also be subdivided into different areas, such as Hosjöstrand, Backberget, Central Hosjö, Uddnas, Karlslund, Skutudden, and Hosjöholmen.

== School ==
Hosjö School (Swedish: Hosjöskolan) is a municipal lower and middle elementary school (grades 1–6). The youth of the suburb attend the upper elementary school (grades 7–9) at Hälsinggården School (Swedish: Hälsinggårdsskolan) in Hälsinggården.

== Etymology ==
Ho, in the name Hosjö, is Swedish for sink or trough. The word sjö simply means lake in Swedish.
