= Floodlit trail =

Electrically illuminated trail

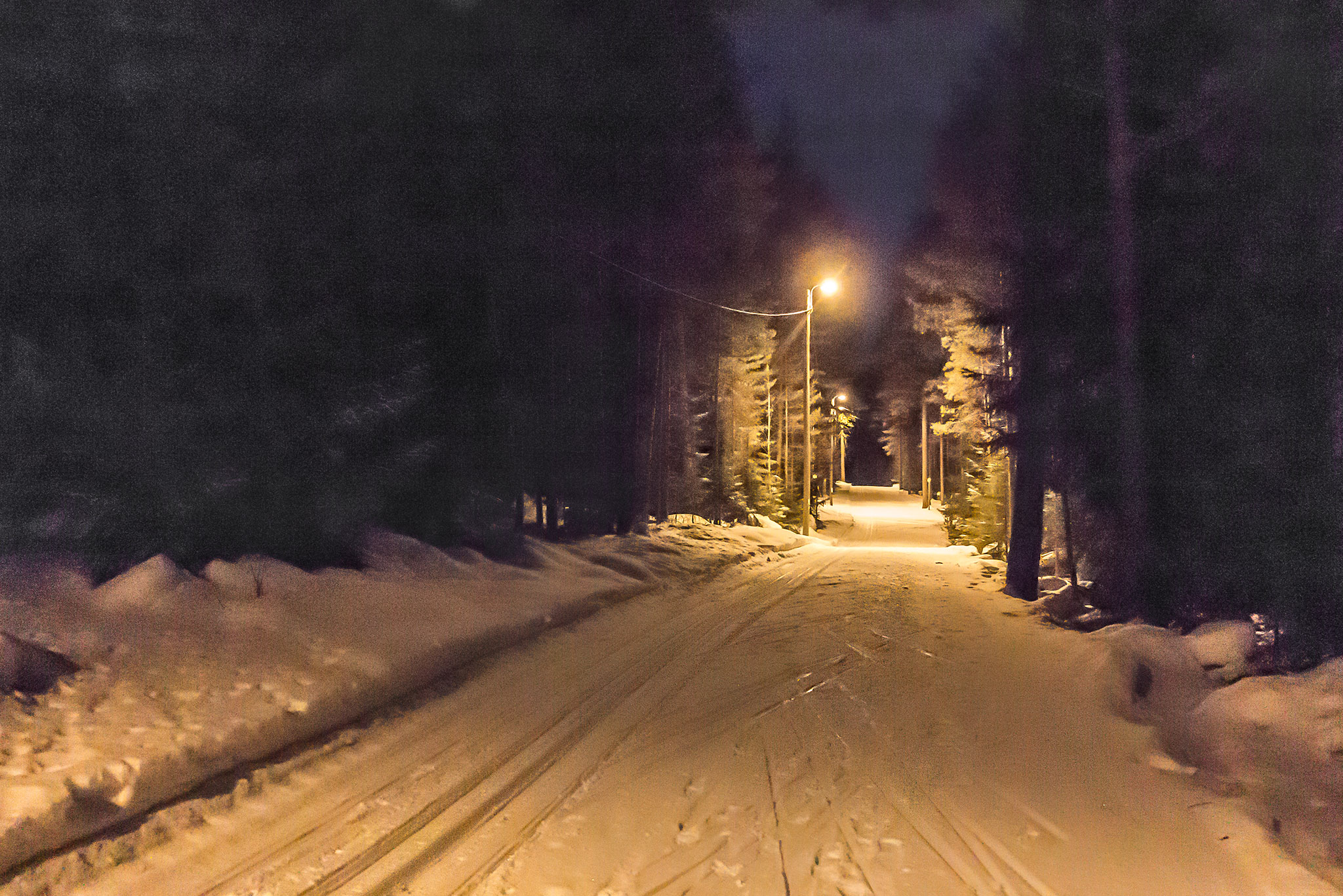
A floodlit trail in winter, Finland

A floodlit trail (Norwegian: Lysløype; Swedish: Elljusspår) is an electrically illuminated trail, often completely or partly in a forest.

== Trails ==
Floodlit trails are used for jogging or walking, even during hours of darkness. They often take the form of landscaped trails with gravel or woodchips as a surface layer. When snow-covered, snowshoe and skiing trails may be groomed. While groomed, pedestrian use may be restricted.

== Norway ==
An illuminated track in Oslo, Norway was opened in 1946.

== Sweden ==
Most of the floodlit trails were constructed during the 1970s. As of 2019, there are about 1700 illuminated trails in Sweden. A common length of an electric light trail in Sweden is about 2 to 2.5 kilometres (1.2 to 1.6 mi).

== Gallery ==
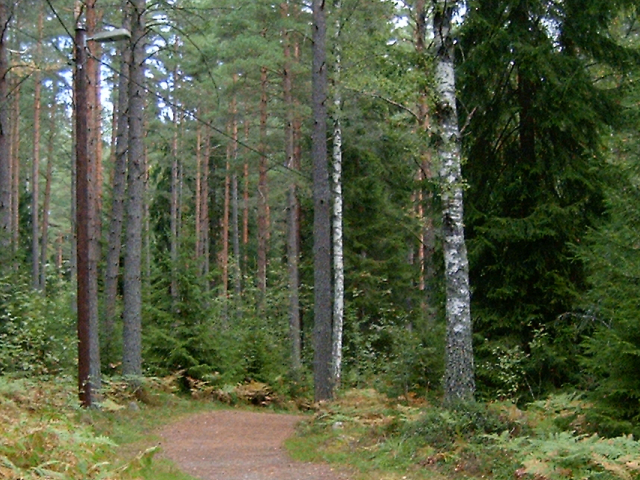
A floodlit trail outside Hökåsen in Västerås, Sweden, with a typical light fixture for such trails.

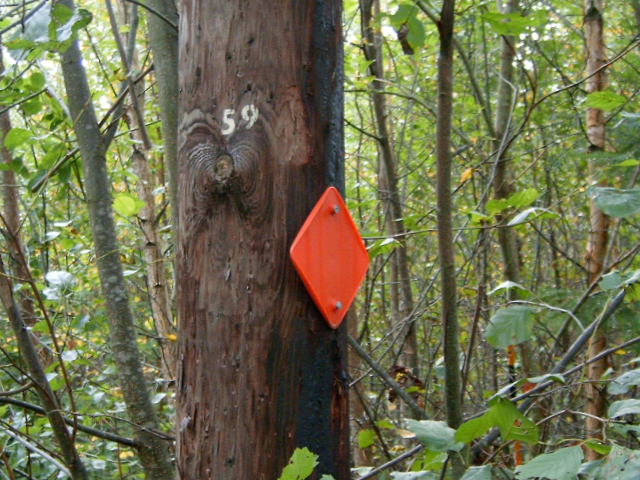
Floodlit trails often have way markings to ease navigation.

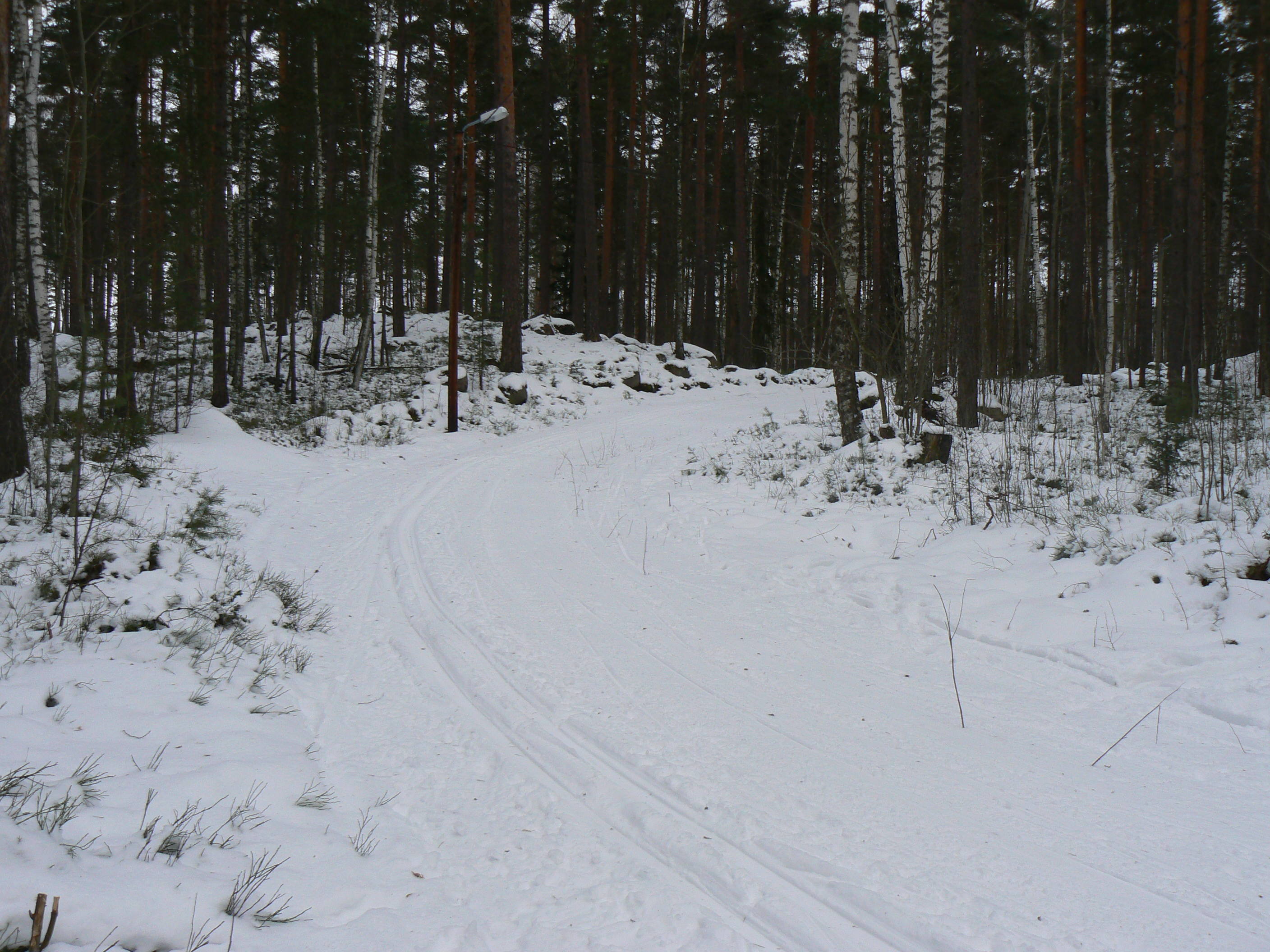
A groomed floodlit trail outside Hosjö in Falun, Sweden.
